= List of Max Planck Institutes =

Max Planck Institutes are research institutions operated by the Max Planck Society. There are over 80 institutes. Most of them are located in Germany, although there are other locations in other European countries and the United States.

Institutes are organized into five categories according to their research area:

- Astronomy & Astrophysics
- Biology & Medicine
- Material & Technology
- Environment & Climate
- Humanities

One institute can belong to several research areas. In addition, it can also belong to several more specialized research fields. In administrative terms, the institutes of the Max Planck Society are divided into three sections: Biology and Medicine, Chemistry, Physics and Technology and Human Sciences.

== Institutes and Research Units ==
As of April 2024, the following Max Planck Institutes and Research Units exist (in alphabetical order):

| Name | Location | Research areas |
|---|---|---|
| Max Planck Institute for Empirical Aesthetics | Frankfurt | cultural studies, social science, cognitive science, linguistics |
| Max Planck Institute of Animal Behavior | Radolfzell / Konstanz | evolutionary biology, ethology, ecology |
| Max Planck Institute for Evolutionary Anthropology | Leipzig | Evolutionary anthropology, developmental biology, evolutionary biology, genetics and ancient DNA, behavioral ecology, primatology, cultural evolution, linguistics, and cognitive science |
| Max Planck Institute for Social Anthropology | Halle | cultural studies, jurisprudence, social and behavioural sciences |
| Max Planck Institute for Astronomy | Heidelberg | astronomy, astrophysics |
| Max Planck Institute for Astrophysics | Garching | astronomy, astrophysics |
| Bibliotheca Hertziana – Max Planck Institute for Art History | Rome (Italy) | cultural studies |
| Max Planck Institute of Biochemistry | Martinsried | developmental biology, evolutionary biology, genetics, immunology, infection biology, medicine, structural biology, cell biology |
| Max Planck Institute for Biogeochemistry | Jena | microbiology, ecology, earth science, climatology |
| Max Planck Institute for Biological Intelligence | Martinsried / Seewiesen | organismic biology, ornithology, neurobiology, behavioural ecology, evolutionary biology, evolutionary genetics, neuroscience |
| Max Planck Institute for Biology of Ageing | Cologne | developmental biology, evolutionary biology, genetics, structural biology, cell biology |
| Max Planck Institute for Molecular Biomedicine | Münster | developmental biology, evolutionary biology, genetics, immunology, infection biology, medicine, structural biology, cell biology |
| Max Planck Institute for Biology Tübingen | Tübingen | developmental biology, evolutionary biology, genetics, botany, structural biology, cell biology |
| Max Planck Institute of Biophysics | Frankfurt | developmental biology, evolutionary biology, genetics, structural biology, cell biology |
| Max Planck Institute for Brain Research | Frankfurt | neuroscience |
| Max Planck Institute of Molecular Cell Biology and Genetics | Dresden | developmental biology, evolutionary biology, genetics, neuroscience, structural biology, cell biology |
| Max Planck Institute for Chemistry | Mainz | chemistry, earth science, climatology |
| Max Planck Institute for Coal Research | Mülheim | chemistry, solid-state physics, materials science |
| Max Planck Institute for Human Cognitive and Brain Sciences | Leipzig | neuroscience, cognitive science, linguistics |
| Max Planck Institute for Research on Collective Goods | Bonn | jurisprudence, social and behavioural sciences |
| Max Planck Institute of Colloids and Interfaces | Golm | immunology, infection biology, medicine, structural biology, cell biology chemistry, solid-state physics, materials science |
| Max Planck Institute for the Study of Crime, Security and Law | Freiburg | jurisprudence, social and behavioural sciences |
| Max Planck Institute for Biological Cybernetics | Tübingen | neuroscience, cognitive science |
| Max Planck Institute for Demographic Research | Rostock | social and behavioural sciences |
| Max Planck Institute for the Study of Religious and Ethnic Diversity | Göttingen | cultural studies, social and behavioural sciences |
| Max Planck Institute for Dynamics of Complex Technical Systems | Magdeburg | structural biology, cell biology chemistry, complex systems |
| Max Planck Institute for Dynamics and Self-Organization | Göttingen | neuroscience, structural biology, cell biology solid-state physics, materials science, complex systems |
| Max Planck Institute for Chemical Ecology | Jena | developmental biology, evolutionary biology, genetics, microbiology, ecology, neuroscience, botany |
| Max Planck Institute for Chemical Energy Conversion | Mülheim | structural biology, cell biology chemistry |
| Ernst Strüngmann Institute for Neuroscience in Cooperation with Max Planck Society (associated institute) | Frankfurt | medicine, neuroscience |
| Max Planck Institute for Evolutionary Biology | Plön | developmental biology, evolutionary biology, genetics, behavioural biology |
| Max Planck Florida Institute for Neuroscience | Jupiter, Florida (United States) | neuroscience, structural biology, cell biology |
| Friedrich Miescher Laboratory of the Max Planck Society | Tübingen | developmental biology, evolutionary biology, structural biology, cell biology |
| Fritz Haber Institute of the Max Planck Society | Berlin | chemistry, solid-state physics, materials science, particle physics, plasma physics, quantum mechanics |
| Max Planck Institute for Molecular Genetics | Berlin | developmental biology, evolutionary biology, genetics, immunology, infection biology, medicine |
| Max Planck Institute of Geoanthropology | Jena | evolutionary biology, genetics, infection biology, social science, linguistics |
| Max Planck Institute for Gravitational Physics | Golm / Hanover | astronomy, astrophysics, particle physics, plasma physics, quantum mechanics |
| Max Planck Institute for Heart and Lung Research | Bad Nauheim | developmental biology, evolutionary biology, genetics, immunology, infection biology, medicine, physiology |
| Max Planck Institute for the History of Science | Berlin | cultural studies |
| Max Planck Institute for Human Development | Berlin | cultural studies, cognitive science, social and behavioural sciences |
| Max Planck Institute of Immunobiology and Epigenetics | Freiburg | developmental biology, evolutionary biology, genetics, immunology, infection biology, medicine |
| Max Planck Institute for Infection Biology | Berlin | immunology, infection biology, medicine |
| Max Planck Institute for Informatics | Saarbrücken | computer science |
| Max Planck Institute for Innovation and Competition | Munich | jurisprudence, social and behavioural sciences |
| Max Planck Institute for Intelligent Systems | Stuttgart / Tübingen | solid-state physics, materials science, structural biology, cell biology, computer science |
| Kunsthistorisches Institut in Florenz | Florence (Italy) | cultural studies |
| Max Planck Institute for Comparative and International Private Law | Hamburg | jurisprudence |
| Max Planck Institute for Comparative Public Law and International Law | Heidelberg | jurisprudence, social and behavioural sciences |
| Max Planck Institute for Social Law and Social Policy | Munich | jurisprudence, social and behavioural sciences |
| Max Planck Institute for Tax Law and Public Finance | Munich | jurisprudence |
| Max Planck Institute for Legal History and Legal Theory | Frankfurt | cultural studies, jurisprudence |
| Max Planck Institute for Mathematics | Bonn | mathematics |
| Max Planck Institute for Mathematics in the Sciences | Leipzig | mathematics |
| Max Planck Institute for Medical Research | Heidelberg | structural biology, cell biology |
| Max Planck Institute for Metabolism Research | Cologne | immunology, infection biology, medicine, neuroscience |
| Max Planck Institute for Meteorology | Hamburg | earth science, climatology |
| Max Planck Institute for Marine Microbiology | Bremen | microbiology, ecology, chemistry |
| Max Planck Institute for Terrestrial Microbiology | Marburg | developmental biology, evolutionary biology, genetics, microbiology, ecology, botany |
| Max Planck Institute of Microstructure Physics | Halle | solid-state physics, materials science, particle physics, plasma physics, quantum mechanics |
| Max Planck Institute for Multidisciplinary Sciences | Göttingen | neuroscience, medicine, chemistry, structural biology, genetics, evolutionary biology, developmental biology, cell biology, infection biology, immunology, particle physics, plasma physics, quantum mechanics |
| Max Planck Institute for Neurobiology of Behavior – caesar | Bonn | developmental biology, genetics, immunology, medicine, neuroscience, structural biology, cell biology |
| Max Planck Research Unit for Neurogenetics | Frankfurt | genetics, medicine, neuroscience, cell biology |
| Research Group Social Neuroscience | Berlin | neuroscience, social and behavioural sciences |
| Max Planck Unit for the Science of Pathogens | Berlin | genetics, immunology, infection biology, medicine, microbiology |
| Max Planck Institute for Nuclear Physics | Heidelberg | astronomy, astrophysics, particle physics, plasma physics, quantum mechanics |
| Max Planck Institute for Physics | Garching | astronomy, astrophysics, particle physics, plasma physics, quantum mechanics |
| Max Planck Institute for the Physics of Complex Systems | Dresden | solid-state physics, materials science, complex systems |
| Max Planck Institute for Chemical Physics of Solids | Dresden | chemistry, solid-state physics, materials science, particle physics, plasma physics, quantum mechanics |
| Max Planck Institute for Extraterrestrial Physics | Garching | astronomy, astrophysics, complex systems |
| Max Planck Institute for the Science of Light | Erlangen | solid-state physics, materials science, quantum mechanics, medicine, microbiology, cell biology |
| Max Planck Institute of Molecular Physiology | Dortmund | structural biology, cell biology physiology, chemistry |
| Max Planck Institute for Plant Breeding Research | Cologne | developmental biology, evolutionary biology, genetics, botany |
| Max Planck Institute of Molecular Plant Physiology | Golm | botany, structural biology, cell biology, physiology |
| Max Planck Institute for Plasma Physics | Garching / Greifswald | particle physics, plasma physics, quantum mechanics |
| Max Planck Institute for Polymer Research | Mainz | structural biology, cell biology chemistry, solid-state physics, materials science |
| Max Planck Institute of Psychiatry | Munich | developmental biology, evolutionary biology, genetics, immunology, infection biology, medicine, neuroscience, physiology, cognitive science, |
| Max Planck Institute for Psycholinguistics | Nijmegen (Netherlands) | cognitive science, linguistics |
| Max Planck Institute of Quantum Optics | Garching | particle physics, plasma physics, quantum mechanics |
| Max Planck Institute for Radio Astronomy | Bonn | astronomy, astrophysics |
| Max Planck Institute for Security and Privacy | Bochum | computer science |
| Max Planck Institute for the Study of Societies | Cologne | social and behavioural sciences |
| Max Planck Institute for Software Systems | Kaiserslautern / Saarbrücken | computer science |
| Max Planck Institute for Solar System Research | Göttingen | astronomy, astrophysics |
| Max Planck Institute for Solid State Research | Stuttgart | chemistry, solid-state physics, materials science, particle physics, plasma physics, quantum mechanics |
| Max Planck Institute for the Structure and Dynamics of Matter | Hamburg | solid-state physics, materials science |
| Max Planck Institute for Sustainable Materials | Düsseldorf | chemistry, solid-state physics, materials science |

=== Former ===
- Max Planck Institute for the Study of Living Conditions in the Scientific and Technical World (founded in 1970, renamed to Max Planck Institut for Social Sciences in 1980, closed in 1984)
- Max Planck Institute for Biophysical Chemistry (merged with the Max Planck Institute for Experimental Medicine to form the Max Planck Institute for Multidisciplinary Sciences, 1 January 2022)
- Max Planck Institute for Experimental Medicine (merged with the Max Planck Institute for Biophysical Chemistry to form the Max Planck Institute for Multidisciplinary Sciences, 1 January 2022)
- Max Planck Institute of Neurobiology (merged with the Max Planck Institute for Ornithology to form the Max Planck Institute for Biological Intelligence, 1 January 2023)
- Max Planck Institute for Ornithology (merged with the Max Planck Institute of Neurobiology to form the Max Planck Institute for Biological Intelligence, 1 January 2023)
- Max Planck Institute Luxembourg for International, European and Regulatory Procedural Law (transferred to the University of Luxembourg, 1 January 2024)

== See also ==
- List of institutes and centers of the National Institutes of Health
- Ernst Strüngmann Institute
- List of IBS Centers
