= Max Planck Institute for the Structure and Dynamics of Matter =

German research institute in Hamburg

- Max-Planck-Institut für Struktur und Dynamik der Materie
- Abbreviation: MPSD
- Formation: 1 January 2014; 12 years ago
- Type: Research institute
- Headquarters: Hamburg, Germany
- Location: Luruper Chaussee 149, Bahrenfeld, Hamburg
- Managing Director: Philip Moll
- Key people: Andrea Cavalleri (Condensed Matter Dynamics); Ángel Rubio (Theory); Philip Moll (Microstructured Quantum Matter); Jie Shan (Nanoscale Quantum Materials – Optics); Kin Fai Mak (Nanoscale Quantum Materials – Transport)
- Parent organization: Max Planck Society
- Website: www.mpsd.mpg.de

The Max Planck Institute for the Structure and Dynamics of Matter (MPSD; German: Max-Planck-Institut für Struktur und Dynamik der Materie) is a non-university research institute of the Max Planck Society (MPG). It is located in the Hamburg district of Bahrenfeld, on the campus of the Deutsches Elektronen-Synchrotron (DESY). The institute primarily conducts basic research in the natural sciences, in experimental and theoretical physics and chemistry. Its focus is on very fast physical processes and chemical reactions that can be studied by ultrafast spectroscopy using pulsed radiation sources such as the nearby free-electron lasers FLASH and European XFEL.

== History ==
The institute grew out of an existing Max Planck Society research group for structural dynamics at the University of Hamburg. The decision to establish an independent institute with five research departments and up to 120 permanent positions was announced in November 2012. The institute was officially founded on 1 January 2014 and initially consisted of two departments, headed by its two founding directors: Condensed Matter Dynamics, led by Andrea Cavalleri, and Atomically Resolved Dynamics, led by R. J. Dwayne Miller. The Theory Department under Ángel Rubio was added on 1 November 2014. Miller's department was dissolved when he left the MPSD on 30 June 2020. On 15 June 2021, Philip Moll was appointed director of the Microstructured Quantum Matter Department.

In 2024, Jie Shan and Kin Fai Mak were recruited as further directors. They joined the institute fully on 1 January 2025 and lead two jointly run departments of Nanoscale Quantum Materials, focusing on optics (Shan) and transport (Mak), bringing the number of departments to five.

== Building ==
Since its founding, the MPSD has used space in the neighbouring Center for Free-Electron Laser Science (CFEL) building, which it shares with DESY and the University of Hamburg. A separate institute building next to the CFEL, designed by hammeskrause architekten, was completed in 2023; a foundation slab up to 1.5 metres thick keeps its laboratories free of vibrations. The building was officially opened on 13 May 2024. Of its total construction cost of €54 million, the City of Hamburg contributed €37 million and the Max Planck Society the rest. The extension allowed the institute to grow from three to five departments.

== Departments ==
Departments of the MPSD
Department	Director	Period
Condensed Matter Dynamics	Andrea Cavalleri	since 2014
Theory	Ángel Rubio	since 2014
Microstructured Quantum Matter	Philip Moll	since 2021
Nanoscale Quantum Materials – Optics	Jie Shan	since 2025
Nanoscale Quantum Materials – Transport	Kin Fai Mak	since 2025
Atomically Resolved Dynamics (former)	R. J. Dwayne Miller	2014–2020

== Doctoral training ==
The MPSD hosts the International Max Planck Research School for Ultrafast Imaging and Structural Dynamics (IMPRS-UFAST), a structured doctoral programme founded in 2011 for doctoral students with backgrounds in physics, chemistry and biology.
