= Harnack Medal =

The highest award which is presented by the Max Planck Society for services to society is the Harnack Medal, first awarded in 1925. The Harnack Medal is named after the theologian Adolf von Harnack, who was the first president of the Kaiser Wilhelm Society, the predecessor organization of the MPG, from 1911 to 1930. The medal has only been awarded 33 times since 1924, including 10 times by the Kaiser Wilhelm Society (1924–1936) and 23 times by the Max Planck Society (1953–2017).

Past recipients of the Harnack Medal are:

- Edelgard Bulmahn 2025
- Daniel Zajfman 2023
- Angela Merkel 2021
- Peter Gruss 2017
- Hermann Neuhaus 2008
- Lu Yongxiang 2006
- Hubert Markl 2004
- Haim Harari 2001
- Hans F. Zacher 1998
- Michael Sela 1996
- Heinz A. Staab 1996
- Reimar Lüst 1993
- Richard von Weizsäcker 1990
- Hans Merkle 1984
- Kurt Birrenbach 1981
- Walther Gerlach 1974
- Adolf Butenandt 1973
- Carl Wurster 1970
- Alfred Kühn 1965
- Heinrich Lübke 1964
- Otto Heinrich Warburg 1963
- Georg Schreiber 1962
- Erich Kaufmann 1960
- Theodor Heuss 1959
- Otto Hahn 1954 (in Gold 1959)
- Gustav Winkler 1953
- Ludwig Prandtl 1936
- Albert Vögler 1936
- Carl Duisberg 1934
- Max Planck 1933
- Gustav Krupp von Bohlen und Halbach 1933
- Franz von Mendelssohn 1932
- Carl Correns 1932
- Friedrich Schmidt-Ott 1929
- Fritz Haber 1926
- Adolf von Harnack 1925
