= Gustav Winkler =

Gustav Winkler (11 May 1867 in Liegnitz – 26 April 1954 in Berlin) was a German industrialist. He led the "Gustav Winkler Textilwerke" in Lauban and produced mostly textile hanckerchives. He cooperated with the Kaiser Wilhelm Society in the research for the improvement in the production of textiles. Winkler held the position of a Senator in the supervising committee of the Kaiser Wilhelm Society from 1936 till 1945. In 1953 he received the Harnack medal of the Max Planck Society in 1953.
