= Beate Paulus =

German chemist

Academic background
- Education: University of Regensburg
- Alma mater: Max Planck Institute for the Physics of Complex Systems
- Thesis: Electronic correlations in semiconductors

Academic work
- Discipline: Theoretical chemistry
- Institutions: Free University of Berlin

Beate Paulus is a German chemist and professor of theoretical chemistry at the Free University of Berlin (FU Berlin).

== Career ==
Paulus studied physics at the University of Regensburg from 1987 to 1993, She graduated with a thesis under J. Keller entitled "Electrical conductivity in fullerides" From 1993 to 1995, she was a doctoral student at the Max Planck Institute for the Physics of Complex Systems in Stuttgart and later Dresden. The title of her dissertation was "Electronic correlations in semiconductors". From 1996 she was also a postdoctoral fellow there. In December 2005 she completed her habilitation in Regensburg. Since 2007, she is a professor of theoretical chemistry at the FU Berlin.
