= Emil J. Bergholtz =

Swedish theoretical physicist

Emil J. Bergholtz is a Swedish theoretical physicist and professor at Stockholm University. He has held research positions at the Max Planck Institute for the Physics of Complex Systems in Dresden, Germany, and at the Free University of Berlin, where he led an independent research group.

His research focuses on topology, geometry and correlation effects in quantum matter, including work on non-Hermitian systems and fractional Chern insulators.

== Awards ==
- Wallenberg Scholar (2024)
- Göran Gustafsson Prize in Physics (2022)
