= List of IBS Centers =

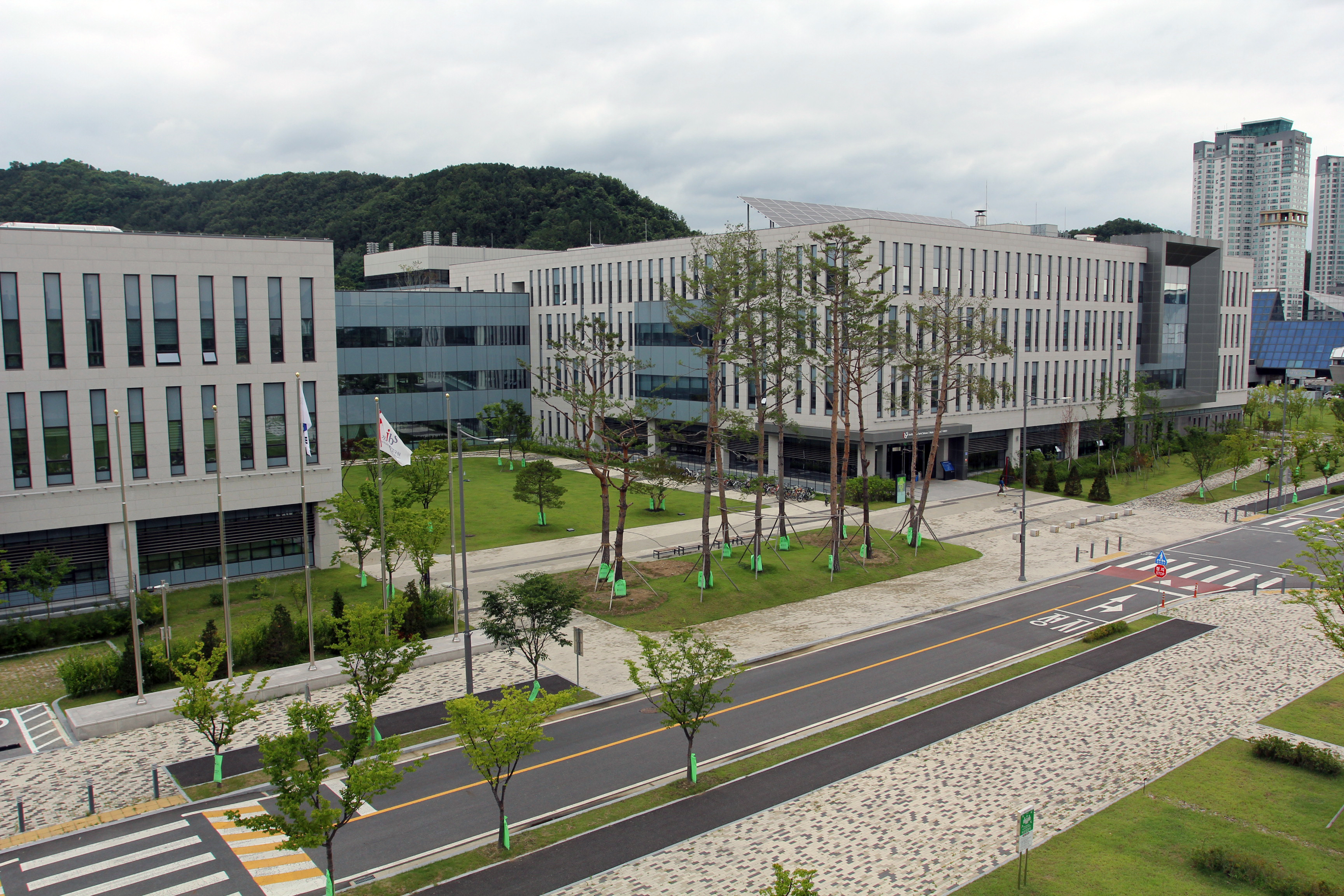
IBS Headquarters

IBS Centers are research centers operated by the Institute for Basic Science. There are 31 institutes as of August 2020. Centers are organized into six disciplines according to their research area:

- Physics
- Chemistry
- Life sciences
- Interdisciplinary
- Mathematics
- Earth science

== HQ, campus, and extramural ==
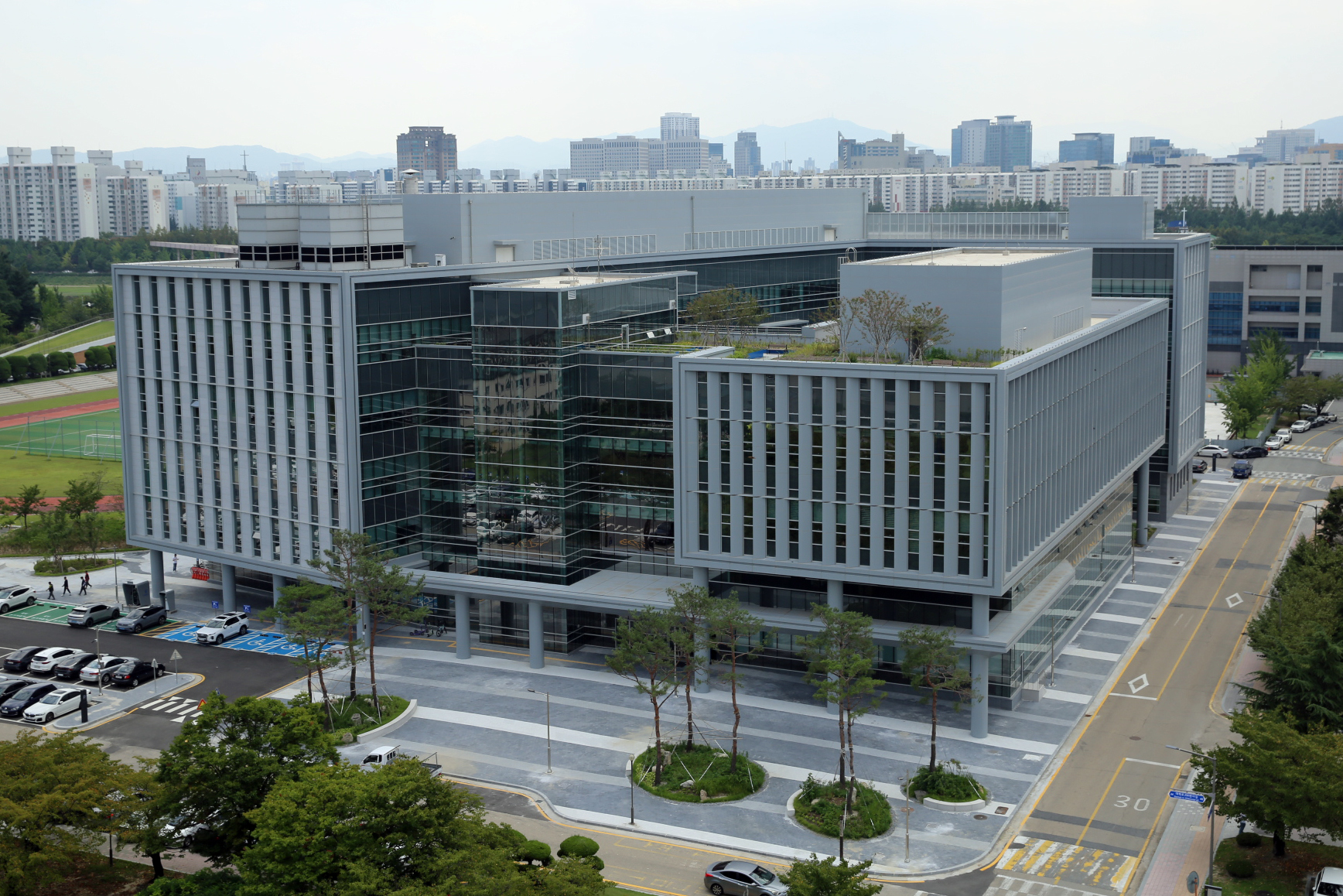
IBS–KAIST Campus Building

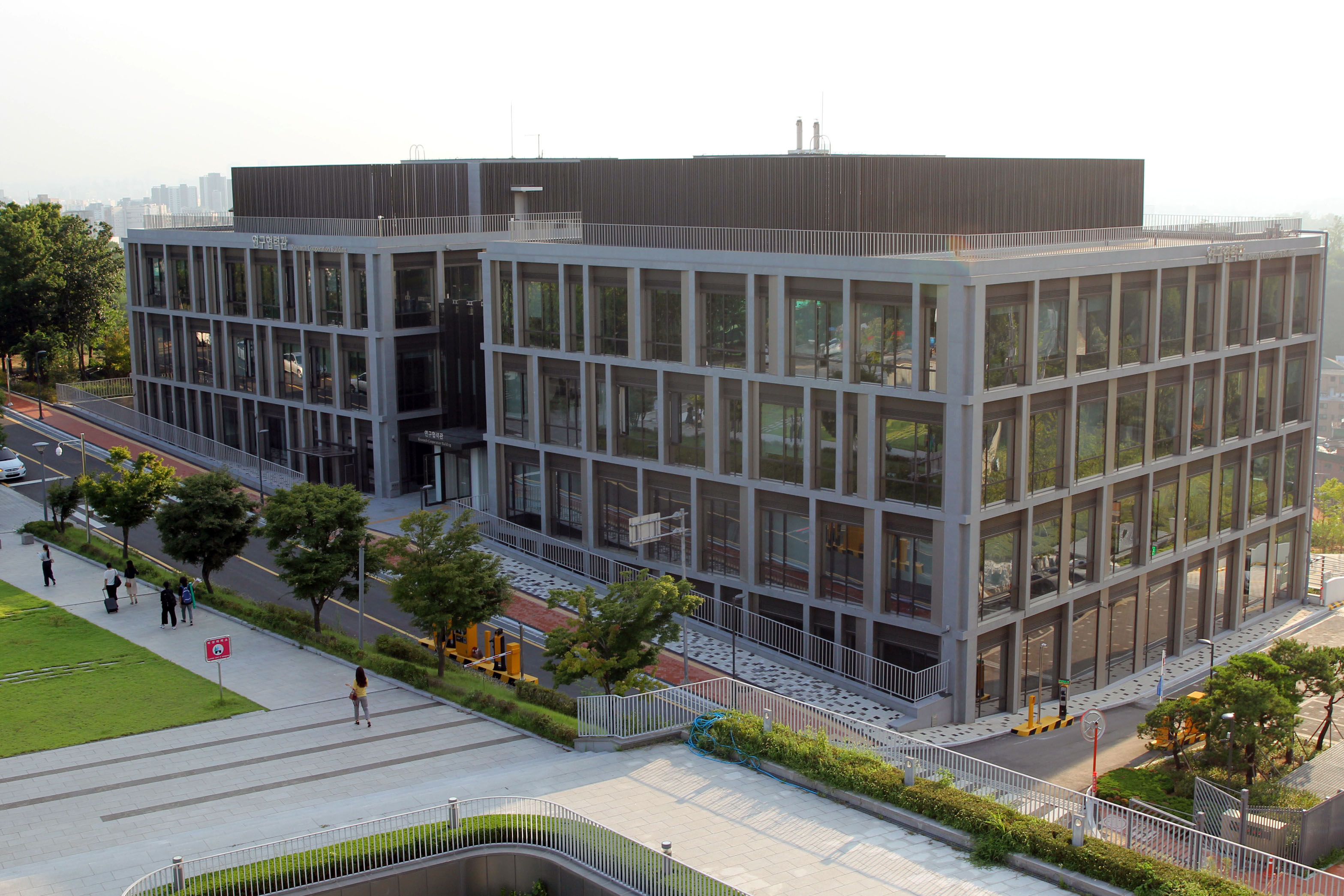
IBS–Ewha Research Collaboration Center

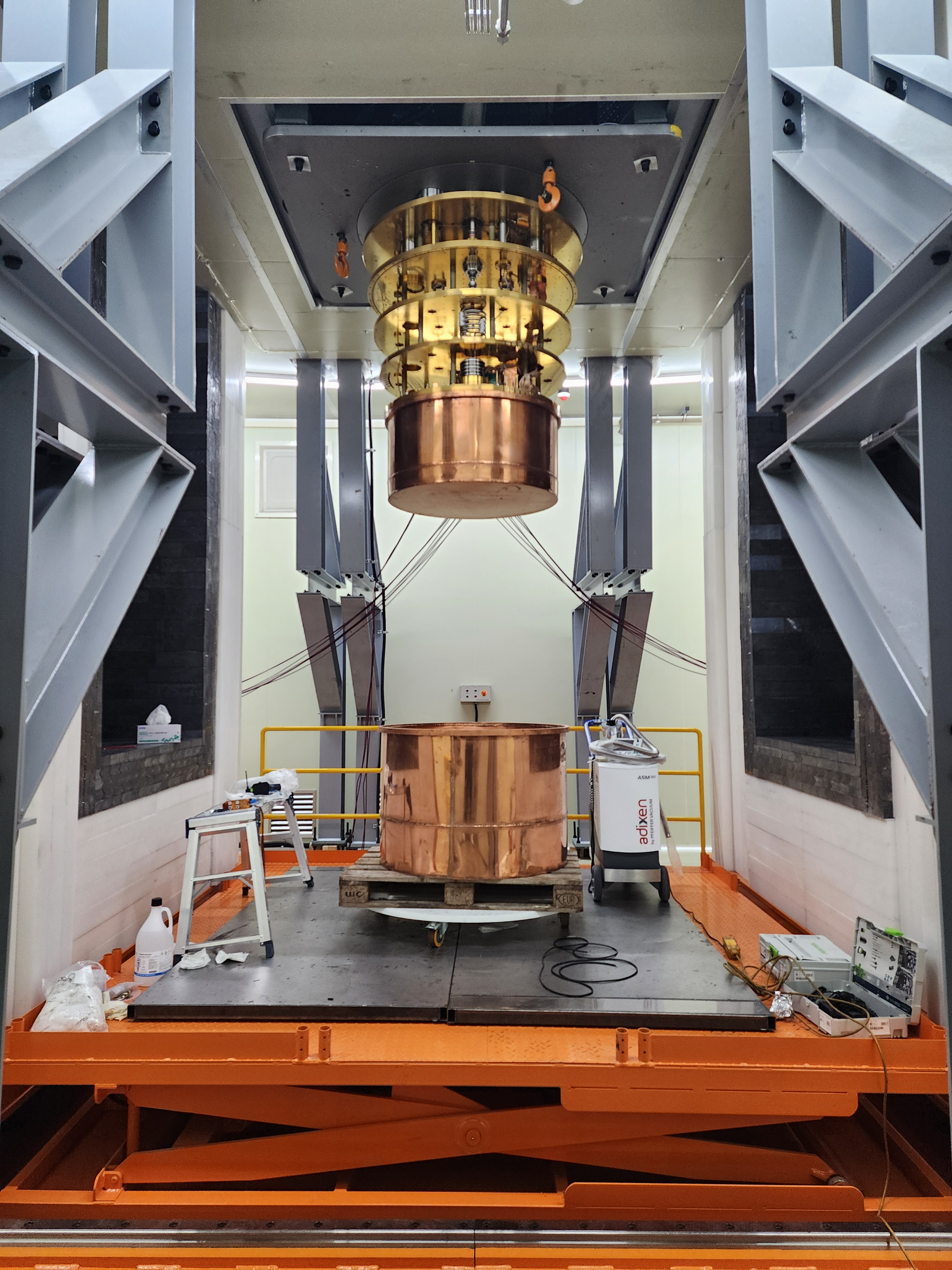
AMoRE muon veto system at Yemilab

As of March 2025, the following HQ, campus, and extramural IBS Centers exist (in alphabetical order):

Name	Director	City, university	Research area
Center for 2D Quantum Heterostructures	Shin Hyeon Suk	Daejeon, Sungkyunkwan University	Interdisciplinary
Center for Advanced Reaction Dynamics	Ihee Hyotcherl	Daejeon, KAIST	Chemistry
Center for Algorithmic and Robotized Synthesis (Formerly Center for Soft and Living Matter)	Bartosz Grzybowski	Ulsan, UNIST	Interdisciplinary
Center for Artificial Low Dimensional Electronic Systems	Yeom Han-woong	Pohang, POSTECH	Physics
Center for Axion and Precision Physics Research - Dark Matter Axion Group	Youn SungWoo	Daejeon, HQ	Physics
Center for Catalytic Hydrocarbon Functionalizations	Chang Sukbok	Daejeon, KAIST	Chemistry
Center for Climate Physics	Axel Timmermann	Busan, Pusan National University	Earth science
Center for Cognition and Sociality - Cognitive Glioscience Group	Changjoon Justin Lee	Daejeon, HQ	Life sciences
Center for Cognition and Sociality - Learning and Memory Group	Kaang Bong-Kiun	Daejeon, HQ	Life sciences
Center for Complex Geometry	Hwang Jun-Muk	Daejeon, HQ	Mathematics
Center for Correlated Electron Systems	Noh Tae-won	Seoul, Seoul National University	Physics
Center for Van der Waals Quantum Solids	Jo Moon-Ho	Pohang, POSTECH	Physics
Center for Exotic Nuclear Studies	Kevin Insik Hahn	Daejeon, HQ	Physics
Center for Genome Engineering	Koo Bon-Kyoung	Seoul, Seoul National University	Interdisciplinary
Center for Genomic Integrity	Myung Kyungjae	Ulsan, UNIST	Life sciences
Center for Geometry and Physics	Yong-Geun Oh	Pohang, POSTECH	Mathematics
Center for Integrated Nanostructure Physics	Lee Young Hee	Suwon, Sungkyunkwan University	Physics
Center for Molecular Spectroscopy and Dynamics	Cho Minhaeng	Seoul, Korea University	Chemistry
Center for Multidimensional Carbon Materials	Rodney S. Ruoff	Ulsan, UNIST	Chemistry
Center for Nanomaterials and Chemical Reactions	Ryoo Ryong	Daejeon, KAIST	Chemistry
Center for Nanomedicine	Cheon Jinwoo	Seoul, Yonsei University	Interdisciplinary
Center for Nanoparticle Research	Hyeon Taeghwan	Seoul, Seoul National University	Chemistry
Center for Neuroscience Imaging Research - Neuro Technology Group	Kim Seong-gi	Suwon, Sungkyunkwan University	Interdisciplinary
Center for Neuroscience Imaging Research - Cognitive and Computational Neuroscience Group	Lau Hakwan	Suwon, Sungkyunkwan University	Interdisciplinary
Center for Quantum Conversion Research	Kim Yousoo	Gwangju, GIST	Interdisciplinary
Center for Quantum Nanoscience	Andreas J. Heinrich	Seoul, Ewha Womans University	Physics
Center for Relativistic Laser Science	Kim Kyung Taec	Gwangju, GIST	Physics
Center for RNA Research	Kim V. Narry	Seoul, Seoul National University	Life sciences
Center for Self-assembly and Complexity	Kim Kimoon	Pohang, POSTECH	Chemistry
Center for Study of Emerging and Re-emerging Viruses	Choi Young Ki	Daejeon, KAIST	Life sciences
Center for Synaptic Brain Dysfunctions	Kim EunJoon	Daejeon, KAIST	Life sciences
Center for Theoretical Physics of Complex Systems	Sergej Flach	Daejeon, HQ	Physics
Center for Theoretical Physics of the Universe (Particle Theory and Cosmology Group)	Choi Kiwoon	Daejeon, HQ	Physics
Center for Theoretical Physics of the Universe (Cosmology, Gravity and Astroparticle Physics Group)	Yamaguchi Masahide (山口昌英 [ヤマグチ マサヒデ])	Daejeon, HQ	Physics
Center for Underground Physics	Kim Yeongduk (ko)	Daejeon, HQ	Physics
Center for Vascular Research	Koh Gou Young	Daejeon, KAIST	Life sciences

== Pioneer research centers ==
Pioneer Research Centers (PRC) are headquarters-based centers headed not by a director, but by a group of up to five chief investigators. As of August 2022, the following IBS pioneer research centers exist (in alphabetical order):

Name	Group	Chief investigator	Research area
PRC for Biomolecular and Cellular Structure	Biomolecular Sociology Group	Woo Jae-Sung	Interdisciplinary
PRC for Climate and Earth Science	Planetary Atmospheres Group	Lee Yeon Joo	Earth science
PRC for Mathematical and Computational Sciences	Biomedical Mathematics Group	Kim Jae Kyoung	Mathematics
PRC for Mathematical and Computational Sciences	Discrete Mathematics Group	Oum Sang-il	Mathematics
PRC for Mathematical and Computational Sciences	Extremal Combinatorics and Probability Group	Liu Hong	Mathematics

== Former centers ==
Name	Director	City, University	Research area	Closure date
Academy of Immunology and Microbiology	Charles Surh	Pohang, POSTECH	Life sciences	October 2019
Center for Plant Aging Research	Nam Hong Gil	Daegu, DGIST	Life sciences	August 2021
Center for Viral Immunology	Shin Eui-Cheol	Daejeon, KAIST	Life sciences	

== See also ==
- List of Max Planck Institutes
- List of Johns Hopkins University Research Centers and Institutes
- National Institute for Mathematical Sciences
- RAON
