= Reining (surname) =

Reining is a surname. Notable people with the surname include:

- Lucia Reining (born 1961), German physicist
- Maria Reining (1903–1991), Austrian soprano
- Priscilla Reining (1923–2007), American applied anthropologist
