= Jan Rost =

German physicist

Jan M. Rost (born 1961) is a German theoretical physicist and director at the Max Planck Institute for the Physics of Complex Systems in Dresden heading the research department Finite Systems. He was awarded the status of Fellow in the American Physical Society, after nomination by the Division of Atomic, Molecular & Optical Physics in 2007, for seminal investigations of correlated doubly excited states, threshold fragmentation in few-body Coulombic systems and small clusters, pendular states of linear molecules, and for elucidating the role of correlation and relaxation in ultracold plasmas and Rydberg gases.

His research interests reach from ultracold to ultrafast dynamics in finite systems including Rydberg excitation and ionization. Former group leaders of his department include Andreas Buchleitner, Andreas Becker, Klaus Hornberger, Stefan Skupin, Nina Rohringer, and Thomas Pohl.

He was Editor in Chief of Journal of Physics B, chairman of the SAMOP section of the German Physical Society, chair of the Chemical-Physical-Technical Section of the Max Planck Society and is presently lead editor of Physical Review A and member of the Wissenschaftsrat advising German Science politics.

== Controversy ==
In 2025, an investigative unit of the German broadcaster Deutsche Welle and Der Spiegel released a documentary alleging that Jan Rost perpetrated abusive behavior and misconduct towards several members of the Max Planck Institute for the Physics of Complex Systems in Dresden.

== See also ==
- List of fellows of the American Physical Society (1998–2010)
