= Andrea Cavalleri =

Italian physicist

Andrea Cavalleri (born 1969) is an Italian physicist who specializes in optical science and in condensed matter physics. He is the founding director of the Max Planck Institute for the Structure and Dynamics of Matter in Hamburg, Germany and a professor of Physics at the University of Oxford. He was awarded the 2018 Frank Isakson Prize for his pioneering work on ultrafast optical spectroscopy applied to condensed matter systems.

== Scientific achievements ==
Cavalleri is known for his application of light to create new states of matter, and especially for the use of terahertz and mid-infrared optical pulses to sculpt new crystal structures. The field of research pioneered by Cavalleri is sometimes referred to as non-linear phononics.

He has shown that phononic control can be used to create new crystal structures with light, to induce hidden metallic states in oxides, induce ferroelectricity in dielectrics, manipulate magnetism and create non-equilibrium superconductivity at very high temperatures. Cavalleri has also been amongst the people who applied the first femtosecond X-ray pulses to condensed matter systems, for example in his studies of photo-induced phase transitions.

== Scientific career ==
He received his laurea degree and PhD at the University of Pavia, as a student of Almo Collegio Borromeo, in 1994 and 1998 respectively. Cavalleri has held research positions at the University of Essen, the University of California, San Diego and the Lawrence Berkeley National Laboratory. In 2005, he joined the faculty of the University of Oxford, where he was promoted to Professor of Physics in 2006. He joined the Max Planck Society in 2008.

== Selected honors and awards ==
He is a recipient of the 2004 European Science Foundation Young Investigator Award, of the 2015 Max Born Medal from the Institute of Physics (UK) and the Deutsche Physikalische Gesellschaft and of the 2015 Dannie Heineman Prize from the Göttingen Academy of Sciences. The American Physical Society awarded Cavalleri the 2018 Frank Isakson Prize for Optical Effects in Solids "for pioneering contributions to the development and application of ultra-fast optical spectroscopy to condensed matter systems, and providing insight into lattice dynamics, structural phase transitions, and the non-equilibrium control of solids". Cavalleri received the CMD Europhysics Prize in 2024 and the Stern-Gerlach-Medaille der DPG in 2026. He is an elected fellow of the American Physical Society, the American Association for the Advancement of Science and the Institute of Physics (UK). He was elected a member of the Academia Europaea in 2017 and a fellow of the European Academy of Sciences in 2018.
