= Angel Rubio =

Angel Rubio or Ángel Rubio may refer to:

- Angel Rubio (American football) (born 1975), American professional football player
- Ángel Rubio (composer) (1846–1907), Spanish composer
- Ángel Rubio (physicist) (born 1965), Spanish theoretical physicist
- Angel Rubio, a character in the Resident Evil TV series
- Ángel Rubio Castro, a bishop in the Archdiocese of Toledo
