= Katharina Pistor =

German legal scholar and professor of comparative law

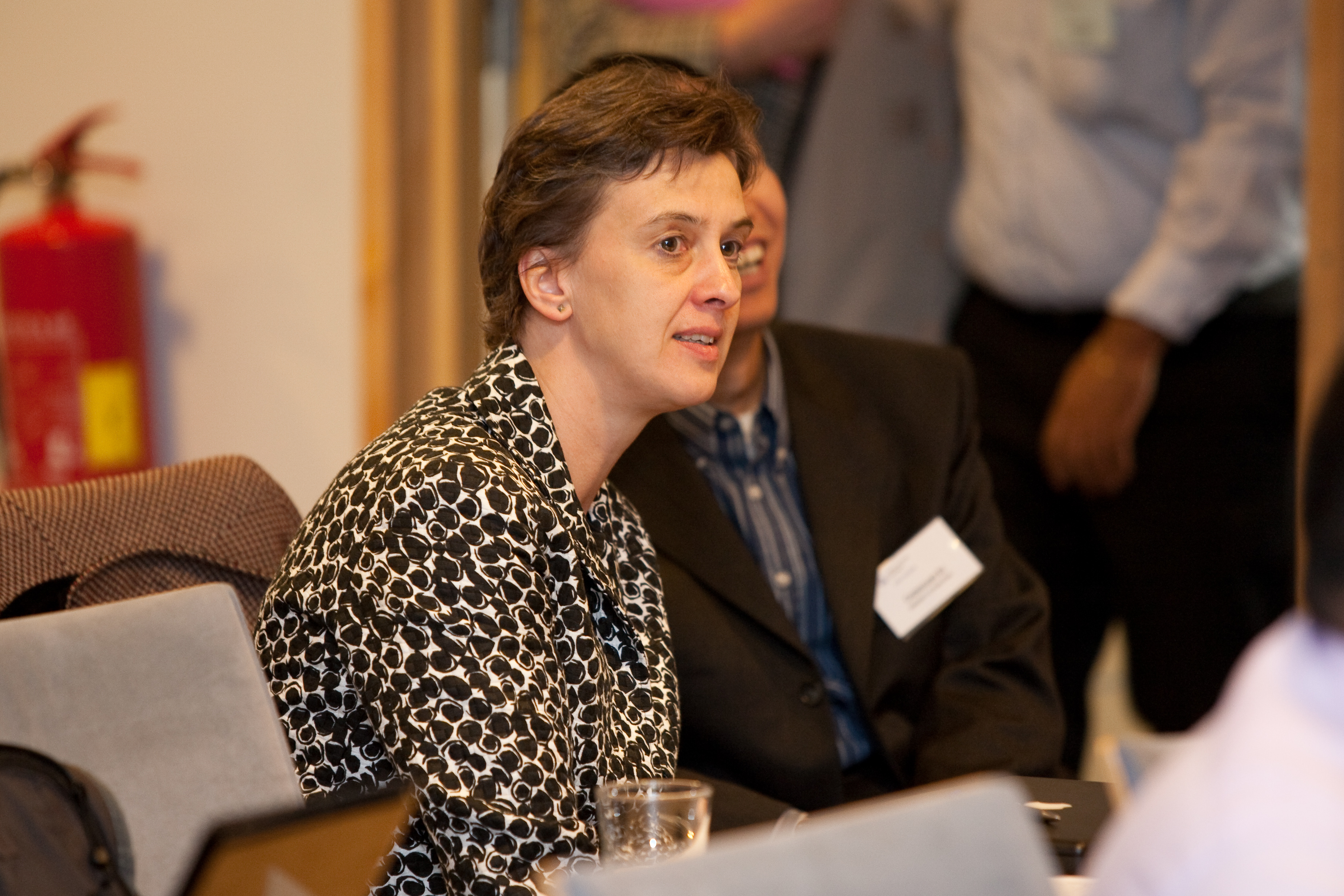
- Born: 23 May 1963 (age 63); Freiburg, Germany
- Known for: Legal coding of capital; the legal foundations of money and finance; law and political economy
- Awards: Max Planck Research Award (2012); Member, Berlin-Brandenburg Academy of Sciences and Humanities (2015); Member of the Academia Europaea (2021)

Academic background
- Education: University of Freiburg (Law); University of London (LL.M.); Harvard Kennedy School (M.P.A.); LMU Munich Faculty of Law (Dr. jur., J.S.D.)

Academic work
- Institutions: Max Planck Institute for Comparative and International Private Law; Kennedy School of Government; Columbia Law School

Katharina Pistor (born 23 May 1963 in Freiburg im Breisgau, Germany) is a legal scholar from Germany who is known for her work on legal transplants, the legal institutions that form financial systems, and the legal foundations of capitalism. She is the Edwin B. Parker Professor of Comparative Law at Columbia Law School, where she teaches corporate law, law and development, and law and finance. She co-directs Columbia University’s Center for Political Economy.

== Early life and education ==
Pistor was born in Freiburg, Germany. She studied law at the University of Freiburg and earned an LL.M. from the University of London. She completed her legal clerkship in Hamburg and received an M.P.A. from the Harvard Kennedy School. She earned her Dr. jur. (J.S.D.) summa cum laude from LMU Munich's Faculty of Law in 1998.

== Academic career ==
Pistor began her academic career with research and teaching appointments at the Harvard Institute for International Development and the Max Planck Institute for Comparative and International Private Law in Hamburg, and at the Kennedy School of Government (Harvard University) as an assistant professor from 2000 to 2001.

She joined the faculty of Columbia Law School in 2001 as an associate professor and became a full professor in 2005. She held the Michael I. Sovern Professorship of Law from 2008 to 2018 before being appointed Edwin B. Parker Professor of Comparative Law in 2018.

== Research ==
Pistor’s early research focused on the legal and economic transformation of the former socialist countries. A critic of the radical economic reform experiments launched in the region, she devoted her research to understanding the relationship between legal and economic change; the effect of legal transplantation on the legitimacy of law in the recipient countries; and the legal foundations of finance and money.

Since the Great Financial Crisis of 2008, she has focused increasingly on the capitalist world. In 2013, she published “A Legal Theory of Finance”, the product of an interdisciplinary research project funded by the Institute for New Economic Thinking (INET). The paper received the Allen & Overy Prize from the European Corporate Governance Institute.

Her book The Code of Capital: How the Law Creates Wealth and Inequality (2019) shows how capital is coded in law by combining legal devices—such as property rights, collateral, business organization, bankruptcy, and contract law—with different objects, promises, or ideas. The book was named one of the best books of 2019 by the Financial Times and Business Insider. In 2025, she published The Law of Capitalism and How to Transform It. The book explains how capitalism has been able to reconstitute itself through private law in the face of regulatory constraints; Pistor argues that transforming capitalism must come through law and requires a normative reset of private law.

In October 2024, Pistor delivered the Adorno Lectures at the Institute for Social Research in Frankfurt on the constitution of the global monetary system and how it might be reconstituted.

== Selected works ==
- Economic Development, Legality, and the Transplant Effect (with Dan Berkowitz and Jean-Francois Richard), European Economic Review 47(1): 165–195 (2003)
- Incomplete Law (with Chenggang Xu), Journal of International Law and Politics 35(4): 931–1013 (2003)
- A Legal Theory of Finance, Journal of Comparative Economics 41(2): 315–330 (2013)
- Governing Essential Resources (co-edited with Olivier De Schutter, 2015)
- Rule by Data: The End of Markets?, Journal of Law and Contemporary Problems 83(2): 101–124 (2020)
- The Code of Capital: How the Law Creates Wealth and Inequality (2019)
- The Law of Capitalism and How to Transform It (2025)

== Awards and honors ==
- 2012 – Max Planck Research Award on International Financial Regulation, Max Planck Society
- 2015 – Member, Berlin-Brandenburg Academy of Sciences and Humanities
- 2020 – Doctor honoris causa, Erasmus University Rotterdam
- 2021 – Member, Academia Europaea
- 2024 – Doctor honoris causa, University of Antwerp
- 2024 – Member, Club of Rome
