= Ultrabright electron =

Atomic imaging tool

Ultrabright electrons are an advanced atomic imaging tool that can allow scientists to view atoms and molecules in motion. They were developed at the Max Planck Institute for the Structure and Dynamics of Matter in Hamburg, Germany and at the University of Toronto with the teams led by Professor R.J.D. Miller.

== Brightness ==
The brightness of an electron beam is defined for any given point as the current per unit area normal to the given direction, per unit solid angle. Mathematically this is defined using limits as the area and solid angle tend to 0. The general formula is:

$B= \lim_{\delta A \to 0} \lim_{\delta\Omega \to 0} \frac{\delta I}{\delta A \delta \Omega}$

An ultrabright electron beam has been defined as having >10 A/cm^{2} with spatial coherence of >1 nm. This level of energy with that small amount of coherence is a large technical problem, not only in the production of such a beam, but also how to use the beam without destroying the sample in the process of characterization. The singular problem of sample destruction was taken care of by studying reactions that are photo-active and prepared in such a way that reduced potential barriers.

== Non-relativistic ultrabright electron spectroscopy ==
In non-relativistic electrons the problems of achieving ultrabrightness was overcome by utilizing the natural chirp that occurs in electron shot bunches. To capitalize on this chirp the developed gun was made as compact as possible with a magnetic lens around the electron pulse radio-frequency (RF) gap. By continuing to use spatial compression in conjunction with the electron bunch chirp allowed the gun to be able to resolve in a 200-fs time frame, with up to 10^9 electrons/cm^2, and with enough coherence to study unit cells of up to 6 nm. It is believed that this technique will be able to be advanced by at least two orders of magnitude in the near future.

This method was used to observe the charge delocalization in the organic salt (EDO-TTF)2PF6 as it undergoes a photo-induced insulator-to-metal phase transition. The motion observed revealed the reduction in dimensionality that takes place at transitional moments in chemical reactions, which is a major theoretical breakthrough in understanding how there can be repeated patterns in chemistry among molecules of vastly different dimensions.

== Relativistic ultrabright electron spectroscopy ==
Relativistic ultrabright electron spectroscopy has developed rapidly through the work of the Max Planck Institute for the Structure and Dynamics of Matter in Hamburg, Germany in building the Relativistic Electron Gun for Atomic Exploration (REGAE). This tool has allowed the problem of electron scattering to be much reduced through the use of an RF gap in an even more effective manner than with non-relativistic elections, which has allowed the REGAE to be able to probe deeply into samples in the 10-fs time frame with a spatial coherence of >20 nm, meaning that it can be used to study protein movements.

Using the REGAE the ring closing dynamics of diarylethene were observed in real time, and they too revealed an intense reduction in dimensionality as the nuclei went through the tipping point of the reaction.
