= Martin Stratmann =

German chemist and engineer

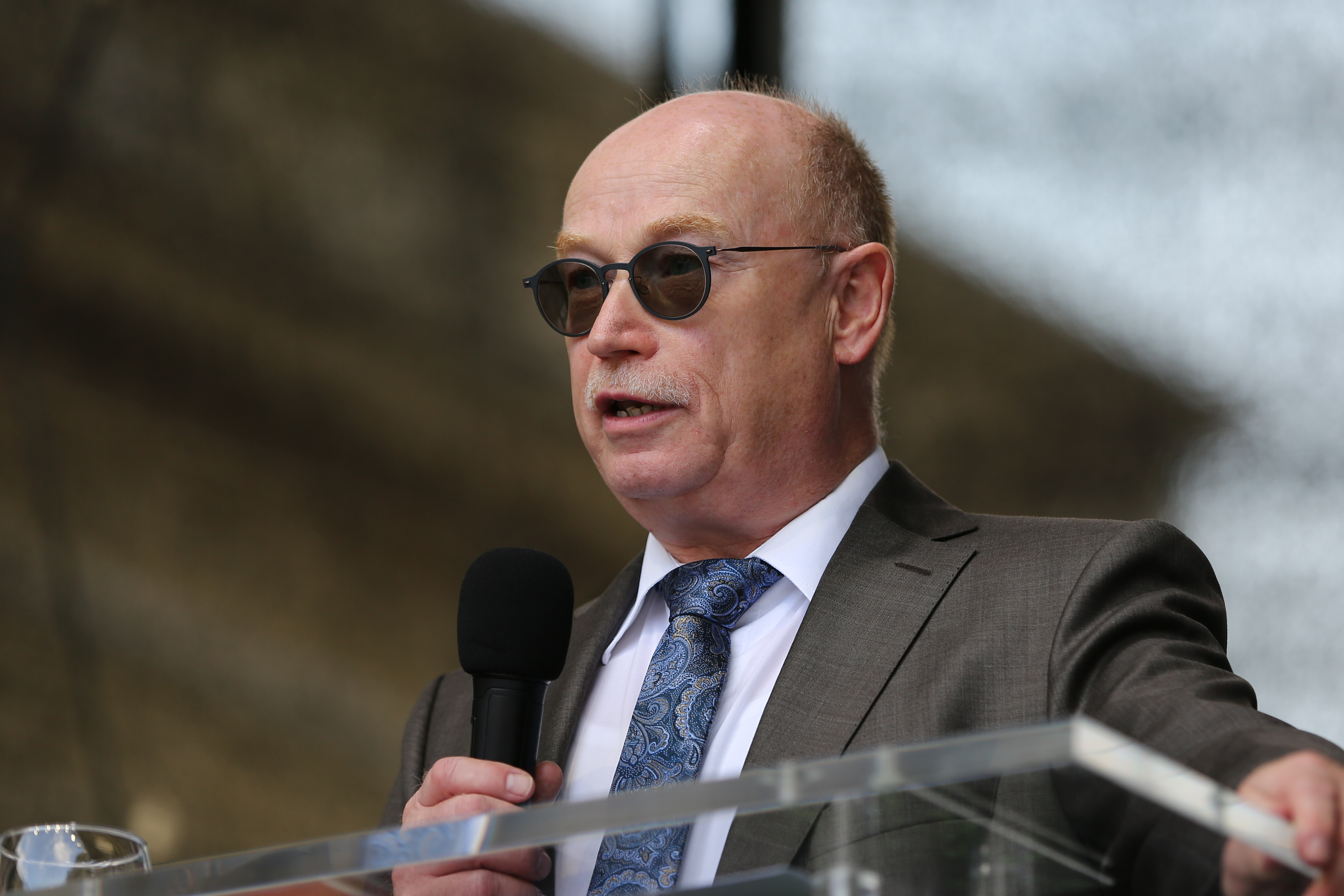
Stratmann in 2018

Martin Stratmann (born 20 April 1954 in Essen, West Germany) is a German electrochemist and materials scientist. He is one of the directors at the Max-Planck-Institut für Eisenforschung (Max-Planck-Institute for Iron Research) in Düsseldorf since 2000, and heads its department of Interface Chemistry and Surface Engineering.

Stratmann was the vice president of the Max Planck Society from 2008 and its president from July 2014 until 22 June 2023.

== Professional career ==
After finishing his Abitur (A-levels) in 1973 at the grammar school in Traben-Trarbach (Rhineland-Palatinate, south-west Germany), and after his military service, Stratmann studied chemistry at the Ruhr University Bochum. Stratmann received his diploma about NMR-analysis of the diffusion of anions and cations in SrCl_{2} in 1979. He did his doctorate on the topic of electrochemical analysis of phase transitions in corrosion layers at the Max-Planck-Institut für Eisenforschung (MPIE) in 1982. Between 1983 and 1984, he continued his research at the Case Western Reserve University in Cleveland (USA) as a scholarship holder of the Max Planck Society. After his return to the MPIE, he worked until 1987 as a scientific assistant in the group of corrosion science. In 1987, he became head of this group. In 1994 Stratmann was appointed to a professorship for corrosion and surface engineering as a successor of H. Kaesche at the Friedrich Alexander University in Erlangen-Nürnberg (Bavaria) and remained there till 1999. In 2000, Stratmann returned to the MPIE as a scientific member and director of the department "Interface Chemistry and Surface Engineering". Two years later he was chosen to be the chief-executive (rotationally until 2010).

From 2006 until 2008, Stratmann chaired the chemical-physical-technical section of the Max Planck Society and was appointed vice president of the Max Planck Society in 2008. He is the manager of the Minerva Foundation, an affiliate of the Max Planck Society, since 2008.

== Research interests ==
The research interests of Martin Stratmann concentrate on electrochemistry and corrosion science. He connects electrochemical, spectroscopic and interface analytical methods and was the first one who used the scanning Kelvin probe technique in corrosion science. With this method he was able to show that electrochemical reaction analysis is possible even under ultrathin electrolytic films and non-conducting coatings. With the help of the Kelvin probe, Stratmann was able to explain the atmospheric corrosion of iron and iron based alloys, and the de-adhesion of polymer coatings of reactive metallic surfaces. With the insight that the formation of electrochemical elements and especially the reduction of molecular oxygen is the key factor to understand the stability of metal-polymer bonds, Stratmann and his team developed new interface-chemical concepts to increase the stability of these bonds which finally lead to self-healing processes of defect interfaces. These concepts were also transferred into industrial applications.

== Other activities ==
- Alexander von Humboldt Foundation, Member of the Board of Trustees
- Alfred Wegener Institute for Polar and Marine Research (AWI), Member of the Scientific Advisory Board
- Center of Advanced European Studies and Research, Member of the Board of Trustees
- German Future Prize, Member of the Board of Trustees
- Ernst Reuter Foundation for Advanced Study, Member of the Board of Trustees
- Ernst Strüngmann Institute (ESI), Member of the Board
- Leibniz Association, Ex-Officio Member of the Senate
- Robert Koch Foundation, Member of the Board of Trustees
- Stifterverband für die Deutsche Wissenschaft, Ex-Officio Member of the Board
- Technical University of Munich (TUM), Member of the Board of Trustees

== Recognition ==
- 1985 Otto Hahn Medal of the Max Planck Society for the research on the reactions of phase interfaces and solid state bodies during the growth of corrosion layers
- 1990 Masing Award of the German Society for Material Science (Deutsche Gesellschaft für Materialkunde) for the research on corrosion reactions under thin electrolyte films
- 1995 DECHEMA Award of the Max Buchner Research Foundation
- 2005 Willis Rodney Whitney Award of the National Association of Corrosion Engineers (NRACE)
- 2005 UR Evans Award of the British Institute of Corrosion
- 2008 H. H. Uhlig Award of the Electrochemical Society

Stratmann is a fellow of the Electrochemical Society and member of Acatech (German Academy of Engineering Sciences) and the North Rhine-Westphalian Academy of Sciences, Humanities and the Arts. Together with Allan Bard, he is editor in chief of the comprehensive encyclopedia of electrochemistry.

Non-profit organization positions
Preceded by Peter Gruss	President of Max Planck Society; 2014—2023	Succeeded by Patrick Cramer
