= Lucia Reining =

German theoretical spectroscopist

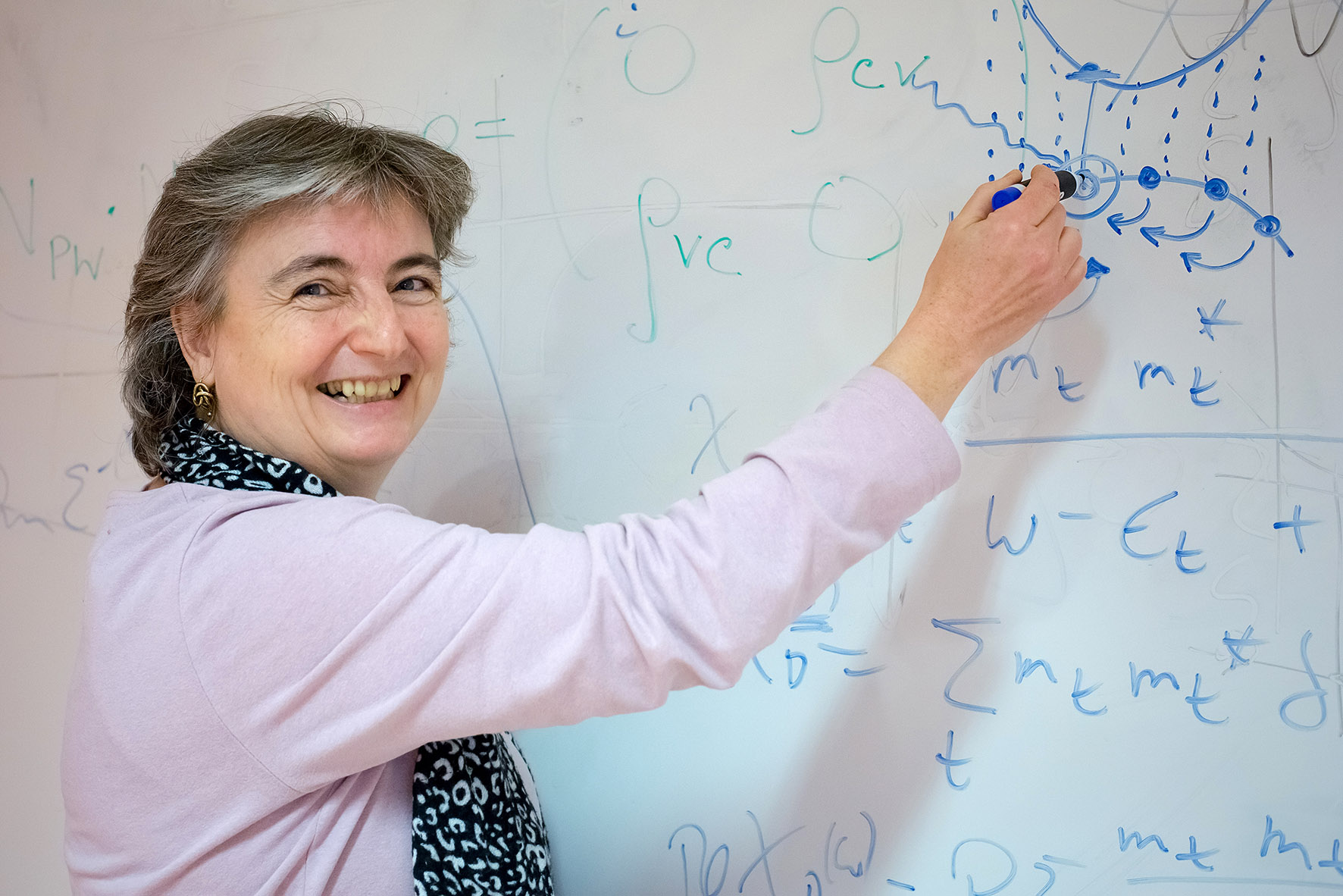
- Reining in 2013
- Born: 13 September 1961 (age 64)
- Education: RWTH Aachen University; University of Rome Tor Vergata
- Occupation: Spectroscopist Researcher
- Known for: Over 150 publications and numerous awards, including CNRS Silver Medal

Lucia Reining (born 13 September 1961) is a German theoretical spectroscopist who used to work in France as a director of research with the French National Centre for Scientific Research (CNRS), in the Laboratoire des Solides Irradiés at the École Polytechnique.

== Education and career ==
Reining studied physics at RWTH Aachen University beginning in 1980, with Ivan Egry as a faculty mentor, earning a diploma there in 1985. Reining completed her doctoral studies with Rodolfo Del Sole at the University of Rome Tor Vergata, completing her Ph.D. in 1991.

After a Marie-Curie postdoctoral fellowship at the Centre Européen de Calcul Atomique et Moléculaire in Orsay, Reining became a researcher for the CNRS in 1992. She was promoted to director of research in 2002, and to director of research in 2016.

Lucia Reining is one of the founding members of the European Theoretical Spectroscopy Facility.

== Recognition ==
Reining won the CNRS Silver Medal in 2003. She was elected as a Fellow of the American Physical Society (APS) in 2007, after a nomination from the APS Division of Computational Physics, "for her fundamental contributions to ab initio computation of spectroscopic properties of solids, employing many-electron Green's function and time-dependent density functional approaches".

She was the 2020 winner of the Gentner-Kastler Prize of the Société Française de Physique and German Physical Society.

== Selected publications ==
- Albrecht, Stefan; Reining, Lucia; Del Sole, Rodolfo; Onida, Giovanni (May 1998), "Ab initio calculation of excitonic effects in the optical spectra of semiconductors", Physical Review Letters, 80 (20): 4510–4513, arXiv:cond-mat/9803194, Bibcode:1998PhRvL..80.4510A, doi:10.1103/PhysRevLett.80.4510
- Onida, Giovanni; Reining, Lucia; Rubio, Angel (June 2002), "Electronic excitations: density-functional versus many-body Green's-function approaches", Reviews of Modern Physics, 74 (2): 601–659, Bibcode:2002RvMP...74..601O, doi:10.1103/revmodphys.74.601, hdl:10261/98472
- Martin, Richard M.; Reining, Lucia; Ceperley, David M. (2016), Interacting Electrons: Theory and Computational Approaches, Cambridge University Press, doi:10.1017/cbo9781139050807, ISBN 978-1-139-05080-7
