= Jie Shan =

Chinese-American scientist

- Born: Zhejiang
- Education: Moscow State University; Columbia University
- Scientific career
- Workplaces: Cornell University; Pennsylvania State University; Case Western Reserve University
- Website: Mak Shan Group

Jie Shan is a Chinese-American scientist who is Professor of Physics and Head of Graduate Studies at Cornell University. Her research considers the advanced characterization of two dimensional materials. She was elected Fellow of the American Physical Society in 2013.

== Early life and education ==
Shan grew up in Zhejiang. At school she liked mathematics and chemistry. She earned her undergraduate diploma at Moscow State University. She moved to Columbia University for graduate studies, where she worked with Tony Heinz on optical spectroscopy, and developed a table-top coherent terahertz technology.

== Research and career ==
In 2002, Shan joined Case Western Reserve University as an assistant professor in the physics department. She joined Pennsylvania State University in 2014, where she was promoted to professor. She moved to Cornell University in 2018. Shan studies the optoelectronic properties of single-layer materials. She is particularly interested in Molybdenum disulfide (MoS_{2}) and graphene. She developed linear and non linear spectroscopies and advanced microscopies to understand their steady-state and dynamic phenomena. In 2024, she became the director of the Max Planck Institute for the Structure and Dynamics of Matter in Hamburg.

== Awards and honors ==
- 2010 Scialog Award for Science Advancement
- 2013 Fellow of the American Physical Society
- 2021 Mildred Dresselhaus Prize

== Selected publications ==
- Mak, Kin Fai; Lee, Changgu; Hone, James; Shan, Jie; Heinz, Tony F (2010). "Atomically thin MoS₂: a new direct-gap semiconductor". Physical Review Letters. 105 (13) 136805. arXiv:1004.0546. doi:10.1103/physrevlett.105.136805. PMID 21230799. Wikidata Q21706555.
- Sheneve Z Butler; Shawna M Hollen; Linyou Cao; et al. (2013). "Progress, challenges, and opportunities in two-dimensional materials beyond graphene". ACS Nano. 7 (4): 2898–2926. doi:10.1021/nn400280c. PMID 23464873. Wikidata Q38086925.
- Kin Fai Mak; Keliang He; Jie Shan; Heinz, Tony Frederick (2012). "Control of valley polarization in monolayer MoS2 by optical helicity". Nature Nanotechnology. 7 (8): 494–498. arXiv:1205.1822. doi:10.1038/nnano.2012.96. PMID 22706698. Wikidata Q34282213.

== Personal life ==
Shan runs a joint research group with her husband Kin Fai Mak.
