= Heinz Staab =

German chemist (1926–2012)

Heinz A. Staab (26 March 1926 – 29 July 2012) was a German chemist. From 1990 to 1996 he was Präsident der Max Planck Society.

== Biography ==
Staab was born in 1926 in Darmstadt. He studied chemistry at the Marburg, the Tübingen and medicine in Heidelberg. Hans Meerwein, Rolf Huisgen, Adolf Butenandt and Georg Wittig were among his academic teachers. In 1962 he was appointed professor for organic chemistry at the Ruprecht-Karls-Universität Heidelberg. Staab worked in the field of heterocyclic chemistry. Staab was the president of the German Chemical Society (GDCh) from 1984 till 1985. He was director of the Max Planck Society from 1984 until 1990. From 1990 to 1996 he was Präsident der Max Planck Society.

Staab died on 29 July 2012 at the age of 86 in Berlin.

== Awards ==
In 1979 Staab received the Adolf von Baeyer Prize from the German Chemical Society. He has been awarded honorary professorship by the Indian Institute of Science and Academia Sinica. In 1996 he was awarded the Harnack Medal.

Preceded by Reimar Lüst	Director of Max Planck Society; 1984–1990	Succeeded by Hans F. Zacher
