= Max Planck Institute of Experimental Endocrinology =

Former site of Max Planck Society of Hanover, Germany

Coordinates: 52°23′14″N 9°48′5″E

The Max Planck Institute of Experimental Endocrinology, located in Hannover, Germany, was one of 80 institutes in the Max Planck Society (Max-Planck-Gesellschaft). It was founded 1979 to supersede the Max Planck Institute of Cell Biology in Wilhelmshaven. Molecular developmental biology and neuroendocrinology were the two research areas of the institute. The institute was closed 2006 and parts of its research activities were moved to the Max Planck Institute for Biophysical Chemistry in Göttingen.
