= Peter Gruss =

German biologist (born 1949)

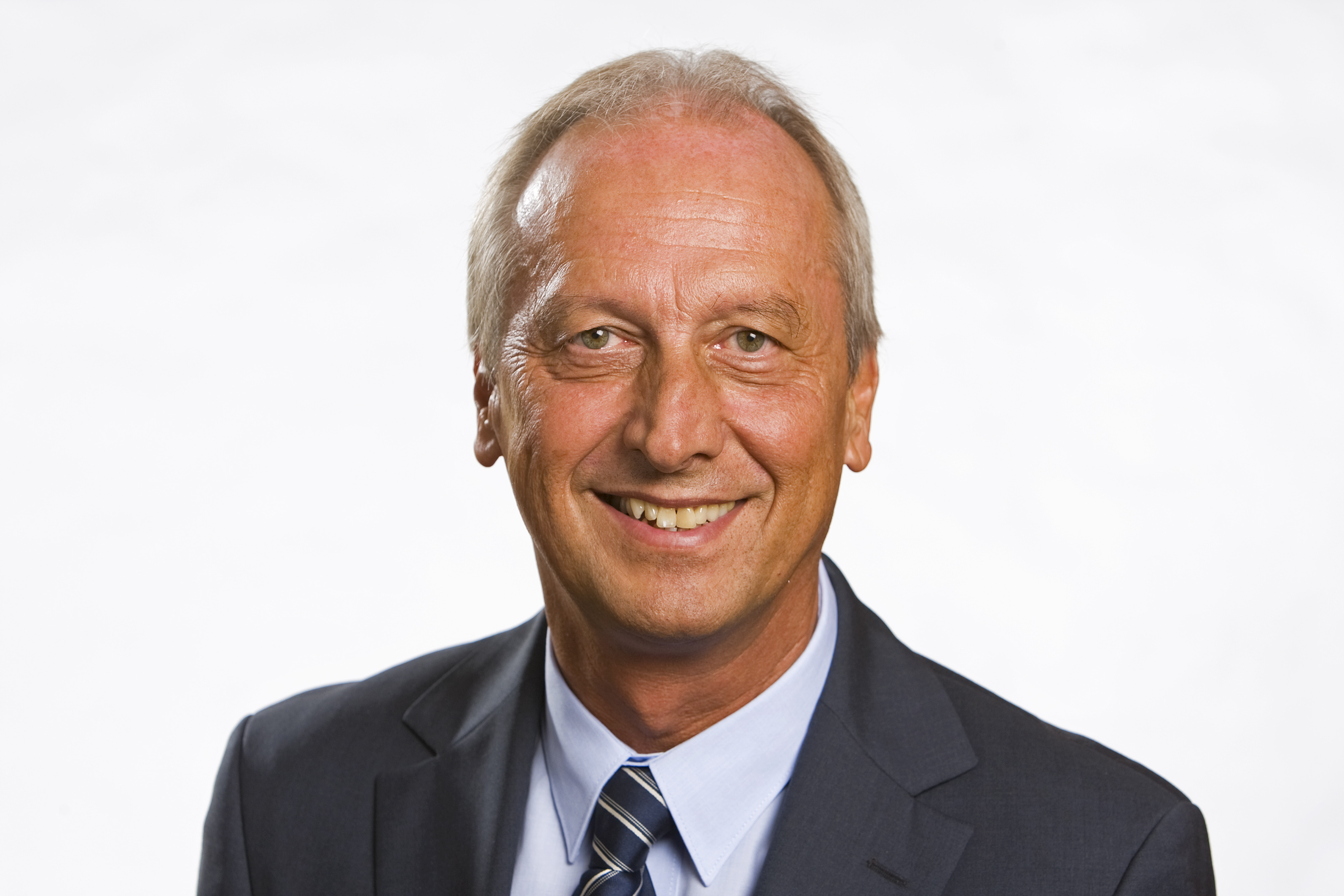
- Born: 28 June 1949 (age 77); Alsfeld, West Germany (now Germany)
- Education: Technische Universität Darmstadt
- Awards: Louis-Jeantet Prize for Medicine (1995)
- Scientific career
- Fields: Developmental Biology
- Workplaces: Max Planck Institute for Biophysical Chemistry; Max Planck Society; Okinawa Institute of Science and Technology
- Website: www.oist.jp/message-president

Peter Gruss (born 28 June 1949) is a German developmental biologist, president of the Okinawa Institute of Science and Technology, and the former president of the Max-Planck-Gesellschaft (having been elected for the term from 2002 to 2008 and reelected for 2008–2014).

Gruss's research has generally covered the topic of control mechanisms in the development of mammals, especially in the development of the nervous system. He has been able to produce insulin using stem cells.

== Biography ==
Gruss grew up in the town of Alsfeld in the German state of Hesse. After gaining his university-entrance qualification (Abitur), he embarked on a degree in biology at Darmstadt University of Technology in 1968, graduating from the Institute of Microbiology in 1973. From 1974 to 1977, Peter Gruss worked on his Ph.D. on the subject of a tumor virus at the Institute for Virus Research at the German Cancer Research Center (DKFZ) in Heidelberg. He then spent a year as an assistant at the German Cancer Research Center. In 1978, he went to the US as a post doc in receipt of a fellowship grant to continue studying tumor viruses at the Cancer Institute of the National Institutes of Health (NIH) in Bethesda/Maryland.

From 1982 to 1986, Gruss was a professor at the University of Heidelberg's Institute of Microbiology. He was on the board of directors of the university's molecular biology institute, the ZMBH, from 1983. During this time, he organised several international molecular biology symposia. In 1986, Gruss was appointed a scientific member and director of the Department of Molecular Cell Biology at the Max Planck Institute for Biophysical Chemistry in Göttingen.

He is honorary professor at University of Göttingen. He is a member of the board at Deutsche Venture Capital, and chairman of DeveloGen.

In early 2015, Gruss has begun to develop the "Siemens Technology & Innovation Council" (STIC), which is an advisory board intended discuss technologies and innovations that will play a significant role for Siemens over the next ten years and beyond. Gruss chairs the council and decides on its orientation.

== Scientific focus ==
Gruss's work focused on gene regulation processes. He was particularly interested in the genetic and cellular-biological building blocks that switch genetic programmes on and off in tumour viruses and in the course of embryonic development. In experiments on mice, he successfully identified significant controlling genes (known as Pax genes) which regulate the development of various organs. A study of the pancreas which he conducted enabled him to detect genes involved in the development of insulin-producing islets of Langerhans. This also provided the basis for differentiating stem cells in insulin-producing cells.

== Work as president of the Max Planck Society ==
Upon taking office, Gruss was regarded by the press as an "American-style man of action" and an "unassuming high flyer".

In his inaugural speech, Gruss focused on the financial scope for science: he called for the introduction of a collective bargaining law specifically for the field of science to enable Germany to attract the world's best scientists. He also spoke out in favour of a reliable financial framework: "Only adequate rates of increase – predefined for a lengthy period of time – for the budget of the MPS can guarantee planning security". The institutes were faced with potentially having to make cuts in their budgets after the Society's budget had not been raised as much as requested in past years.

Gruss pointed out on numerous occasions that the appointment of directors at the Max Planck Society involved competing with some of the world's leading research institutions: "Yet we at Max Planck are not competing with the average – we are competing with the Harvards, the Cambridges and ETH Zurichs of this world". He went on to say that Germany was not internationally competitive when it came to pay, but that the Max Planck Society was largely able to offset this disadvantage due to the support it enjoyed from the Max Planck Foundation and thanks to its world-renowned planning security. A first step towards improving the financial conditions for top scientists from overseas was the Freedom of Science Initiative of the German Government, which has offered non-university research institutions new financial freedoms since 2009.

During Gruss's term in office, numerous institutes were reorganised or newly established: The MPI for Research on Collective Goods and the MPI for Ornithology had their status raised from research group to institute; the MPI for History was reorganised to become the MPI for the Study of Religious and Ethnic Diversity, while the MPI for Biology of Ageing and the MPI for the Science of Light were newly established. The Max Planck Florida Institute marks the first institute of the Max Planck Society to be established outside of Europe; it is funded by the State of Florida and the local county. Furthermore, the MPI for Metals Research was converted to the MPI for Intelligent Systems and a sub-section of the institute was newly established at Tübingen.

The Lead Discovery Center was founded as a new subsidiary in Dortmund in 2008 to improve the technology transfer of newly developed pharmaceutical drugs.

The Society's international networking is particularly successful: After the publication of news on the foundation of the Florida Institute, which came to be seen as a "model", the German news magazine Der Spiegel reported that the MPS had received requests from Canada and South Korea to establish institutes there. More than 40 per cent of the recently appointed Directors at the MPS are from outside of Germany, and 25 per cent of all Directors in the Max Planck Society are of non-German origin.

In an interview published by Spiegel Online, Gruss outlined a new strategy for establishing "Max Planck Centers" for cooperating with foreign research institutions; some of these are already in place in cities like Shanghai, Buenos Aires and New Delhi.

== Technology transfer ==
Gruss championed the cause of transferring his findings into practical application: he co-funded the biopharmaceutical company DeveloGen AG in Göttingen (now part of Evotec) in 1997, together with fellow developmental biologists Herbert Jaeckle (Max Planck Society), Wolfgang Driever (University of Freiburg) and the entrepreneur Herbert Stadler. The company concentrated on developing new treatments for metabolic and endocrinological diseases with a special focus on diabetes.

== Awards and distinctions ==
Gruss has won various awards for his research. In 1994 he was awarded the most highly endowed prize in German science, the Gottfried Wilhelm Leibniz Prize of the Deutsche Forschungsgemeinschaft. In 1995 he received the prestigious Louis-Jeantet Prize for Medicine. In 1999, he was honored with the German Future Prize (the Federal President's Prize for Science and Technology) for his studies in molecular biology and the potential development of therapeutic procedures which they enabled. He received this prize together with Herbert Jäckle. Gruss received the Officer's Cross of the Order of Merit of the Federal Republic of Germany in 2009.

- The Order of the Rising Sun, Gold and Silver Star (2023)

Some of his other awards are

- 1992 Feldberg Prize
- 1995 Louis-Jeantet Prize for Medicine
- 1999 Science Prize of the Donors' Association for the Promotion of Science and Humanities in Germany
- 2004 Lower Saxony State Prize
- 2017 Harnack Medal of the Max Planck Society

== Memberships ==
Gruss is a member of various national and international research committees, among others:

- American Academy of Arts and Sciences
- Since 1996: Göttingen Academy of Sciences
- Since 1995: German National Academy of Sciences Leopoldina
- 1993–1997: President of the International Society of Developmental Biology

Other organisations of which he is a member are:

- 2000–2002: President of the EMBL-Council (and German delegate from 1992 to 2000)
- 2003: Steering Committee of the "National Genome Research Network" of the Federal Ministry of Education and Research
- 2006–2008: "Council for Innovation and Growth" of the Federal Government

Non-profit organization positions
Preceded by Hubert Markl	President of Max Planck Society; 2002—2014	Succeeded by Martin Stratmann
