= Nina Rohringer =

German physicist

Nina Rohringer is an Austrian physicist whose research concerns ultra-fast pulses from free-electron X-ray lasers, and their interactions with matter. She is a lead scientist at DESY, a professor at the University of Hamburg, and a faculty member of the Max Planck Institute for the Structure and Dynamics of Matter, in Germany.

== Education and career ==
Rohringer earned a diploma at TU Wien, in Vienna, in 2000. She continued there for a PhD, completed in 2005. Her dissertation was Quantitative test of time-dependent density functional theory: Two-electron systems in an external laser field.

After postdoctoral research in the US at the Argonne National Laboratory and Lawrence Livermore National Laboratory, and continued work as a research scientist at Lawrence Livermore, she became a group leader in the Max Planck Institute for the Physics of Complex Systems in Dresden in 2011, also affiliated with the DESY Center for Free-Electron Laser Science in Hamburg.

After a 2015 reorganization, her group became part of the Max Planck Institute for the Structure and Dynamics of Matter. Since 2017 she has been a leading scientist at DESY and a professor at the University of Hamburg. At the University of Hamburg, she is research group leader for Theory of ultrafast processes with X-ray light in the Institute for Theoretical Physics and Faculty of Mathematics, Informatics and Natural Sciences. As well, she continues to hold an affiliation as former group leader and faculty member in the Max Planck Institute for the Structure and Dynamics of Matter.

== Research ==
It was during Rohringer's postdoctoral research at Argonne that her research focus shifted from density functional theory to X-ray atomic physics. While at Lawrence Livermore, she used the nearby Linac Coherent Light Source at the SLAC National Accelerator Laboratory to energize high-pressure neon to lase, creating the first atomic X-ray laser, with a much more sharply defined frequency range than free-electron lasers.

More recently her research with the European XFEL has used X-ray pulses to explore ionization in warm dense matter.

== Recognition ==
Rohringer was named as a Fellow of the American Physical Society (APS) in 2023, after a nomination from the APS Division of Atomic, Molecular and Optical Physics, "for outstanding theoretical concepts in the new field of non-linear X-ray science and experiments at X-ray free electron lasers".
