= Ángel Rubio (physicist) =

Spanish theoretical physicist and director

Ángel Rubio Secades (born 27 September 1965 in Oviedo) is a Spanish theoretical physicist and director at the Max Planck Institute for the Structure and Dynamics of Matter in Hamburg. Rubio is also a Distinguished Research Scientist in computational quantum physics at the Simons Foundation's Flatiron Institute in New York City. He is a member of the National Academy of Sciences and a fellow of the American Physical Society.

== Life ==
Rubio studied physics at the University of Valladolid, which awarded him a licenciatura in 1988 and a doctorate in 1991. After working as an assistant professor (Profesor Titular Interino de Universidad) at Valladolid for a year, he went to the University of California at Berkeley as a postdoctoral fellow in October 1992, where he remained until 1994. He then returned to Valladolid as an Assistant Professor (Profesor Titular de Universidad). In 2001, he moved to the University of the Basque Country in San Sebastián, where he has held a professorship since April 2001 and leads a research group on nano-bio-spectroscopy.

Rubio's research stays abroad as a visiting professor have included stints at the Laboratoire des Solides Irradiés of the École polytechnique in Palaiseau (2000-2001), the Free University of Berlin (2005 as well as 2006-2007), the University of Montpellier II (2007), and the University of California at Berkeley in 2014.

At the Fritz Haber Institute of the Max Planck Society in Berlin, Rubio was a Distinguished Visiting Scientist from 2009 to 2011. In November 2011, he became an external scientific member and leader of the Theoretical Spectroscopy group.

In November 2014, Rubio became the Director and Head of the Theory Department at the Max Planck Institute for Structure and Dynamics of Matter in Hamburg, Germany. Since June 2016, he has been a professor at the University of Hamburg. In 2017, he became a Distinguished Research Scientist at the Center for Computational Quantum Physics at the Flatiron Institute research division of the Simons Foundation in New York City.

== Research ==
Rubio's research concerns theoretical solid-state physics, in particular the theory and modeling of the properties of solids and nanostructures, with a focus on Carbon nanotubes, nanowires, and particularly semiconductor clusters under the influence of electromagnetic fields.

Rubio and his collaborators work using numerical methods. Areas of work include developments in many-particle theory and time-dependent density functional theory, including ab-initio descriptions of electronic excitations, optical spectroscopy and ultrafast spectroscopy, scanning tunneling microscopy and spectroscopy, and X-ray absorption spectroscopy, as well as the characterization of the electronic and optical properties of nanostructures.

He is acknowledged as a pioneer and leader in the area of computational materials physics and one of the founders of modern "theoretical spectroscopy". He is also the originator of the widely used ab initio open-source project "Octopus." He pioneered the development of "quantum electrodynamical density functional theory," focusing on the prediction and characterization of new non-equilibrium states of matter and the modeling of strong light–matter interaction phenomena in materials, nanostructures and molecules.

== Honors and awards ==
- 2021: Fellow of the European Physical Society, EU
- 2020: Fellow of the European Academy of Sciences, EU
- 2018: Max Born Medal and Prize, Germany / UK
- 2016: Election to the Academia Europaea, EU
- 2016 Medal of the Real Sociedad Española de Física, Spain
- 2014: Election to the National Academy of Sciences, US
- 2014 Premio Rey Jaime I de Investigación Básica, Spain
- 2014 Foreign Associate Member of the National Academy of Sciences, US
- 2014 Miller Visiting Professor, University of California at Berkeley, US
- 2010: Fellow of the American Association for the Advancement of Science, US
- 2006: XVI Dupont Prize in Nanotechnology, Spain
- 2005: Friedrich Wilhelm Bessel Research Award (Alexander von Humboldt Foundation), Germany
- 2004:Fellow of the American Physical Society (APS), USA
- 2004: Sir Allan Sewell Fellow, Griffith University, Australia

== Publications ==
Rubio is the author of more than 540 papers in peer-reviewed journals. He has been the co-editor of several conference proceedings and textbooks. As of 2023, he has a Google Scholar h-index of 135 and of 99 on Web of Science.
