= Tony Heinz =

American physicist

Tony Frederick Heinz
- Born: April 30, 1956; Palo Alto
- Known for: Nanoscience, two-dimensional materials, laser physics
- Scientific career
- Institutions: Stanford University, Columbia University, IBM - Thomas J. Watson Research Center
- Thesis: Nonlinear optics of surfaces and absorbates (1982)
- Website: Stanford profile

Tony Frederick Heinz (born 30 April 1956 in Palo Alto) is an American physicist.

== Biography ==
Heinz studied at Stanford University, earning a bachelor's degree in 1978. He received his doctorate in 1982 at the University of California, Berkeley, in physics. From 1983 to 1995 he was at the Thomas J. Watson Research Center of IBM. He was a professor at Columbia University and is now a professor at Stanford University. He served as president of The Optical Society in 2021.

== Research ==
His research focuses on ultrafast laser spectroscopy (femtosecond pulses) and thus investigates dynamics at surfaces. His group investigates electronic and optical properties of a few atoms of thin two-dimensional systems (such as graphene or ultrathin crystals of transition-metal di-chalcogen compounds). His significant contributions to the condensed matter and materials physics includes discovery of room temperature excitons in 1D and 2D materials.

Heinz is one of the most cited scientists. Since 2019, the media group Clarivate counts him among the favorites for a Nobel Prize (Clarivate Citation Laureates).

== Awards and honors ==
- 2026 Frederic Ives Medal/Jarus W. Quinn Prize from The Optical Society "for pioneering discoveries in photon science, outstanding leadership, and a deep commitment to education"
- Member of the National Academy of Sciences (since 2024)
- 2020 William F. Meggers Award from The Optical Society "For seminal studies of the properties and dynamics of surfaces, interfaces, and nanoscale materials by diverse spectroscopic techniques, including through the development of powerful new methods."
- 2008 he earned the Julius Springer Prize for Applied Physics.
- 1996 he earned the Humboldt Prize.
- Fellow of the American Physical Society.
- Fellow of The Optical Society.

== Selected publications ==
- Wang, Feng; Dukovic, Gordana; Brus, Louis E.; Heinz, Tony F. (2005). "The Optical Resonances in Carbon Nanotubes Arise from Excitons". Science. 308 (5723): 838–841. Bibcode:2005Sci...308..838W. doi:10.1126/science.1110265. ISSN 0036-8075. PMID 15879212. S2CID 11778836.
- Mak, Kin Fai; Sfeir, Matthew Y.; Wu, Yang; Lui, Chun Hung; Misewich, James A.; Heinz, Tony F. (2008). "Measurement of the Optical Conductivity of Graphene". Physical Review Letters. 101 (19) 196405. arXiv:0810.1269. Bibcode:2008PhRvL.101s6405M. doi:10.1103/PhysRevLett.101.196405. PMID 19113291. S2CID 6050585.
- Mak, Kin Fai; Lee, Changgu; Hone, James; Shan, Jie; Heinz, Tony F. (2010). "Atomically Thin MoS_{2} A New Direct-Gap Semiconductor". Physical Review Letters. 105 (13) 136805. arXiv:1004.0546. Bibcode:2010PhRvL.105m6805M. doi:10.1103/PhysRevLett.105.136805. PMID 21230799. S2CID 40589037.
- Lee, Changgu; Yan, Hugen; Brus, Louis E.; Heinz, Tony F.; Hone, James; Ryu, Sunmin (2010). "Anomalous Lattice Vibrations of Single- and Few-Layer MoS_{2}". ACS Nano. 4 (5): 2695–2700. arXiv:1005.2509. doi:10.1021/nn1003937. ISSN 1936-0851. PMID 20392077. S2CID 6543876.
- Mak, Kin Fai; He, Keliang; Shan, Jie; Heinz, Tony F. (2012). "Control of valley polarization in monolayer MoS_{2} by optical helicity". Nature Nanotechnology. 7 (8): 494–498. arXiv:1205.1822. Bibcode:2012NatNa...7..494M. doi:10.1038/nnano.2012.96. ISSN 1748-3395. PMID 22706698. S2CID 23248686.
- Butler, Sheneve Z.; Hollen, Shawna M.; Cao, Linyou; Cui, Yi; Gupta, Jay A.; Gutiérrez, Humberto R.; Heinz, Tony F.; Hong, Seung Sae; Huang, Jiaxing; Ismach, Ariel F.; Johnston-Halperin, Ezekiel (2013). "Progress, Challenges, and Opportunities in Two-Dimensional Materials Beyond Graphene". ACS Nano. 7 (4): 2898–2926. doi:10.1021/nn400280c. ISSN 1936-0851. PMID 23464873.
- Mak, Kin Fai; He, Keliang; Lee, Changgu; Lee, Gwan Hyoung; Hone, James; Heinz, Tony F.; Shan, Jie (2013). "Tightly bound trions in monolayer MoS_{2}". Nature Materials. 12 (3): 207–211. arXiv:1210.8226. Bibcode:2013NatMa..12..207M. doi:10.1038/nmat3505. ISSN 1476-4660. PMID 23202371. S2CID 205408065.
- van der Zande, Arend M.; Huang, Pinshane Y.; Chenet, Daniel A.; Berkelbach, Timothy C.; You, YuMeng; Lee, Gwan-Hyoung; Heinz, Tony F.; Reichman, David R.; Muller, David A.; Hone, James C. (2013). "Grains and grain boundaries in highly crystalline monolayer molybdenum disulphide". Nature Materials. 12 (6): 554–561. arXiv:1301.1985. Bibcode:2013NatMa..12..554V. doi:10.1038/nmat3633. ISSN 1476-4660. PMID 23644523. S2CID 36712829.
- Xu, Xiaodong; Yao, Wang; Xiao, Di; Heinz, Tony F. (2014). "Spin and pseudospins in layered transition metal dichalcogenides". Nature Physics. 10 (5): 343–350. Bibcode:2014NatPh..10..343X. doi:10.1038/nphys2942. ISSN 1745-2481. S2CID 85510443.
- Lee, Chul-Ho; Lee, Gwan-Hyoung; van der Zande, Arend M.; Chen, Wenchao; Li, Yilei; Han, Minyong; Cui, Xu; Arefe, Ghidewon; Nuckolls, Colin; Heinz, Tony F.; Guo, Jing (2014). "Atomically thin p–n junctions with van der Waals heterointerfaces". Nature Nanotechnology. 9 (9): 676–681. arXiv:1403.3062. Bibcode:2014NatNa...9..676L. doi:10.1038/nnano.2014.150. ISSN 1748-3395. PMID 25108809. S2CID 9066135.
