= International Max Planck Research School for Ultrafast Imaging and Structural Dynamics =

The International Max Planck Research School for Ultrafast Imaging and Structural Dynamics (IMPRS-UFAST) is a graduate school of the Max Planck Society. It is a joint venture of the Max Planck Institute for the Structure and Dynamics of Matter (MPSD), the University of Hamburg, the Center for Free Electron Laser Science, the Deutsches Elektronen Synchrotron (DESY), and the European XFEL GmbH. It was established in 2011 and is now based at the Max Planck Institute for the Structure and Dynamics of Matter in Hamburg, Germany.

The school offers an interdisciplinary PhD programme focussing generally on research on structural changes of atoms, molecules, condensed, biological, or warm dense matter at femtosecond time scales, with the ultimate goal of discovering the primary events governing these processes. Research areas include the theoretical and practical aspects of condensed matter and atomically resolved dynamics, fundamental light–matter interaction, accelerator-based light sources, coherent imaging, coherent controlled molecular and solid state dynamics, molecule imaging, extreme timescale spectroscopy, ultrafast optics, free-electron lasers and x-ray, and their applications in chemistry, biology and medicine.

The programme builds on the infrastructures and scientific expertise in the area of advanced light sources available in the Hamburg area. The program takes in approximately 10 students annually, who are fully funded for the duration of their doctoral studies.
