= Non-linear phononics =

Nonlinear phononics is the study of nonlinear dynamics of phonons in solids, particularly the control of crystal structures and material properties through large-amplitude coherent lattice vibrations. At sufficiently large vibrational amplitudes, anharmonic terms in the interatomic potential couple different normal modes. Resonant excitation of infrared-active optical phonons with intense terahertz or mid-infrared pulses can thereby induce displacements along other lattice coordinates, including Raman-active modes.

Through coupling between lattice vibrations and electronic degrees of freedom, these coherent structural distortions can modify electronic states and collective phenomena such as magnetism, ferroelectricity, and superconductivity. Because the excitation directly targets lattice vibrations, typically with photon energies of roughly 10 to 100 millielectronvolts (frequencies of a few to about 25 terahertz), nonlinear phononics provides a route to manipulating material properties without requiring direct excitation across electronic transitions.

== History ==
The excitation of Raman-active phonons through anharmonic coupling to resonantly driven infrared-active phonons, termed the ionic Raman effect, was analysed theoretically around 1970 as a lattice-mediated alternative to Raman processes that act through the electronic system. Its experimental demonstration required intense, tunable mid-infrared femtosecond sources. In 2011, Först and coworkers resonantly drove an infrared-active stretching mode of the manganite La_{0.7}Sr_{0.3}MnO_{3} and detected coherent oscillations of a Raman-active mode in the time-resolved reflectivity, which they attributed to ionic Raman scattering and described as nonlinear phononics. Femtosecond X-ray diffraction measurements on the same material were subsequently interpreted in terms of a displacive lattice response.

== Physical principles ==
=== Harmonic and anharmonic lattice dynamics ===
In the harmonic approximation, lattice vibrations are described by independent normal modes. In mass-weighted normal coordinates $Q_i$, the potential energy is

$$V_{\mathrm{harm}}=\frac{1}{2}\sum_i\Omega_i^2Q_i^2,$$

where $\Omega_i$ is the angular frequency of mode $i$. At larger amplitudes, the potential includes higher-order terms:

$$V=\frac12\sum_i\Omega_i^2Q_i^2+\frac{1}{3!}\sum_{ijk}\Phi_{ijk}Q_iQ_jQ_k+\frac{1}{4!}\sum_{ijkl}\Phi_{ijkl}Q_iQ_jQ_kQ_l+\cdots.$$

The cubic and quartic coefficients describe interactions between lattice modes and can cause mode coupling, frequency shifts, and changes in equilibrium atomic positions.

=== Nonlinear ionic Raman scattering ===
A widely studied mechanism couples an infrared-active mode $Q_{\mathrm{IR}}$ to a Raman-active mode $Q_{\mathrm R}$ through a cubic interaction:

$$V=\frac12\Omega_{\mathrm{IR}}^2Q_{\mathrm{IR}}^2+\frac12\Omega_{\mathrm R}^2Q_{\mathrm R}^2+gQ_{\mathrm{IR}}^2Q_{\mathrm R}.$$

The infrared-active mode is driven by an electric field $E(t)$. In a simplified classical description, the coupled equations of motion are

$$\ddot Q_{\mathrm{IR}}+2\gamma_{\mathrm{IR}}\dot Q_{\mathrm{IR}}+\Omega_{\mathrm{IR}}^2Q_{\mathrm{IR}}=Z_{\mathrm{IR}}E(t)-2gQ_{\mathrm{IR}}Q_{\mathrm R},$$

$$\ddot Q_{\mathrm R}+2\gamma_{\mathrm R}\dot Q_{\mathrm R}+\Omega_{\mathrm R}^2Q_{\mathrm R}=-gQ_{\mathrm{IR}}^2.$$

Here $\gamma$ denotes damping and $Z_{\mathrm{IR}}$ is the mode effective charge in the chosen normal-coordinate convention. The Raman-active mode experiences the force $F_{\mathrm R}=-gQ_{\mathrm{IR}}^2$. If $Q_{\mathrm{IR}}=A\cos(\Omega_{\mathrm{IR}}t)$, then

$$F_{\mathrm R}(t)=-\frac{gA^2}{2}[1+\cos(2\Omega_{\mathrm{IR}}t)].$$

The force contains a constant (rectified) component, in analogy to optical rectification in nonlinear optics, whose sign is set by the sign of $g$ and is independent of the phase of the infrared oscillation. Averaged over the fast oscillation, the Raman coordinate is displaced to $\Delta Q_{\mathrm R}=-gA^2/(2\Omega_{\mathrm R}^2)$; the component at $2\Omega_{\mathrm{IR}}$ adds only a small oscillation when $\Omega_{\mathrm R}\ll2\Omega_{\mathrm{IR}}$. For pulsed excitation, the response depends on how long the infrared mode rings compared with the Raman period. If it persists for longer, the Raman coordinate oscillates about, and relaxes toward, a displaced position; if it decays within a fraction of a Raman period, the rectified force acts as an impulse that launches coherent oscillations about the original equilibrium.

This mechanism differs from impulsive stimulated Raman scattering and other coherent-phonon generation mechanisms that act through electronic excitation or the electronic polarizability: here the force on the Raman-active mode arises from lattice anharmonicity, which allows the lattice to be controlled while the electronic system remains in its ground state.

=== Sum-frequency excitation ===
Raman-active modes can also be driven at the sum frequency of two driving components. In terahertz sum-frequency excitation, two frequency components of an intense terahertz pulse combine to drive a Raman-active phonon at their sum frequency; this was demonstrated for the 40 THz optical phonon of diamond using a pulse centred at half that frequency. Unlike the rectified force of ionic Raman scattering, this process transfers the carrier-envelope phase of the driving pulse to the lattice vibration. An ionic counterpart, in which the sum frequency of driven infrared-active phonons is resonant with a Raman-active mode, has been proposed theoretically.

=== Symmetry and other anharmonic couplings ===
Anharmonic interactions must respect the symmetry of the crystal: a coupling term is allowed only if the product of the representations of the participating modes contains the totally symmetric representation. For a nondegenerate infrared-active mode, $Q_{\mathrm{IR}}^2$ is always totally symmetric, so the $Q_{\mathrm{IR}}^2Q_{\mathrm R}$ term displaces the lattice only along fully symmetric Raman coordinates and preserves the crystal symmetry. In centrosymmetric crystals, infrared-active modes are odd and Raman-active modes even under inversion, so cubic terms odd in $Q_{\mathrm{IR}}$ vanish and $Q_{\mathrm{IR}}^2Q_{\mathrm R}$ is the leading cubic coupling.

Symmetry-lowering distortions become accessible when two components of a degenerate infrared-active mode, or two distinct infrared-active modes, are driven simultaneously through terms of the form $Q_{\mathrm{IR},a}Q_{\mathrm{IR},b}Q_{\mathrm R}$. In La_{0.7}Sr_{0.3}MnO_{3}, for example, driving a doubly degenerate E_{u} mode excited a Raman-active E_{g} mode. When two orthogonal infrared-active modes are driven, the direction of the resulting distortion can be selected by the polarization of the driving field.

Quartic interactions can also modify lattice stability. For example, a term $g_4Q_{\mathrm{IR}}^2Q_{\mathrm R}^2$ changes the instantaneous effective squared frequency of the Raman coordinate to $\Omega_{\mathrm R,eff}^2=\Omega_{\mathrm R}^2+2g_4Q_{\mathrm{IR}}^2$. Depending on the coupling sign, excitation may harden or soften that mode. These mechanisms complement displacive excitation and can contribute to light-induced structural changes.

== Experimental methods ==
Nonlinear phononics is often investigated by resonantly exciting infrared-active optical phonons with intense terahertz or mid-infrared laser pulses. The resulting atomic motion can be measured with time-resolved X-ray diffraction, ultrafast electron diffraction, and optical spectroscopies such as time-resolved reflectivity, in which coherently excited Raman-active modes appear as oscillations of the signal. Changes in diffraction intensities can reveal transient atomic displacements and changes in structural order parameters. Symmetry changes, such as the loss of inversion symmetry in light-induced polar states, are commonly detected with time-resolved second-harmonic generation.

Experiments have observed displacive lattice excitation associated with resonant infrared phonon driving. Strong-field measurements have also been used to investigate the shape of the anharmonic interatomic potential beyond the small-amplitude regime.

== Applications and research directions ==
=== Structural and ferroelectric control ===
The coupling between coherently excited phonons and other lattice coordinates can transiently modify bond lengths, bond angles, and structural order parameters. In ferroelectrics, large-amplitude driving of a high-frequency polar mode exerts a unidirectional force along the ferroelectric mode through a coupling of the form $Q_{\mathrm P}Q_{\mathrm{IR}}^2$, which was predicted to enable ultrafast polarization switching. Transient reversal of the polarization was subsequently observed in LiNbO_{3} with phase-sensitive second-harmonic generation, and could be induced in both directions.

Experiments on strontium titanate reported a metastable polar phase following optical excitation of lattice vibrations, persisting for hours after the excitation and observed up to about room temperature. Resonant driving of the soft mode with intense terahertz fields has also been reported to induce a transient ferroelectric phase in the same material. The mechanisms of such light-induced polar states, and their dependence on material and excitation conditions, remain under investigation.

Nonlinear phonon driving can also control other structural symmetries. Optical switching of ferroaxial order was proposed theoretically, and in RbFe(MoO_{4})_{2} circularly driven phonons have been used to reversibly and nonvolatilely switch ferroaxial domains, with the selected state depending on the excitation helicity. The induction of handed structural distortions in initially achiral crystals through phonon driving has been studied theoretically, and light-induced chirality has been reported experimentally in boron phosphate, with the handedness selected by the pump polarization.

=== Magnetic and electronic properties ===
Lattice distortions can modify magnetic exchange pathways, crystal fields, and spin–lattice coupling, which has motivated phonon-mediated control of magnetism, sometimes termed magnetophononics. Driving pairs of orthogonal infrared-active phonons in ErFeO_{3} with a controlled relative phase produced rotational motion of the crystal-field ions that acted as an effective magnetic field and excited spin precession. Resonant phonon excitation has also been used to switch between antiferromagnetic and weakly ferromagnetic order in DyFeO_{3} by modifying the exchange interaction between rare-earth and transition-metal ions, and to switch the magnetization of magnetic garnet films through a magnetoelastic mechanism.

In correlated electron materials, driven lattice distortions can also change electronic bandwidths and interactions; this has been investigated in particular in connection with light-induced superconducting-like states (see below).

The concept of dynamical multiferroicity describes magnetic moments generated by time-dependent electric polarization. Circular or elliptical ionic motion carries phonon angular momentum and can produce a dynamical magnetization. Experimental evidence for this effect was reported in SrTiO_{3}, where circularly polarized terahertz pulses resonant with the soft mode produced a magneto-optical Kerr signal at room temperature. Theoretical work has also explored simultaneous phonon-induced polarization and magnetization.

=== Light-induced superconducting-like states ===
Resonant excitation of lattice vibrations has been investigated as a route to modifying superconducting properties in materials outside their equilibrium superconducting phase. In underdoped YBa_{2}Cu_{3}O_{6+x}, mid-infrared excitation of apical-oxygen vibrations produces transient optical responses resembling coherent interlayer transport, including at temperatures far above the equilibrium critical temperature. Time-resolved X-ray diffraction and first-principles calculations revealed that the driven lattice undergoes changes in copper–oxygen bond geometry and the spacing within and between CuO_{2} bilayers. These distortions modify the electronic structure and were proposed as one possible contribution to the superconducting-like response. Later measurements of the magnetic field near an optically driven YBa_{2}Cu_{3}O_{6.48} crystal, using Faraday rotation in an adjacent magneto-optic material, reported a transient diamagnetic response under the same driving conditions, comparable in size to that expected for an equilibrium type-II superconductor of similar shape and size.

Related experiments on the molecular solid K_{3}C_{60} used mid-infrared pulses resonant with molecular vibrations and observed transient optical signatures, including a suppressed low-frequency dissipative conductivity and an inductive response, resembling those of the equilibrium superconducting state at temperatures above its critical temperature. The authors described the observations as possible light-induced superconductivity, while emphasizing that optical measurements alone cannot unambiguously establish a superconducting phase.

The role of nonlinear phonon coupling in these effects, and whether superconducting-like responses necessarily indicate transient superconductivity, remain subjects of investigation. The interpretation of time-resolved terahertz measurements of rapidly evolving transient states has itself been debated. Structural control through nonlinear phononics is one proposed mechanism rather than a universal explanation for all light-induced superconducting-like phenomena.

== Theoretical and computational approaches ==
Anharmonic coupling coefficients can be estimated from density functional theory by calculating total energies for combinations of frozen-phonon displacements and fitting a multidimensional potential energy surface. The resulting coupled equations of motion can then be solved numerically for a prescribed driving field. Extensions include additional modes, higher-order terms, damping, and coupling to electronic or magnetic degrees of freedom.

== See also ==
- Phonon
- Anharmonicity
- Lattice dynamics
- Coherent phonon
- Raman scattering
- Ultrafast spectroscopy
- Spin–phonon coupling
