= Hans F. Zacher =

Hans Friedrich Zacher (22 June 1928 – 18 February 2015) was a German academician. He was a professor at the Ludwig-Maximilians-Universität München and was the President of the Max Planck Society from 1990 until 1996.

== Biography ==
Zacher was born in Erlach am Inn in Germany and attended school in nearby Simbach. Later he studied law at the University of Bamberg, the University of Erlangen, and the Ludwig-Maximilians-Universität München. He was an ordinary member of the Pontifical Academy of Social Sciences.

== Works ==
- The reestablishment of the parliamentary system after the Second World War. (1952) – doctoral thesis under Hans Nawiasky.
- The constitutional law of the state social intervention. (1962) – Habilitation topic.

== Decorations and awards ==
- 1983 Bavarian Order of Merit
- 1991 Honorary Doctorate from the Catholic University of Leuven
- 1992 Grand Cross of Merit of the Federal Republic of Germany
- 1995 Honorary Doctorate from the University of Wrocław
- 1995 Bavarian Maximilian Order for Science and Art
- 1996 Honorary doctorate from the Weizmann Institute of Science, Rehovot (Israel)
- 1997 Honorary Doctorate from the University of Szeged
- 1998 Harnack Medal of the Max Planck Society
- 2001 Honorary Doctorate, University of Athens
- 2001 Austrian Cross of Honour for Science and Art, 1st class
- 2004 Officer of the National Order of Merit (France)

Preceded by Heinz Staab	President of Max Planck Society; 1990—1996	Succeeded by Hubert Markl
