= International Max Planck Research School for Evolutionary Biology =

The International Max Planck Research School for Evolutionary Biology (IMPRS Evolbio) is an international PhD program in Germany dedicated to research and training in Evolutionary Biology. It is one of the top locations in the area of evolutionary and biological research in Germany. It developed as the result of a joint program between the Max Planck Institute for Evolutionary Biology in Plön, the Christian Albrechts University and the Helmholtz Center for Ocean Research (GEOMAR) in Kiel.

It was founded in 2010 and it is the only IMPRS in the Northern German state of Schleswig-Holstein. The study program includes, among other topics: Experimental Evolution, Molecular Evolution, Behavioral Biology, Evolutionary Theory, Mathematical Modelling and Organism Evolution.

Each year, 10 to 15 students are selected to enroll the program and to join one of the over 30 research groups involved during the three-year graduate education.
