= Hubert Markl =

German biologist (1938–2015)

- Born: Hubert Simon Markl; 17 August 1938; Regensburg, Germany
- Died: 8 January 2015 (aged 76); Konstanz, Germany
- Education: LMU Munich
- Awards: Lorenz Oken Medal (1984); Karl Vossler Prize (1985); Arthur Burkhardt Prize (1989); Karl Winnacker Prize (1991); Bundesverdienstkreuz (1992); Ernst Robert Curtius Prize (1995); ForMemRS (2002)
- Scientific career
- Fields: Biology
- Workplaces: Technical University of Darmstadt; University of Konstanz
- Website: www.uni-konstanz.de/FuF/Bio/forsch/zoology/markl

Hubert Simon Markl (17 August 1938 – 8 January 2015) was a German biologist who also served as president of the Max Planck Society from 1996 to 2002.

== Early life ==
Markl was born on 17 August 1938 in Regensburg, Germany. He studied biology, chemistry and geography at LMU Munich. He completed his Ph.D. in zoology from LMU Munich in 1962. He did research internships at Harvard University and Rockefeller University in 1965–1966. In 1976, he earned his Habilitation (postdoctoral lecturing qualification) in zoology from the Johann Wolfgang Goethe University Frankfurt am Main.

== Academic career and research ==
From 1968 to 1973, Markl worked as full professor and director of the Zoological Institute at the Darmstadt University of Technology. Since 1974, he has been Professor of Biology at the University of Konstanz.

From 1977 to 1983, he was vice president of the Deutsche Forschungsgemeinschaft (DFG) and from 1986 to 1991, he was president of the DFG. In 1993, he became president of the newly founded Berlin-Brandenburg Academy of Sciences and Humanities (Berlin-Brandenburgische Akademie der Wissenschaften). From 1996 to 2002, he was president of the Max Planck Society.

Markl was known for his work on sensory physiology, social behaviour of animals, nature conservation, and environmental protection. He has also published many books.

== Awards and honors ==
Markl has received many awards and honors for his work.

He received the Lorenz Oken Medal from the Society of German Natural Scientists and Doctors in 1984, the Karl Vossler Prize in 1985, the Arthur Burkhardt Prize in 1989, the Karl Winnacker Prize in 1991, and the Ernst Robert Curtius Prize in 1995, the Bundesverdienstkreuz (officially Verdienstorden der Bundesrepublik Deutschland, Order of Merit of the Federal Republic of Germany) in 1992.

He received honorary doctorates from Saarland University in 1992, and the University of Dublin in 1997. He received the Eduard Rhein Ring of Honor from the Eduard Rhein Foundation in 2004.

He was elected to the American Academy of Arts and Sciences in 1985, and the American Philosophical Society in 2000.

He was elected Foreign member of the Royal Society, in 2002. His nomination reads:

Hubert ('Jim') Markl is arguably the most influential figure in European science policy and a key person influencing the relationship between science and society. He has uniquely served as President of the Deutsche Forschungsgemeinschaft and the Max Planck Gesellschaft. In these roles he has been an outstanding and bold advocate for scientific research in Germany and throughout Europe. His astute judgement, cogency and intellectual rigour command the respect of all his peers. Markl has also been a leading spokesperson in Germany on difficult issues at the interface between science and society. He has, for example, been an eloquent advocate of stem cell research, speaking out against the political mainstream. He has also striven to expose fully, and acknowledge, the Max Planck Society's responsibility for atrocities committed by Kaiser Wilhelm Gesellschaft scientists during the Nazi era. His occupancy of the two most senior positions in German science policy, of course, derives from his earlier substantial scientific contributions to the emerging discipline of behavioural ecology, as well as his books on science, society and culture.

Preceded by Hans F. Zacher	President of Max Planck Society; 1996–2002	Succeeded by Peter Gruss
