= List of Johns Hopkins University research centers and institutes =

This is a list of campuses and centers affiliated with Johns Hopkins University.

== Research centers and institutes ==
- Johns Hopkins Hospital
- Applied Physics Laboratory
- Space Telescope Science Institute
- The Berman Institute of Bioethics
- Johns Hopkins Institute for Policy Studies
- Wilmer Ophthalmological Institute

== Other campuses and centers ==
- The Bayview Medical Center
- Howard County General Hospital
- The Bologna Center, Italy
- Hopkins-Nanjing Center for Chinese and American Studies, China
- Singapore Conservatory of Music
- Peabody Institute
- Johns Hopkins All Children's Hospital
