= Max Planck Society =

Association of German research institutes

Max Planck Society for the Advancement of Science
- Max-Planck-Gesellschaft zur Förderung der Wissenschaften
- Logo
- Abbreviation: MPG
- Predecessor: Kaiser Wilhelm Society
- Formation: 1911; 115 years ago
- Type: Non-profit research organization
- Legal status: Eingetragener Verein (e. V.)
- Headquarters: Munich, Germany
- Coordinates: 48°08′28″N 11°34′56″E
- President: Patrick Cramer
- Main organ: Senate
- Budget: €2.1 billion (2023)
- Staff: 25,740 (2024)
- Website: www.mpg.de/en

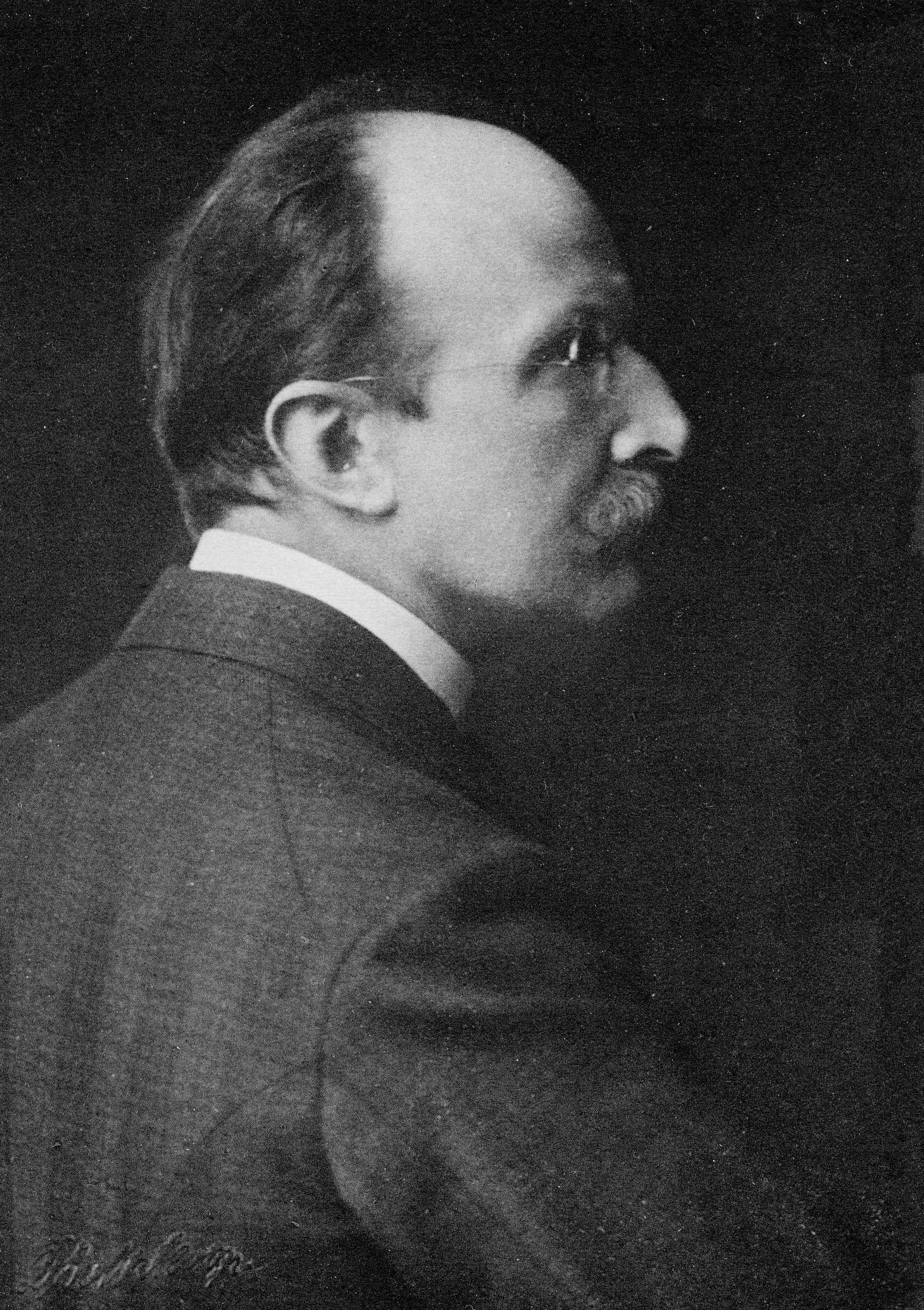
Max Planck, after whom the society is named

The Max Planck Society for the Advancement of Science (German: Max-Planck-Gesellschaft zur Förderung der Wissenschaften e. V.; MPG) is a formally independent non-governmental and nonprofit association of German research institutes. Founded in 1911 as the Kaiser Wilhelm Society, it was renamed to the Max Planck Society in 1948 in honor of its former president, theoretical physicist Max Planck. The society is funded by the federal and state governments of Germany.

== Mission ==
According to its primary goal, the Max Planck Society supports fundamental research in the natural, life and social sciences, the arts and humanities in its 84 (as of January 2024) institutes and research facilities. As of 31 December 2023, the society has a total staff of 24,655 permanent employees, including 6,688 contractually employed scientists, 3,444 doctoral candidates, and 3,203 guest scientists. 44.9% of all employees are female and 57.2% of the scientists are foreign nationals. The society's budget for 2023 was about €2.1 billion.

The Max Planck Society has a world-leading reputation as a science and technology research organization, with 41 Nobel Prizes awarded to their scientists, and is widely regarded as one of the foremost basic research organizations in the world. In 2025, the Nature Index placed the Max Planck Institutes twelfth worldwide in terms of research published in Nature journals. In terms of total research volume (unweighted by citations or impact), the Max Planck Society is only outranked by the Chinese Academy of Sciences, the Russian Academy of Sciences and Harvard University in the Times Higher Education institutional rankings. The Thomson Reuters-Science Watch website placed the Max Planck Society as the second leading research organization worldwide following Harvard University in terms of the impact of the produced research over science fields.

The Max Planck Society and its predecessor Kaiser Wilhelm Society hosted several renowned scientists in their fields, including Otto Hahn, Werner Heisenberg, and Albert Einstein.

The Max Planck Society also hosts the Cornell, Maryland, and Max Planck Pre-Doctoral Research School, an intense week of lectures, informal conversations with guest faculty and fellow students from all over the world, professional development panels with academic and industrial speakers, research poster sessions, and social events.

== History ==
The society's logo features Minerva, the Roman goddess of wisdom.

The organization was established in 1911 as the Kaiser Wilhelm Society, or Kaiser-Wilhelm-Gesellschaft (KWG), a non-governmental research organization named for the then German emperor. The KWG was one of the world's leading research organizations; its board of directors included scientists like Walther Bothe, Peter Debye, Albert Einstein, and Fritz Haber. In 1946, Otto Hahn assumed the position of president of KWG, and in 1948, the society was renamed the Max Planck Society (MPG) after its former president (1930–37) Max Planck, who died in 1947.

The Max Planck Society has a world-leading reputation as a science and technology research organization. In 2006, the Times Higher Education Supplement rankings of non-university research institutions (based on international peer review by academics) placed the Max Planck Society as No.1 in the world for science research, and No.3 in technology research (behind AT&T Corporation and the Argonne National Laboratory in the United States).

The domain mpg.de attracted at least 1.7 million visitors annually by 2008 according to a Compete.com study.

=== List of presidents of the KWG and the MPG ===
1. Adolf von Harnack (1911–1930)
2. Max Planck (1930–1937)
3. Carl Bosch (1937–1940)
4. Albert Vögler (1941–1945)
5. Max Planck (16 May 1945 – 31 March 1946)
6. Otto Hahn (as President of the KWG 1946 and then as Founder and President of the MPG 1948–1960)
7. Adolf Butenandt (1960–1972)
8. Reimar Lüst (1972–1984)
9. Heinz Staab (1984–1990)
10. Hans F. Zacher (1990–1996)
11. Hubert Markl (1996–2002)
12. Peter Gruss (2002–2014)
13. Martin Stratmann (2014–2023)
14. Patrick Cramer (2023–present)

== Max Planck Research Award ==
From 1990 to 2004, the "Max Planck Research Award for International Cooperation" was presented to several researchers from a wide range of disciplines each year.

From 2004 to 2017, the "Max Planck Research Award" was conferred annually to two internationally renowned scientists, one of whom was working in Germany and one in another country. Calls for nominations for the award were invited on an annually rotating basis in specific sub-areas of the natural sciences and engineering, the life sciences, and the human and social sciences. The objective of the Max Planck Society and the Alexander von Humboldt Foundation in presenting this joint research award was to give added momentum to specialist fields that were either not yet established in Germany or that deserved to be expanded.

Since 2018, the award has been succeeded by the "Max Planck-Humboldt Research Award", annually awarded to an internationally renowned mid-career researcher with outstanding future potential from outside Germany but having a strong interest in a research residency in Germany for limited time periods, alternately in the fields of natural and engineering sciences, human sciences, and life sciences, as well as the "Max Planck-Humboldt Medal" awarded to other two finalists.

=== Max Planck-Humboldt Research Awards and Medals ===
Year	Award	Name	Institution	Field
2024	Max Planck-Humboldt Research Award	Geordie Williamson	University of Sydney	Mathematics
2024	Max Planck-Humboldt Medal	Torsten Hoefler	ETH Zurich	Artificial Intelligence and High-Performance Computing with applications in Climate Sciences
2024	Max Planck-Humboldt Medal	Laura Waller	University of California, Berkeley	Computational microscopy
2023	Max Planck-Humboldt Research Award	Rotem Sorek	Weizmann Institute of Science	Bacterial defense mechanisms against viruses
2023	Max Planck-Humboldt Medal	Amy Buck	University of Edinburgh	Inter-species RNA communication
2023	Max Planck-Humboldt Medal	Kandice Tanner	National Cancer Institute, National Institutes of Health in Bethesda	Biophysics of the metastatic spread of cancer
2022	Max Planck-Humboldt Research Award	Margaret Roberts	University of California, San Diego	Censorship and Disinformation
2022	Max Planck-Humboldt Medal	Vanessa Ogle	Yale University	Social Sciences
2022	Max Planck-Humboldt Medal	Wim Decock	Universities of Louvain-la-Neuve and Liége	Social Sciences
2021	Max Planck-Humboldt Research Award	Pablo Jarillo-Herrero	MIT	Quantum Materials
2021	Max Planck-Humboldt Medal	Anastassia Alexandrova	University of California, Los Angeles	Theoretical Chemistry
2021	Max Planck-Humboldt Medal	Sumit Gulwani	Microsoft	AI-assisted Programming
2020	Max Planck-Humboldt Research Award	Roberto Bonasio	University of Pennsylvania	Life sciences
2020	Max Planck-Humboldt Medal	Luciano Marraffini	Rockefeller University	Life sciences
2019	Max Planck-Humboldt Research Award	Ufuk Akcigit	University of Chicago	Macroeconomics
2019	Max Planck-Humboldt Medal	Elliot Tucker-Drob	University of Texas at Austin	Personality and developmental psychology
2018	Max Planck-Humboldt Research Award	Catherine Heymans	University of Edinburgh	Dark energy
2018	Max Planck-Humboldt Medal	Robert Wood	Harvard University	Soft robotics
2018	Max Planck-Humboldt Medal	Sam Payne	University of Texas at Austin	Tropical geometry

=== Max Planck Research Award ===
Year	Name	Institution	Field
2016	Bonnie Bassler	Princeton University	Sensory perception of organisms
2016	Martin Wikelski	Max Planck Institute for Ornithology	Sensory perception of organisms
2015	Bryan Stanley Turner	City University of New York	Religion and modernity – secularisation, social and religious pluralism
2015	Hans Joas	Humboldt University of Berlin	Religion and modernity – secularisation, social and religious pluralism
2014	Robert J. Schoelkopf	Yale University	Quantum nanoscience
2014	Jörg Wrachtrup	University of Stuttgart	Quantum nanoscience
2013	Chris Field	Carnegie Institution for Science & Stanford University	Influence of climate change on ecosystems
2013	Markus Reichstein	Max Planck Institute for Biogeochemistry	Influence of climate change on ecosystems
2012	Katharina Pistor	Columbia University Law School	Regulating international financial markets
2012	Martin Hellwig	Max Planck Institute for Research on Collective Goods	Regulating international financial markets
2011	Sebastian Thrun	Stanford University	Intelligent systems
2011	Bernhard Schölkopf	Max Planck Institute for Intelligent Systems	Intelligent systems
2010	Timothy George Bromage	New York University College of Dentistry	Evolution
2010	Michael Tomasello	Max Planck Institute for Evolutionary Anthropology	Evolution
2009	Karl Galinsky	University of Texas at Austin	History of memory
2009	Aleida Assmann	University of Konstanz	History of memory
2008	Robert S. Langer	Massachusetts Institute of Technology	Biomaterials
2008	Peter Fratzl	Max Planck Institute of Colloids and Interfaces	Biomaterials
2007	Raymond Joseph Dolan	University College London & Wellcome Trust Centre for Neuroimaging	Neuromodulation and behaviour
2007	Hans-Christian Pape	University of Münster	Neuromodulation and behaviour
2006	Alina Payne	Harvard University	Art history
2006	Horst Bredekamp	Humboldt University of Berlin	Art history
2005	Christopher Carilli	National Radio Astronomy Observatory, Socorro	Astrophysics
2005	Christof Wetterich	Heidelberg University	Astrophysics
2004	Eugene W. Myers	University of California, Berkeley	Bioinformatics
2004	Martin Vingron	Max Planck Institute for Molecular Genetics	Bioinformatics

== Organization ==
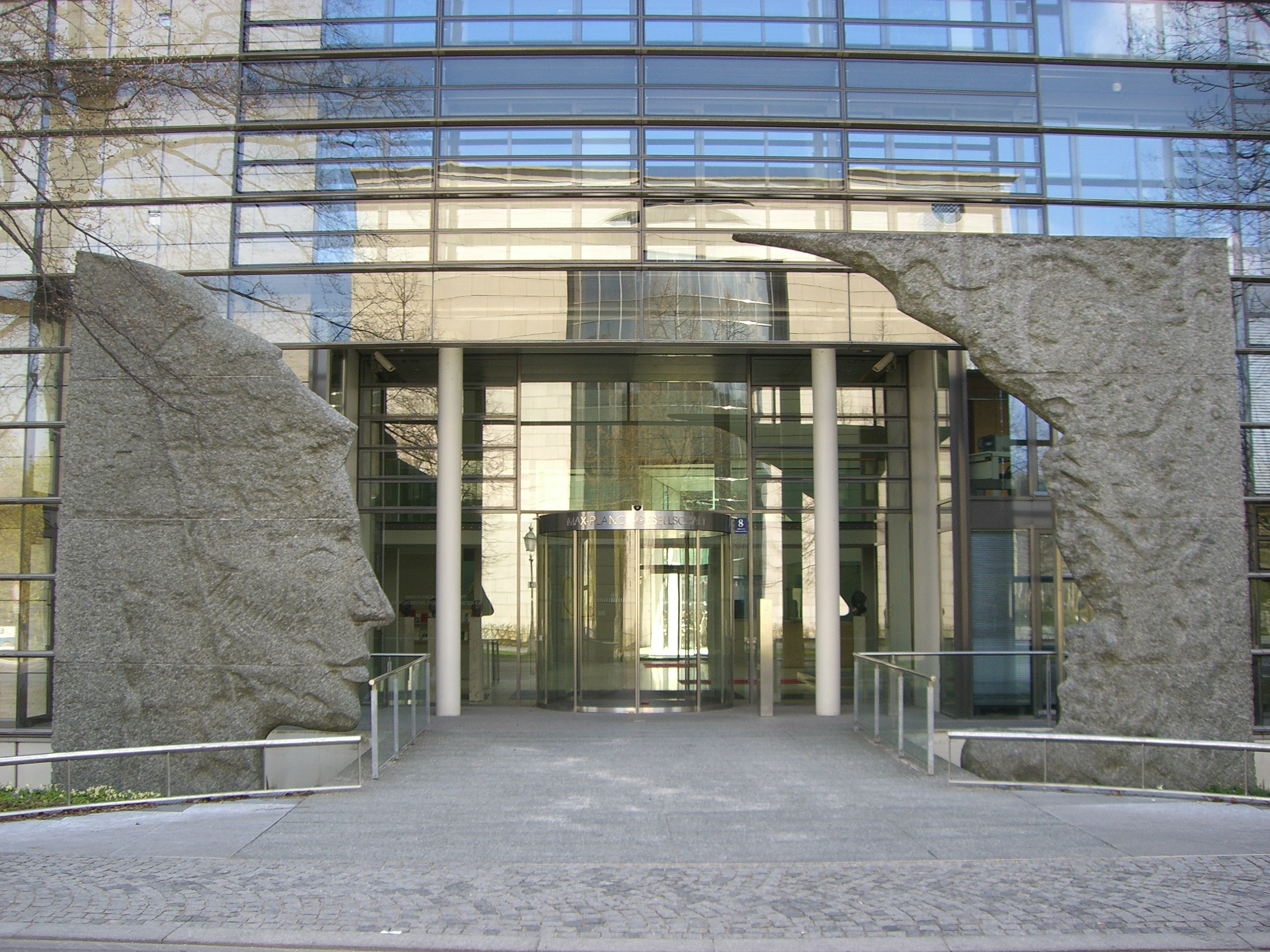
Entrance of the administrative headquarters of the Max Planck Society in Munich

The Max Planck Society is formally an eingetragener Verein, a registered association with the institute directors as scientific members having equal voting rights. The society has its registered seat in Berlin, while the administrative headquarters are located in Munich. Since June 2023, chemist and molecular biologist Patrick Cramer has been the President of the Max Planck Society.

Funding is provided predominantly from federal and state sources, but also from research and license fees and donations. One of the larger donations was the castle Schloss Ringberg near Kreuth in Bavaria, which was pledged by Luitpold Emanuel in Bayern (Duke in Bavaria). It passed to the Society after the duke died in 1973, and is now used for conferences.

=== Max Planck Institutes and research groups ===
The Max Planck Society consists of over 80 research institutes. In addition, the society funds a number of Max Planck Research Groups (MPRG) and International Max Planck Research Schools (IMPRS). The purpose of establishing independent research groups at various universities is to strengthen the required networking between universities and institutes of the Max Planck Society.

The research units are primarily located across Europe with a few in South Korea and the U.S. In 2007, the Society established its first non-European centre, with an institute on the Jupiter campus of Florida Atlantic University focusing on neuroscience.

The Max Planck Institutes operate independently from, though in close cooperation with, the universities, and focus on innovative research that does not fit into the university structure due to its interdisciplinary or transdisciplinary nature or that require resources that cannot be met by the state universities.

Internally, Max Planck Institutes are organized into research departments headed by directors such that each MPI has several directors, a position roughly comparable to anything from full professor to department head at a university. Other core members include Junior and Senior Research Fellows.

In addition, there are associated institutes:

Name	City	Country	Section
Ernst Strüngmann Institute	Frankfurt am Main	Germany	Biology & Medicine

Max Planck Society also has a collaborative center with Princeton University—Max Planck Princeton Research Center for Plasma Physics—located in Princeton, New Jersey, in the U.S. The latest Max Planck Research Center has been established at Harvard University in 2016 as the Max Planck Harvard Research Center for the Archaeoscience of the Ancient Mediterranean.

=== International Max Planck Research Schools ===
Together with the Association of Universities and other institutions in Germany, the Max Planck Society established numerous International Max Planck Research Schools (IMPRS) to promote junior scientists.

List of International Max Planck Research Schools
IMPRS Name	Associated Max Planck Institute	Location	Associated Institutions
Cologne Graduate School of Ageing Research	Biology of Ageing	Cologne	University of Cologne
Biology and Computation	Molecular Genetics	Berlin	Freie Universität Berlin, Humboldt University of Berlin
Intelligent Systems	Intelligent Systems	Tübingen and Stuttgart	University of Stuttgart, University of Tübingen
Analysis, Design and Optimization in Chemical and Biochemical Process Engineering	Dynamics of Complex Technical Systems	Magdeburg	Otto von Guericke University Magdeburg
Astronomy and Cosmic Physics	Astronomy	Heidelberg	Heidelberg University
Astrophysics	Astrophysics	Garching	TU Munich
Complex Surfaces in Material Sciences	Chemical Physics of Solids	Berlin	TU Berlin
Computer Science	Informatics	Saarbrücken	Saarland University
Earth System Modeling	Meteorology	Hamburg	University of Hamburg
Elementary Particle Physics	Physics	Munich	TU Munich, LMU Munich
Environmental, Cellular and Molecular Microbiology	Terrestrial Microbiology	Marburg	Marburg University
Evolutionary Biology	Evolutionary Biology	Plön	University of Kiel
"From Molecules to Organisms"	Biology Tübingen	Tübingen	University of Tübingen
Global Biogeochemical Cycles	Biogeochemistry	Jena	FSU Jena
Gravitational Wave Astronomy	Gravitational Physics	Hannover and Potsdam	Leibniz University Hannover, University of Potsdam
Heart and Lung Research	Heart and Lung Research	Bad Nauheim	Justus Liebig University Giessen, Goethe University Frankfurt
Infectious Diseases and Immunity	Infection Biology	Berlin	Charité Universitätsmedizin Berlin, FU Berlin, Humboldt University of Berlin
Language Sciences	Psycholinguistics	Nijmegen	Radboud University Nijmegen
Neurosciences	Multidisciplinary Sciences	Göttingen	University of Göttingen
Cognitive and Systems Neuroscience	Biological Cybernetics	Tübingen	University of Tübingen
Marine Microbiology (MarMic)	Marine Microbiology	Bremen	University of Bremen
Maritime Affairs		Hamburg	University of Hamburg
Molecular and Cellular Biology	Immunobiology and Epigenetics	Freiburg	University of Freiburg
Molecular and Cellular Life Sciences	Biochemistry	Munich	LMU Munich, TU Munich
Molecular Biology	Multidisciplinary Sciences	Göttingen	University of Göttingen
Molecular Cell Biology and Bioengineering	Molecular Cell Biology and Genetics	Dresden	TU Dresden
Molecular Biomedicine	Molecular Biomedicine	Münster	University of Münster
Multiscale Bio-Systems	Colloids and Interfaces	Potsdam	University of Potsdam
Organismal Biology	Ornithology	Konstanz	University of Konstanz
Reactive Structure Analysis for Chemical Reactions (RECHARGE)	Chemical Energy Conversion	Mülheim an der Ruhr	Ruhr University Bochum, University of Duisburg-Essen
Science and Technology of Nano-Systems	Microstructure Physics	Halle	Martin Luther University Halle-Wittenberg
Solar System Science	Solar System Research	Göttingen	University of Göttingen
Astronomy and Astrophysics	Radio Astronomy	Bonn	University of Bonn
Social and Political Constitution of the Economy	Study of Societies	Cologne	University of Cologne
Surface and Interface Engineering in Advanced Materials	Iron Research	Düsseldorf	Heinrich Heine University Düsseldorf
Ultrafast Imaging and Structural Dynamics	Structure and Dynamics of Matter	Hamburg	University of Hamburg
The Leipzig School of Human Origins	Evolutionary Anthropology	Leipzig	University of Leipzig

=== Max Planck Schools ===
- Max Planck School of Cognition
- Max Planck School Matter to Life
- Max Planck School of Photonics

=== Max Planck Center ===
- The Max Planck Centre for Attosecond Science (MPC-AS), POSTECH Pohang
- The Max Planck POSTECH Center for Complex Phase Materials, POSTECH Pohang

=== Max Planck Institutes ===
Among others:

- Kunsthistorische Institut in Florenz – Max-Planck-Institut, Florence, Italy
- Max Planck Florida Institute for Neuroscience
- Max Planck Institute for Neurobiology of Behavior – caesar, Bonn
- Max Planck Institute for Aeronomics in Katlenburg-Lindau was renamed to Max Planck Institute for Solar System Research in 2004;
- Max Planck Institute for Biology Tübingen in Tübingen;
- Max Planck Institute for Cell Biology in Ladenburg b. Heidelberg was closed in 2003;
- Max Planck Institute for Economics in Jena was renamed to the Max Planck Institute for the Science of Human History in 2014;
- Max Planck Institute for Ionospheric Research in Katlenburg-Lindau was renamed to Max Planck Institute for Aeronomics in 1958;
- Max Planck Institute for Metals Research, Stuttgart
- Max Planck Institute of Oceanic Biology in Wilhelmshaven was renamed to Max Planck Institute of Cell Biology in 1968 and moved to Ladenburg 1977;
- Max Planck Institute for Psychological Research in Munich merged into the Max Planck Institute for Human Cognitive and Brain Sciences in 2004;
- Max Planck Institute for Protein and Leather Research in Regensburg moved to Munich 1957 and was united with the Max Planck Institute for Biochemistry in 1977;
- Max Planck Institute for the Study of the Scientific-Technical World in Starnberg (from 1970 until 1981 (closed)) directed by Carl Friedrich von Weizsäcker and Jürgen Habermas.
- Max Planck Institute for Behavioral Physiology
- Max Planck Institute of Experimental Endocrinology
- Max Planck Institute for Foreign and International Social Law
- Max Planck Institute for Physics and Astrophysics
- Max Planck Research Unit for Enzymology of Protein Folding
- Max Planck Institute of Colloids and Interfaces in Potsdam
- Max Planck Institute for Coal Research in Mülheim
- Max Planck Institute for Evolutionary Anthropology in Leipzig

== Open access publishing ==
The Max Planck Society describes itself as "a co-founder of the international Open Access movement". Together with the European Cultural Heritage Online Project the Max Planck Society organized the Berlin Open Access Conference in October 2003 to ratify the Bethesda Statement on Open Access Publishing. At the Conference the Berlin Declaration on Open Access to Knowledge in the Sciences and Humanities was passed. The Berlin Declaration built on previous open access declarations, but widened the research field to be covered by open access to include humanities and called for new activities to support open access such as "encouraging the holders of cultural heritage" to provide open access to their resources.

The Max Planck Society continues to support open access in Germany and mandates institutional self-archiving of research outputs on the eDoc server and publications by its researchers in open access journals within 12 months. To finance open access the Max Planck Society established the Max Planck Digital Library. The library also aims to improve the conditions for open access on behalf of all Max Planck Institutes by negotiating contracts with open access publishers and developing infrastructure projects, such as the Max Planck open access repository.

== Criticism ==
=== Pay for PhD students ===
In 2008, the European General Court ruled in a case brought by a PhD student against the Max Planck Society that "a researcher preparing a doctoral thesis on the basis of a grant contract concluded with the Max-Planck-Gesellschaft zur Förderung der Wissenschaften eV, must be regarded as a worker within the meaning of Article 39 EC only if his activities are performed for a certain period of time under the direction of an institute forming part of that association and if, in return for those activities, he receives remuneration".

In 2012, the Max Planck Society was at the centre of a controversy about some PhD students not being given employment contracts. Of the 5,300 students who at the time wrote their PhD thesis at the 80 Max Planck Institutes 2,000 had an employment contract. The remaining 3,300 received grants of between 1,000 and 1,365 Euro. According to a 2011 statement by the Max Planck Society "As you embark on a PhD, you are still anything but a proper scientist; it's during the process itself that you become a proper scientist... a PhD is an apprenticeship in the lab, and as such it is usually not paid like a proper job – and this is, by and large, the practice at all research institutions and universities". The allegation of wage dumping for young scientists was discussed during the passing of the 2012 "Wissenschaftsfreiheitsgesetz" (Scientific Freedom Law) in the German Parliament.

=== Freedom of expression ===
In February 2024, the Max Planck Society faced widespread criticism for terminating the employment of Lebanese-Australian professor Ghassan Hage from the Max Planck Institute for Social Anthropology, citing his social media posts on the Israeli–Palestinian conflict as incompatible with the society's core values. This decision was publicly condemned by numerous scholars and academic organizations, who argued it infringed on Hage's freedom of expression. German newspaper Welt am Sonntag initially reported on Hage's posts. Following the dismissal, global academic communities, including Israeli scholars, the German Association of Social and Cultural Anthropology, the British Society for Middle Eastern Studies, the European Association of Social Anthropologists, the American Anthropological Association, the Council for Humanities, Arts and Sciences and the Australian Anthropological Society, the Canadian Anthropology Society, a Japanese group of scholars, the Australian Sociological Association, rallied in support of Hage, extensively citing Hage's own intellectual work, urging the society to reverse its decision. The Max Planck Society and the President Patrick Cramer have not yet respond to these letters, as of July 2024. The Max Planck Society has made public statements expressing support for the state of Israel in the Gaza war. Hage filed a legal challenge contesting his dismissal. In December 2024, the Labour Court Halle rejected the dismissal claim of Ghassan Hage.

=== Allegations of misconduct ===
Since at least 2018, there have been numerous accusations of bullying and harassment by senior researchers and directors at the Max Planck Society. In 2018, two high-profile cases of bullying were made public. Researchers at the Max Planck Institute for Astrophysics (MPA) in Garching accused director Guinevere Kauffmann of insulting and bullying students and making racist remarks. Researchers at the Max Planck Institute for Human Cognitive and Brain Sciences also accused director Tania Singer of bullying and intimidation. Singer resigned later that year, and Kauffman remains a director at MPA as of July 2026.

In 2021, Nicole Boivin, a director of the Max Planck Institute for the Science of Human History (renamed the Max Planck Institute for Geoanthropology in 2022), was removed after an internal investigation by the Max Planck Society reportedly determined that she had bullied junior researchers and plagiarized their work, along with other accusations. In December 2021, a court ruling reinstated her as a director. However in April 2022, she was removed following a vote by a governing board of the Max Planck Society. However, as of April 2025, she is still employed as a Research Group Leader. The same year, ecologist Ian Baldwin, a director at the Max Planck Institute for Chemical Ecology, was accused of harassing doctoral candidates and postdoctoral researchers.

In March 2025, a joint investigation between Deutsche Welle and Der Spiegel claimed there was "a systemic failure to hold abusive staff members or their institutes accountable" within the institutes they investigated. Interviews with around 30 scientists, many recruited internationally, revealed that more than half experienced or witnessed misconduct by senior staff, particularly directors and group leaders. Women and people of color were identified as being at higher risk of such abuse. Many of those interviewed within the report wished to remain anonymous to avoid retaliation. Specific allegations of misconduct against Jan-Michael Rost, director of the Max Planck Institute for the Physics of Complex Systems in Dresden, were highlighted within the report.

== Nobel Laureates ==
=== Kaiser Wilhelm Society (1914–1948) ===
1. Max von Laue, Nobel Prize in Physics in 1914
2. Richard Willstätter, Nobel Prize in Chemistry in 1915
3. Fritz Haber, Nobel Prize in Chemistry in 1918
4. Max Planck, Nobel Prize in Physics in 1918
5. Albert Einstein, Nobel Prize in Physics in 1921
6. Otto Meyerhof, Nobel Prize in Physiology or Medicine in 1922
7. James Franck, Nobel Prize in Physics in 1925
8. Carl Bosch, Nobel Prize in Chemistry in 1931
9. Otto Heinrich Warburg, Nobel Prize in Physiology or Medicine in 1931
10. Werner Heisenberg, Nobel Prize in Physics in 1932
11. Hans Spemann, Nobel Prize in Physiology or Medicine in 1935
12. Peter J. W. Debye, Nobel Prize in Chemistry in 1936
13. Richard Kuhn, Nobel Prize in Chemistry in 1938
14. Adolf Butenandt, Nobel Prize in Chemistry in 1939
15. Otto Hahn, Nobel Prize in Chemistry in 1944

=== Max Planck Society (since 1948) ===
1. Walter Bothe, Nobel Prize in Physics in 1954
2. Karl Ziegler, Nobel Prize in Chemistry in 1963
3. Feodor Lynen, Nobel Prize in Physiology or Medicine in 1964
4. Manfred Eigen, Nobel Prize in Chemistry in 1967
5. Konrad Lorenz, Nobel Prize in Physiology or Medicine in 1973
6. Georges Köhler, Nobel Prize in Physiology or Medicine in 1984
7. Klaus von Klitzing, Nobel Prize in Physics in 1985
8. Ernst Ruska, Nobel Prize in Physics in 1986
9. Johann Deisenhofer, Nobel Prize in Chemistry in 1988
10. Hartmut Michel, Nobel Prize in Chemistry in 1988
11. Robert Huber, Nobel Prize in Chemistry in 1988
12. Bert Sakmann, Nobel Prize in Physiology or Medicine in 1991
13. Erwin Neher, Nobel Prize in Physiology or Medicine in 1991
14. Paul Crutzen, Nobel Prize in Chemistry in 1995
15. Christiane Nüsslein-Volhard, Nobel Prize in Physiology or Medicine in 1995
16. Theodor W. Hänsch, Nobel Prize in Physics in 2005
17. Gerhard Ertl, Nobel Prize in Chemistry in 2007
18. Stefan W. Hell, Nobel Prize in Chemistry in 2014
19. Reinhard Genzel, Nobel Prize in Physics in 2020
20. Emmanuelle Charpentier, Nobel Prize in Chemistry in 2020
21. Klaus Hasselmann, Nobel Prize in Physics in 2021
22. Benjamin List, Nobel Prize in Chemistry in 2021
23. Svante Pääbo, Nobel Prize in Physiology or Medicine in 2022
24. Ferenc Krausz, Nobel Prize in Physics in 2023
25. Peter Hegemann, Nobel Prize in Physiology or Medicine in 2026
26. Georg Nagel, Nobel Prize in Physiology or Medicine in 2026

== See also ==
- Fraunhofer-Gesellschaft
- Gottfried Wilhelm Leibniz Scientific Community
- Harnack medal
- Helmholtz Association of German Research Centres
- Schloss Ringberg
- Ultrabright electron
