= International Max Planck Research School for Heart and Lung Research =

- Field of research: Heart and Lung Research
- Location: Hesse, Germany; 50.3697°N 8.7412°E
- Affiliations: Max Planck Institute for Heart and Lung Research
- Operating agency: Universities in Giessen and Frankfurt

International Max Planck Research School for Heart and Lung Research, also known as IMPRS for Heart and Lung Research, is a three-year graduate program offering studies in the field of heart, blood vessel and lung biology. Research areas cover development, remodeling and regeneration, stem cell biology, developmental genetics and translational research. The graduate school focuses on young research with a background in life sciences or medicine. The IMPRS for Heart and Lung Research is a joint program of the Max Planck Institute for Heart and Lung Research, Bad Nauheim, as well as of the universities in Giessen and Frankfurt.
