= Max Planck Institute for the Physics of Complex Systems =

Research institute in Germany

The Max Planck Institute for the Physics of Complex systems is one of the 84 institutes of the Max-Planck-Gesellschaft, located in Dresden, Germany.

== Research ==
The research at the institute in the field of the physics of complex systems ranges from classical to quantum physics and focuses on three main areas (see Departments). Additionally, independent research groups strengthen and interpolate the research in and between the divisions on a broad range of topics (see Research groups).

== Departments ==
- Condensed matter (headed by Roderich Moessner)
- Finite systems (headed by Jan-Michael Rost)
- Biological physics (headed by Frank Jülicher)

== Research groups ==
- Dynamics in Correlated Quantum Matter (Markus Heyl)
- Quantum aggregates (Alexander Eisfeld)
- Mesoscopic Physics of Life (Christoph A. Weber)
- Fractionalization and Topology in Quantum Matter (Inti A. N. Sodemann Villadiego)
- Statistical Physics of Living Systems (Steffen Rulands)
- Self-organization of biological structures (Jan Brugués)
- Correlations and Transport in Rydberg Matter (Matthew Eiles)
- Computational Quantum Many-body Physics (David Luitz)
- Nonlinear Time Series Analysis (Holger Kantz)
- Computational Biology and Evolutionary Genomics (Michael Hiller)
- Quantum Many-Body Systems (Anne E. B. Nielsen)
- Strongly Correlated Light-Matter Systems (Francesco Piazza)
- Order and Disorder in Driven Systems (Marko Popovic)
- Correlations and Topology (Ashley Meaghan Cook)
- Self-Organization of Multicellular Systems (Pierre Haas)

== Collaborations ==
The Institute hosts a Phd program (International Max Planck Research School - IMPRS) for Many Particle Systems in Structured Environments (previously: IMPRS for Dynamical Processes in Atoms, Molecules and Solids). The degree is usually awarded by the Technische Universität Dresden. Apart from this, the institute closely collaborates with numerous institutes at home and overseas including, for example the Leibniz Institute for Solid State and Materials Research (IFW), the Max Planck Institute for Chemical Physics of Solids (MPI-CPfS) and the Max Planck Institute of Molecular Cell Biology and Genetics. MPI PKS forms together with TU Dresden and the other non-university research institutions in Dresden the research alliance Dresden-concept.
