= Max Planck Institute of Neurobiology =

Research institute in Martinsried, Germany

- Max-Planck-Institut für Neurobiologie
- Abbreviation: MPIN
- Formation: 1998
- Dissolved: 31 December 2022
- Type: Research institute
- Location: Planegg-Martinsried, Bavaria, Germany
- Coordinates: 48°6′19″N 11°27′33″E
- Fields: Immunology, infection biology, medicine, neuroscience
- Parent organization: Max Planck Society
- Staff: about 300 (2018)

The Max Planck Institute of Neurobiology (German: Max-Planck-Institut für Neurobiologie, abbreviated MPIN) was a research institute of the Max Planck Society located in Martinsried, a suburb of Munich in Germany. It existed between 1984 and 2022 and merged with the Max Planck Institute for Ornithology to the new, joint Max Planck Institute for Biological Intelligence in 2023.

Research at the former MPI of Neurobiology centered on the basic mechanisms and functions of the developing and adult nervous system. Main focus areas include the mechanisms of information processing and storage. It is one of more than 80 institutes in the Max Planck Society.

== History and current developments ==
It was created as "Deutsche Forschungsanstalt für Psychiatrie" (DFA) in 1917, and incorporated into the Kaiser Wilhelm Society 1925 as the Kaiser Wilhelm Institute of Psychiatry. In 1954, the institute became affiliated with the Max Planck Society and became the Max Planck Institute of Psychiatry. A few years later, the institute was divided into a Clinical and a Theoretical Institute. In 1984, the Theoretical Institute moved to Martinsried (Planegg), southwest of Munich. In 1998, the Theoretical and the Clinical parts of this institute segregated and the Max Planck Institute of Neurobiology became an independent institute. In January 2023, the Max Planck Institute of Neurobiology and the Max Planck Institute for Ornithology merged to form the new Max Planck Institute for Biological Intelligence (MPI-BI).

== Scientific Focus ==
Scientific research at the Max Planck Institute of Neurobiology was grouped into five departments and several independent research groups. Numerous thematic connections between the groups result in a multitude of interactions and joint projects. About one third of the approximately 300 members of the institute come from abroad.

=== Departments ===
- For the brain to be able to recognize sensory information as such and to process them accordingly, its nerve cells need to be connected in a specific way. The department Genes – Circuits – Behavior, led by Professor Herwig Baier investigates how the information flow in such neuronal circuits steers the behavior of the organism. The central research focus lies thus on the genetic, molecular and cellular foundations of animal behavior.
- The department Synapses – Circuits – Plasticity, led by Professor Tobias Bonhoeffer pursues the question “what happens, when the brain learns?”. Unlike a static object, the structure of the brain constantly changes according to current requirements. For example, in order to learn something, the contact between single nerve cells needs to be strengthened. This is accomplished in part through the creation of new contact sites and their information-transmission sites, the synapses. The basic principles and mechanisms of this plasticity are explored in this department.
- How optical input is processed in a fly’s brain is investigated in Professor Alexander Borst’s department Circuits – Computation – Models. The “cockpit” of a fly is amazing: During its speedy flight, optical information is analyzed and processed and aversion maneuvers induced within split seconds – and all of this is done with a brain that fits easily inside a pin head. The scientists investigate how these cells accomplish their complex tasks through a combination of physiological measurements, the latest techniques in microscopy, and computer simulations. The observed circuits prove interesting also for applications in robotics.
- A real understanding of biological processes is generally only possible when these processes are studied at the site of their occurrence—in the living tissue. Optical microscopy allows the high-resolution visualization of such processes on cellular and molecular level. The department Electrons – Photons – Neurons, led by Professor Winfried Denk, works on the enhancement of existing microscopes and the development of new microscopic methods.
- The department Molecules – Signaling – Development, led by Professor Rüdiger Klein investigates the molecular mechanisms of cell communication in the nervous system. The development of something so complex like the nervous system is only possible with a highly functional cell communication. Likewise, an effective communication between neighboring as well as between more distanced cells is essential for day-to-day survival. Part of the investigations to unravel these functions includes the role of receptor tyrosine kinase in the growth and function of nerve cells.

=== Emeritus and External Scientific Members ===
The institute’s scientific reputation is also based on six well-known professors, who work regularly or permanently at the institute. The institute’s webpage provides more information about the Emeritus Scientific Members (Prof. Bert Sakmann and Prof. Hartmut Wekerle) and the External Scientific Members (Prof. Yves-Alain Barde, Prof. Reinhard Hohlfeld and Prof. Edvard Moser).

== Cooperation ==
In addition to the manifold internal cooperation is the Max Planck Institute of Neurobiology linked through numerous projects to its neighboring institutes. The Max Planck Institute of Biochemistry is situated directly next door on the Martinsried campus. Other institutes such as the University Hospital Großhadern, the Gene- und Biological-Centers of LMU Munich and the Innovation and Startup Center for Biotechnology (IZB) are only a few minutes walk away.

Close cooperation also exists between the institute and the Interdisciplinary Center for Neural Computation (ICNC) at the Hebrew University of Jerusalem (Israel), the University of California, San Diego (USA), and the Bernstein Center for Computational Neuroscience (Munich, Germany). Together with the Hebrew University of Jerusalem, the Max Planck - Hebrew University Center "Sensory Processing of the Brain in Action" was founded in 2013.

An international exchange is, among others, realized via several student-exchange programs with cooperating institutes. The participation in graduate school programs and the International Max Planck Research School (IMPRS) contribute to the education of PhD students.

== Public relations ==
The Max Planck Institute of Neurobiology attempts to render its research as transparent to the public as possible. The institute’s website informs in short news texts about ongoing work and events. Once every two years, the institute opens its doors to the general public on open day.

Visitor groups, school classes and individual pupils can gain insight into the work at the institute and see what it's like to be a scientist in the hands-on-laboratory MaxLab.
