= Tobias Bonhoeffer =

German neurobiologist (born 1960)

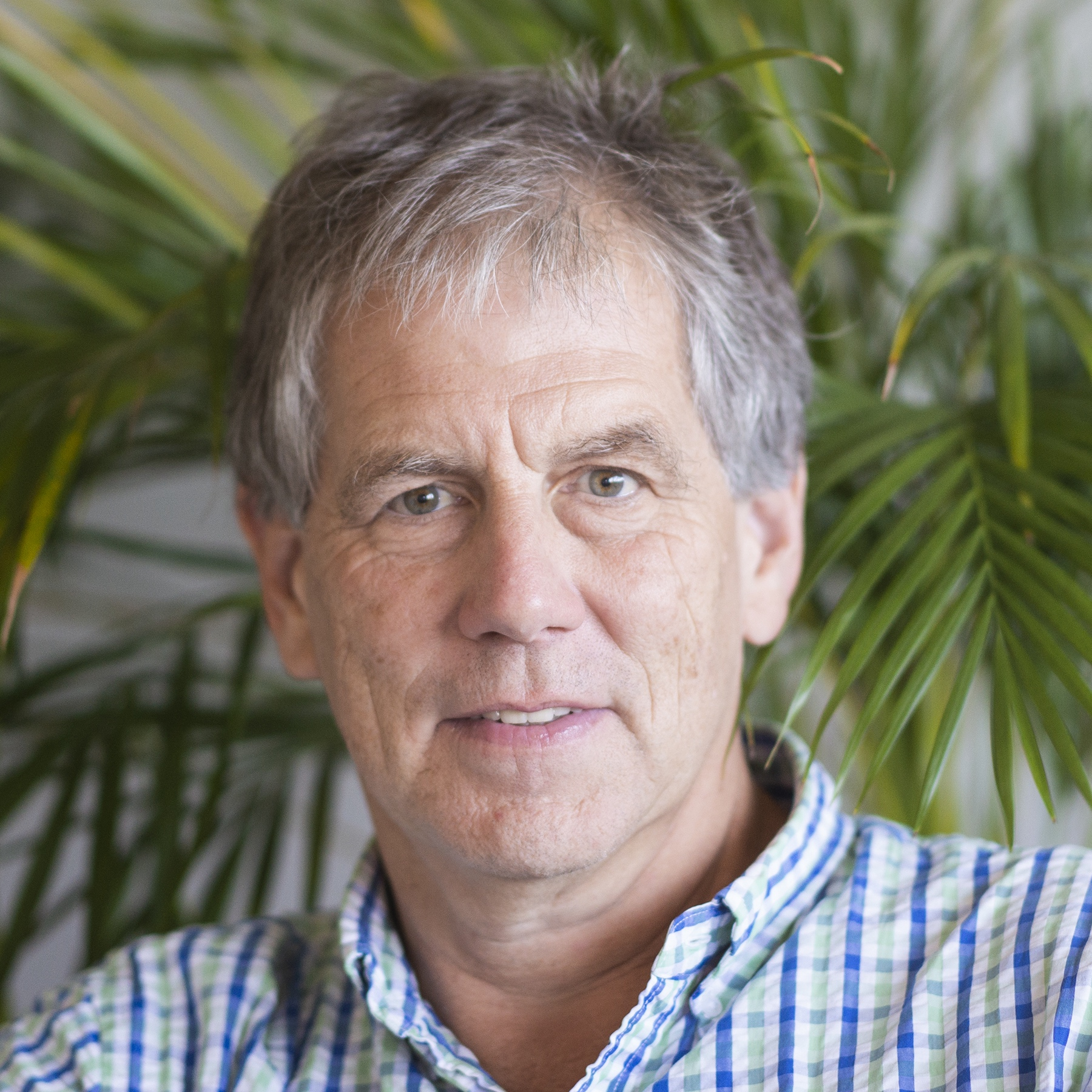
- Bonhoeffer in 2018
- Born: January 9, 1960 (age 66); Berkeley, California, U.S.
- Education: University of Göttingen
- Known for: Quantum neural networks; synaptic plasticity
- Father: Friedrich Bonhoeffer
- Awards: Ernst Jung Prize for Medizine (2004)
- Scientific career
- Fields: Neurobiology
- Workplaces: Max Planck Institute of Neurobiology; Max Planck Institute for Biological Intelligence

Tobias Bonhoeffer (born January 9, 1960) is a German-American neurobiologist. He is director of the department Synapses – Circuits – Plasticity and current managing director at the Max Planck Institute for Biological Intelligence in Martinsried near Munich (formerly Max Planck Institute of Neurobiology).

== Early life ==
Bonhoeffer was born on January 9, 1960 in Berkeley, California, U.S., as his father Friedrich Bonhoeffer was doing postdoctoral research in the lab of Howard Schachman at the University of California, Berkeley at the time. Shortly after his birth, the family returned to Germany, where his father took up a position at the Max Planck Institute for Virus Research in Tübingen. He later was appointed director at the Max Planck Institute for Developmental Biology in Tübingen.

== Education and career ==
Bonhoeffer studied physics at the University of Tübingen. He received his doctorate at the Max Planck Institute for Biological Cybernetics in Tübingen. As a postdoctoral fellow, he worked at Rockefeller University (USA) and at the Max Planck Institute for Brain Research in Frankfurt am Main. He then headed an independent research group at the Max Planck Institute of Psychiatry in Munich and was appointed in 1998 director at the Max Planck Institute of Neurobiology—which merged with the Max Planck Institute for Ornithology to the new, joint Max Planck Institute for Biological Intelligence in 2023.

From 2008 until 2011, Tobias Bonhoeffer was chairman of the Biology & Medicine Section of the Max Planck Society. In mid-2008, he was nominated as founding president of the Institute of Science and Technology Austria (ISTA) in Maria Gugging near Vienna, but announced on July 21, 2008 that he would decline the offered leadership position at the ISTA for personal reasons.

In 2014, Bonhoeffer was appointed to the Board of Governors of the UK Wellcome Trust, where he served as governor until the end of 2021. In 2016, he became a scientific advisor to the Chan Zuckerberg Initiative, founded by Mark Zuckerberg and his wife Priscilla Chan. In 2017, he was elected chairman of the Scientific Council of the Max Planck Society.

== Scientific focus ==
Bonhoeffer's work focuses on the cellular foundations of learning and memory as well as on the early postnatal development of the brain. He and his research group were the first to demonstrate the presence of "pinwheels" in the mammalian visual system, using high-resolution imaging techniques. Further research dealt with nerve growth factors, in particular brain-derived neurotrophic factor (BDNF); the functional strengthening of synapses, which is reflected in morphological changes of neurons through the formation of new dendritic spines; the targeted degradation of proteins as a mechanism for the storage of information in the nervous system; and with the process by which many cell contacts that were grown during learning are inactivated but not degraded when they are not used, which should enable much faster relearning.

== Important discoveries ==
Bonhoeffer's work led to a number of important scientific discoveries. These include:

- the demonstration of the existence of "pinwheels" in the mammalian visual system by intrinsic optical imaging (Bonhoeffer & Grinvald, Nature 1991)
- the demonstration that neurotrophins, in particular brain-derived neurotrophic factor, play an important role in synaptic plasticity (Korte et al., PNAS 1995 & 1996)
- the observation that the functional strengthening of synapses is accompanied by morphological changes in the neuron, specifically by the formation of dendritic spines (Engert & Bonhoeffer, Nature 1999)
- the demonstration that hippocampal spines exhibit activity-dependent, bidirectional structural plasticity (Nägerl et al., Neuron 2004)
- the demonstration that long-lasting synaptic plasticity depends on both protein synthesis and protein degradation (Fonseca et al., Neuron 2006)
- the finding that new synaptic contacts established during a learning process persist even if the learned information has been forgotten; this facilitates subsequent relearning (Hofer et al., Nature 2009)
- the demonstration that rodents can learn to assign visual stimuli to categories, and that important changes occur in the medial prefrontal cortex during this learning process (Reinert et al., Nature 2021)

== Awards and memberships ==
- since 2003: Member of the Academia Europaea
- 2004: Ernst Jung Prize for Medicine
- since 2006: Member of the European Molecular Biology Organization (EMBO)
- since 2010: Member of the German National Academy of Sciences Leopoldina
- since 2020: Member of the US National Academy of Sciences

== Selected scientific boards ==
- Wellcome Trust, member of the Board of Governors (2014–2021)
- Chan Zuckerberg Initiative, member of the Science Advisory Board (since 2016)
- IU International University of Applied Sciences, member of the Scientific Advisory Board (since 2022)

== See also ==
- Bonhoeffer family
