= Rüdiger Klein =

German neurobiologist and director

Rüdiger Klein (born March 24, 1958, in Nickenich) is a German neurobiologist. He was director at the Max Planck Institute for Biological Intelligence (formerly Max Planck Institute of Neurobiology) and head of the department Molecules - Signaling - Development.

Rüdiger Klein studied biology at the universities of Marburg and Tübingen and at the Juniata College (USA). He gained his PhD at the University of Tübingen and worked as a post-doctoral researcher at the National Cancer Institute at Frederick (NCI-Frederick) (USA) and at the Bristol-Myers Squibb Pharmaceutical Research Institute (USA). Afterwards, he led a junior research group at the European Molecular Biology Laboratory (EMBL) in Heidelberg. In 2001, he was appointed director at the Max Planck Institute of Neurobiology (emeritus 2026).

== Positions and Awards ==
- Member of the European Molecular Biology Organization in 1998.
- Hansen Family Award in 2005.
- Professor at the LMU Munich in 2006.
- Remedios Caro Almela Prize for Research in Developmental Neurobiology in 2008.
- ERC Advanced Grant (2.5 million Euros over five years), for the project "Redesigning brain circuits in development," studying amygdala circuit formation in 2020.
- ERC Synergy Grant (together with Wolfgang Baumeister and Matthias Mann of the Max Planck Institute of Biochemistry), focused on toxic protein aggregation in neurodegeneration.

== Scientific focus ==
Rüdiger Klein’s scientific research is focused on the molecular mechanisms which allow nerve cells to communicate.

Rüdiger Klein’s work led to a number of scientific findings. Among these were

1. the discovery of the receptors (TRK) of certain nerve growth factors. (Klein et al., Cell 1991a,b)
2. the proof that certain signalling molecules (ephrins) guide the growth direction of nerve cell axons via repulsion. (Henkemeyer et al., Cell 1996; Orioli et al., EMBO Journal 1996; Brückner et al., Science 1997)
3. the observation that ephrins regulate not only the development of the nervous system but also that of the lymphatic system and blood vessels. (Adams et al., Genes Dev. 1999; Mäkinen et al. Genes Dev. 2005)
