= International Max Planck Research School for Organismal Biology =

The International Max Planck Research School for Organismal Biology founded in 2009, was a structured doctoral program of the former Max Planck Institute for Ornithology in Seewiesen (Pöcking) (now re-structured to the MPI for Biological Intelligence in Seewiesen, established in 2023, and the MPI of Animal Behaviour in Radolfzell and Konstanz, established in 2019) and the Department of Biology of the University of Konstanz. In October 2010, the first 30 doctoral students began their research, and until 2023, 105 have graduated. The faculty consisted of over 35 leading scientists with a focus on behavioral science, ecology, evolutionary biology, physiology and neurobiology of the former Max Planck Institute for Ornithology and the Department of Biology at the Universität Konstanz. The goal of the IMPRS for Organismal Biology was to provide first-class training and education to doctoral students (equivalent to PhD) from around the world, in a stimulating, world-renown research environment. The school officially ended in 2023.

However, since 2023, Seewiesen continues to offer a new structured doctoral training with the IMPRS - Biological Intelligence jointly with the Munich universities. The IMPRS for Quantitative Behaviour, Ecology & Evolution from lab to field (IMPRS-QBEE) is the current vibrant graduate program for doctoral students in Radolfzell and Konstanz, near Lake Constance since 2022.
