= Ernst Jung Prize =

The Ernst Jung Prize is a prize awarded annually for excellence in biomedical sciences. The Ernst Jung Foundation, funded by Hamburg merchant Ernst Jung in 1967, has awarded the Ernst Jung Prize in Medicine, now €300,000, since 1976, and the lifetime achievement Ernst Jung Gold Medal for Medicine since 1990.

== Ernst Jung Prize for Medicine ==
Source: Jung Foundation

- 1976: Donald Henderson and Lorenz Zimmerman
- 1977: Georg F. Springer and John B. West
- 1979: Karl Lennert and Anthony G. E. Pearse
- 1980: Eberhard Dodt, Alan Parks and Bruno Speck
- 1981: David E. Kuhl
- 1982: Hartmut Wekerle and Rolf M. Zinkernagel
- 1983: Hans-Jürgen Bretschneider and Richard Lower
- 1984: George Gee Jackson, Werner Franke and Klaus Weber
- 1985: Hendrik Coenraad Hemker, Rudolf Pichlmayr and Peter K. Vogt
- 1986: Albrecht Fleckenstein
- 1987: Peter Richardson and Karl Julius Ullrich
- 1988: Helmut Sies and Charles Weissmann
- 1989: Thomas F. Budinger and Jon van Rood
- 1990: Gerhard Giebisch and Wilhelm Stoffel
- 1991: David Ho and Klaus Starke
- 1992: Roy Yorke Calne and Martin E. Schwab
- 1993: Charles A. Dinarello and Robert Machemer
- 1994: Terence Jones and Wolf Singer
- 1995: Anthony Fauci and Samuel A. Wells
- 1996: Harald zur Hausen and Eberhard Nieschlag
- 1997: Francis V. Chisari, Hans Hengartner and Judah Folkman
- 1998: Alain Fischer
- 1999: Adriano Aguzzi and Hans A. Kretzschmar
- 2000: Martin J. Lohse and Peter H. Krammer
- 2001: Christine Petit and Thomas Jentsch
- 2002: Michael Frotscher and Christian Haass
- 2003: Ari Helenius and Reinhard Lührmann
- 2004: Stuart A. Lipton and Tobias Bonhoeffer
- 2005: Ernst Hafen and Franz-Ulrich Hartl
- 2006: Reinhard Jahn and Markus F. Neurath
- 2007: Andreas Zeiher, Stefanie Dimmeler and Josef Penninger
- 2008: Thomas Benzing, Gerd Walz and Thomas Tuschl
- 2009: Jens Claus Brüning and Patrick Cramer
- 2010: Stephen G. Young and Peter Carmeliet
- 2011: Hans Clevers and Christian Büchel
- 2012: Peter Walter and Elisa Izaurralde
- 2013: Angelika Amon and Ivan Đikić
- 2014: Thomas Boehm
- 2015: Emmanuelle Charpentier
- 2016: Hans-Georg Rammensee
- 2017: Tobias Moser and Nenad Ban
- 2018: Ruth E. Ley and Marco Prinz
- 2019: Brenda A. Schulman and Gary R. Lewin
- 2020: Matthias Tschöp
- 2021: Christian Hertweck
- 2022: Ralf Bartenschlager and Ingrid Fleming
- 2023: Özlem Türeci

== Ernst Jung Gold Medal for Medicine ==
Source: Jung Foundation

- 1990: Beatrice Mintz
- 1991: Heinrich Schipperges
- 1992: Hans Erhard Bock
- 1993: Robert Daroff
- 1994: Hanns Hippius
- 1995: Friedrich Stelzner
- 1996: Karl-Hermann Meyer zum Büschenfelde
- 1997: Rudolf Haas and Walter Siegenthaler
- 1998: Wolfgang Gerok
- 1999: Hans Wilhelm Schreiber
- 2000: Gert Riethmüller
- 2001: Gustav Born
- 2002: Harald Reuter
- 2003: Volker ter Meulen
- 2004: Werner Creutzfeldt
- 2005: Christian Herfarth
- 2006: Dietrich Niethammer
- 2007: Hans Thoenen
- 2008: Hans-Dieter Klenk
- 2009: Volker Diehl
- 2010: Klaus Rajewsky
- 2011: Michel Lazdunski
- 2012: Peter Herrlich
- 2013: Salvador Moncada
- 2014: Charles Weissmann
- 2015: Walter Neupert
- 2016: Peter Libby
- 2017: Pascale Cossart
- 2018: Wolfgang Baumeister
- 2019: Pietro De Camilli
- 2021: Antonio Lanzavecchia
- 2022: Alain Fischer
- 2023: Stefan Rose-John

== See also ==
- List of medicine awards
