= Alexander Borst =

German neurobiologist

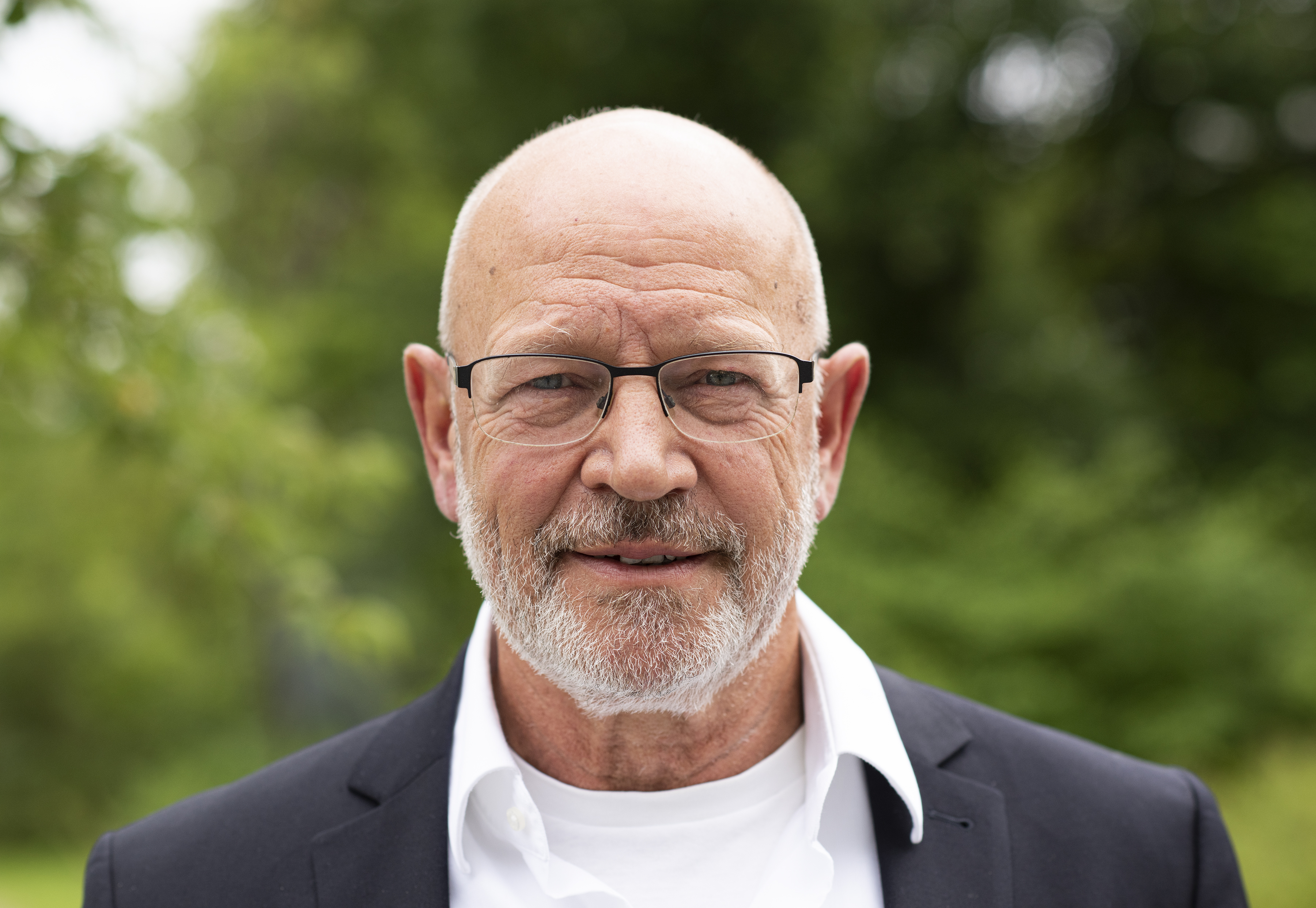
Alexander Borst (2021)

Alexander "Axel" Borst (born August 18, 1957 in Bad Neustadt an der Saale) is a German neurobiologist. He was director at the Max Planck Institute for Biological Intelligence (formerly Max Planck Institute of Neurobiology) and head of the department Circuits – Computation – Models (2001–2025).

Borst studied biology at the University of Würzburg, where he obtained his PhD as a member of Martin Heisenberg's group. He worked as a post-doctoral researcher at the Max Planck Institute for Biological Cybernetics in Tübingen. Afterwards, he led an Independent Junior Research Group at the Friedrich Miescher Laboratory of the Max Planck Society. He was professor the University of California, Berkeley. In 2001, he was appointed director at the Max Planck Institute of Neurobiology.

Borst is member of the German Academy of Sciences Leopoldina, the Bavarian Academy of Sciences and Humanities and the European Molecular Biology Organization (EMBO). Among others, he received the Research Award of the Federation of European Neuroscience Societies (FENS) 2014 and the Valentino Braitenberg Award for Computational Neuroscience 2014.

== Scientific focus ==
In his doctoral research, Borst studied the olfactory sense of Drosophila melanogaster. He discovered that dedicated brain structures known as mushroom bodies play a crucial role in olfactory learning in flies (Heisenberg, Borst, Wagner, Byers, J. Neurogenetics 1985).

Since then, his work has focused on the question of how nerve cells process information and perform certain calculations. As an example of neuronal computation, he uses motion vision, i.e. the process by which nerve cells in the visual center of flies calculate the direction of motion of an object.

Borst’s research aims to connect a formal, mathematical description of these processes with the underlying biophysical properties of nerve cells. By combining theoretical approaches and computer simulations with various experimental studies, he made the following major discoveries:

- The calculation of directional motion in the fly brain formally follows to a large extent the so-called Reichardt model (Single & Borst, Science 1998).
- Similar to the vertebrate retina, this computation is performed in two parallel pathways, an ON and an OFF channel (Jösch et al., Nature 2010).
- In each of these channels, four subsets of neurons exist (T4 cells in the ON, T5 cells in the OFF channel), each maximally sensitive to one of the four orthogonal directions of motion (right, left, up, down). These cells are connected to four separate layers of neural tissue, where they are interconnected with large heading control neurons (Maisak et al., Nature 2013).
- In T4 cells, the signal multiplication postulated in the Reichardt model is biophysically based on disinhibition (Groschner et al., Nature 2022).
