= Herwig Baier =

German neurobiologist

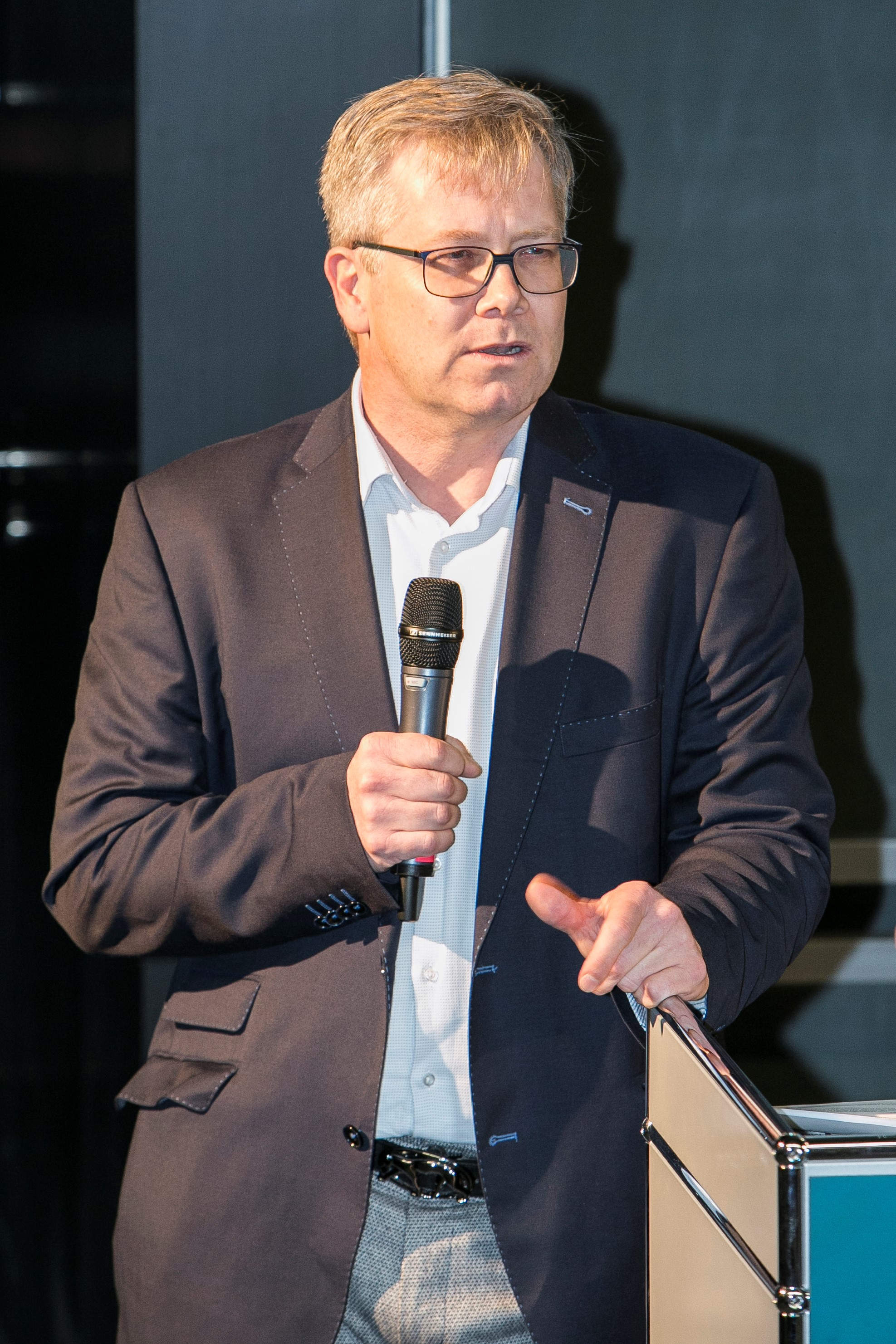
- Herwig Baier in March 2017
- Education: University of Konstanz; Max Planck Institute for Developmental Biology
- Scientific career
- Workplaces: University of California, San Francisco; Max Planck Institute of Neurobiology; Max Planck Institute for Biological Intelligence
- Doctoral advisor: Friedrich Bonhoeffer
- Other academic advisors: Bill Harris; Christiane Nüsslein-Volhard

Herwig Baier is a German-American neuroscientist and biologist. He is Director at the Max Planck Institute for Biological Intelligence and head of the department Genes – Circuits – Behavior. Herwig Baier's research aims to understand how animal brains convert sensory inputs into behavioral responses and how evolution has shaped neuronal circuits.

Herwig Baier studied biology at the University of Konstanz. In 1990, he joined Friedrich Bonhoeffer's laboratory at the Max Planck Institute for Developmental Biology in Tübingen, where he obtained his diploma (1990) and PhD degree (1995). For his post-doctoral training, he moved to the University of California, San Diego, to work with William (Bill) Harris. In 1997, Baier was offered a faculty position by the University of California, San Francisco, where he remained as Full Professor until 2012. In 2011, the Max Planck Society recruited him as a Scientific Member and Director at the Max Planck Institute of Neurobiology in Martinsried (Germany).

== Scientific focus ==
The overarching theme of Baier's scientific contributions to neuroscience has been the elucidation of molecular, cellular, synaptic and circuit mechanisms of neuronal development, nervous system function, and animal behavior. His research has focused on the following questions:

1. How do neurons become different during development? How are their processes guided to their targets, and how do they form specific synaptic connections?
2. What are the specific functions of neuronal cell types in perception, cognition, and behavior?
3. How do perceptual, cognitive, and behavioral functions emerge as the brain develops?

Herwig Baier's work led to a number of scientific discoveries:

- Establishing zebrafish for neuroscience: Since the early 1990s, Baier pioneered the use of zebrafish (Danio rerio), as an experimental model for neuroscience and behavioral genetics, taking advantage of the optical transparency of these animals at larval stages and their genetic modifiability. This work led to the first large-scale behavioral screens in search of genes that wire the visual system for behavior. (Baier et al., Development 1996; Neuhauss et al., Journal of Neuroscience 1999; Muto et al., PLOS Genetics 2005)
- Molecular and cellular mechanisms underlying the formation of retinotopic and visual feature maps: Baier contributed to the identification of gradient-based axon guidance mechanisms during development of the visual system. His group also discovered the role of Slit-Robo signaling in the precise targeting of layers in the optic tectum by ingrowing retinal axons. (Baier and Bonhoeffer, Science 1992; Gosse et al., Nature 2008; Xiao et al., Cell 2011)
- Cell fate decisions in the developing visual system: Baier discovered the role of interkinetic nuclear migration in apportioning cell fates in the retina. (Del Bene et al., Cell 2008)
- Remote optical control of behavior: Baier's group was the first to use optogenetic techniques for circuit analysis in zebrafish. By targeting the expression of fluorescent indicators and optogenetic effectors, such as Channelrhodopsin (ChR2), Halorhodopsin (NpHR) or the light-activated glutamate receptor (LiGluR), to specific brain areas and shining light at single neurons, he and his collaborators showed that an animal's behavior can be reversibly and specifically altered on millisecond timescales. (Szobota et al., Neuron 2007; Arrenberg et al., Proc. Natl. Acad. Sci. USA 2009; Wyart et al., Nature 2009)
- Two-photon optogenetics with 3D resolution in the intact brain of a behaving animal: In 2017, Baier's team introduced an optical technique that enables precise remote control of neural activity, called two-photon holographic optogenetics. By inserting a spatial light modulator into the optical path of a two-photon microscope, the technique allows to photostimulate an arbitrary population of single neurons in the zebrafish brain while observing the resulting behavior. This method is instrumental for the functional annotation of neural circuits. (Dal Maschio et al., Neuron 2017)
- Cell-type profiling in the visual system and genetic mechanisms that make neurons different: Baier’s team employs single-cell RNA sequencing and spatial transcriptomics to develop catalogs of neuronal cell types in the retina, tectum, and other visual areas. (Kölsch et al., Neuron 2021; Shainer et al., Science Advances 2023; Sherman et al., Nature Communications 2023)
- Cellular-synaptic mechanism of an elementary form of spatial attention: Baier discovered how zebrafish larval brains prioritize visual stimuli. (Fernandes et al., Neuron 2021)
- Recognition of conspecifics in the context of social behavior: Baier’s group discovered simple visual stimuli that elicit shoaling behavior and revealed a neuronal circuit in the fish brain that processes these stimuli. (Larsch & Baier, Current Biology 2018; Kappel et al., Nature 2022)
- Electron-microscopic connectome of the larval zebrafish brain at synapse scale: Baier, in collaboration with Winfried Denk and a team at Google research, published the first automatically segmented image stack of a complete zebrafish brain volume. (Svara et al., Nature Methods 2022)
- Zebrafish models of neurological and psychiatric disease: Baier and Baraban established an influential treatment protocol that induces epileptic seizures in larval zebrafish. Baier also developed a genetic model for glucocorticoid resistance, which mimics depression-like symptoms in zebrafish. (Baraban et al., Neuroscience 2007; Ziv et al., Molecular Psychiatry 2013)

== Recognition ==
Baier received the Otto Hahn Medal of the Max Planck Society (1995) for his PhD work and a Feodor Lynen Fellowship of the Alexander von Humboldt Foundation (1995). As a faculty member at UCSF, he received the David and Lucile Packard Fellowship in Science and Engineering (1999), the Sloan Fellowship in Neuroscience (2000), the Klingenstein Award (2001), and the Byers Award for Basic Science Research (2006). He is an honorary professor of LMU Munich, and a member of the European Molecular Biology Organization (EMBO).

== Industry activities ==
In 2001, Herwig Baier co-founded, with Bill Harris and Paul Goldsmith, Daniolabs Ltd (Cambridge, UK), a biotech company with a focus on zebrafish drug screening for the discovery new treatments of ophthalmic, neurological and gastrointestinal diseases.

Baier serves as a scientific consultant to biotech companies.
