= Eberhard Neumann =

Biochemist and biophysicist (born 1939)

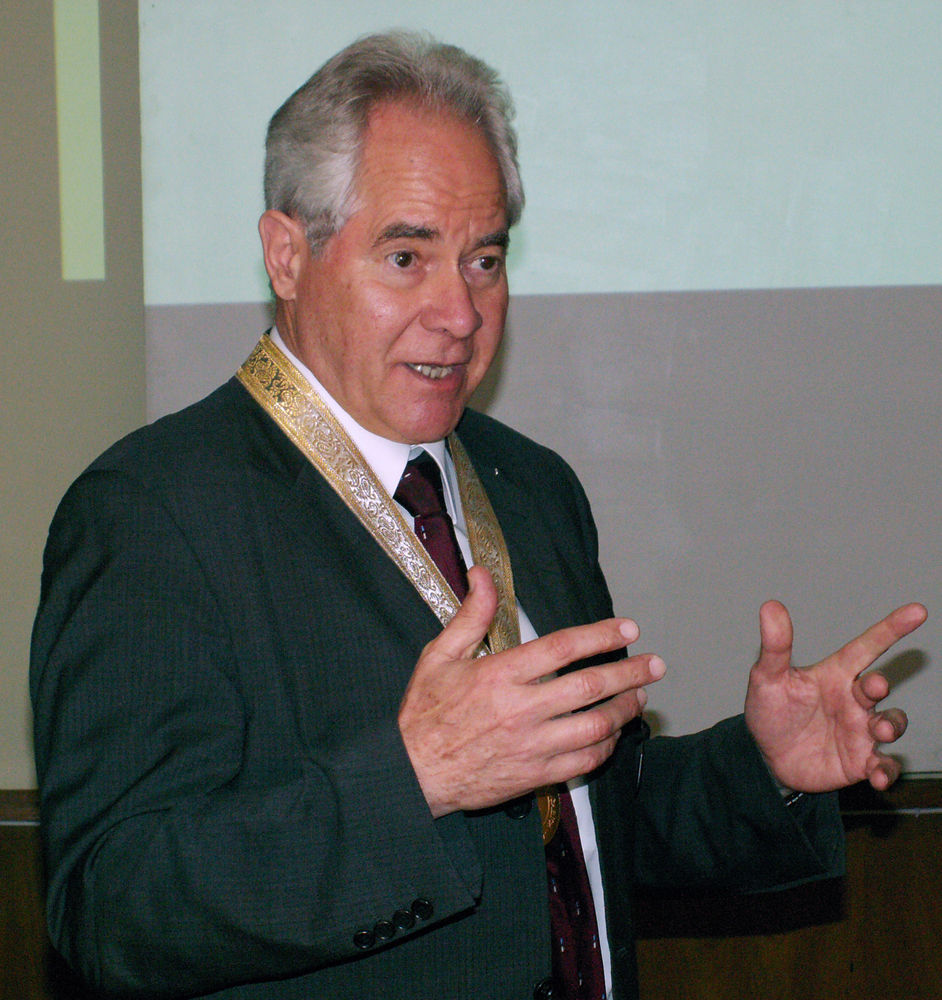
- Neumann in 2006
- Born: June 17, 1939 (age 87); Breslau, Germany (now Wrocław, Poland)
- Known for: Early work on electroporation for gene transfer into mammalian cells
- Awards: Honorary doctorate, University of Ljubljana (2006)
- Scientific career
- Fields: Biochemistry, Biophysics
- Workplaces: Bielefeld University; Max Planck Institute of Biochemistry

Eberhard Neumann (born 17 June 1939) is a German biochemist and biophysicist associated with research on bioelectric phenomena in membranes and the use of electric pulses in biotechnology. He is noted for early work that helped establish electroporation as a method for introducing DNA into mammalian cells. Later reviews credit Neumann with coining the term "electroporation" in 1982.

== Biography ==
Neumann was born in Breslau on 17 June 1939. He received a doctorate from the University of Münster in 1967 and completed his habilitation at the University of Konstanz in 1973. From 1975 to 1983 he worked at the Max Planck Institute of Biochemistry in Martinsried. In 1983 he became chair of physical and biophysical chemistry at Bielefeld University and retired in 2005.

== Research ==
Neumann's research has addressed the physical chemistry of biological electricity and biotechnological applications of electric pulses, including membrane transport processes relevant to drug and gene delivery.

In early work on electric-field effects on membranes, Neumann and Kurt Rosenheck reported transient permeability changes induced by short electric impulses in vesicular membranes.

In 1980, Neumann and co-workers demonstrated electrically induced cell fusion (electrofusion) in Dictyostelium.

In a 1982 paper, Neumann and co-authors reported that brief high-field electric pulses increased DNA uptake in mouse cells, producing stable transformants, and proposed an "electroporation model" for membrane transport in strong electric fields. A 2006 Nature Methods historical overview described Neumann as an early pioneer who helped advance the use of electroporation for delivering DNA into mammalian cells and noted that his group "dubbed" the process electroporation.

== Memberships and honors ==
Neumann was elected a member of the European Molecular Biology Organization (EMBO) in 1980.

He served as chair (Vorsitzender) of the German Biophysical Society (Deutsche Gesellschaft für Biophysik, DGfB). The DGfB is listed by the International Union for Pure and Applied Biophysics (IUPAB) as Germany’s adhering body and national society for biophysics.

== Selected works ==
- Neumann, E.; Schaefer-Ridder, M.; Wang, Y.; Hofschneider, P. H. (1982). "Gene transfer into mouse lyoma cells by electroporation in high electric fields". The EMBO Journal. 1(7): 841–845. doi:10.1002/j.1460-2075.1982.tb01257.x. PMID 6329708. PMCID PMC553119.
- Neumann, E.; Kakorin, S.; Toensing, K. (1999). "Fundamentals of electroporative delivery of drugs and genes". Bioelectrochemistry and Bioenergetics. 48(1): 3–16. doi:10.1016/S0302-4598(99)00008-2. PMID 10228565.
- Neumann, E.; Kakorin, S. (2018). "Membrane electroporation: chemical thermodynamics and flux kinetics revisited and refined". European Biophysics Journal. 47(4): 373–387. doi:10.1007/s00249-018-1305-3. PMID 29737373.
