= Reinhard Jahn =

German biophysicist and neurobiologist (born 1950)

- Born: 21 December 1950 (age 75); Leverkusen, Germany
- Education: University of Göttingen
- Known for: Membrane fusion
- Awards: Leibniz Prize (2000); Ernst Jung Prize (2006); Balzan Prize (2016)
- Scientific career
- Fields: Biology
- Workplaces: University of Göttingen and Max Planck Institute for Biophysical Chemistry
- Doctoral advisor: Hans-Dieter Söling
- Website: www.uni-goettingen.de/en/56703.html; www.mpibpc.mpg.de/jahn; www.nasonline.org/directory-entry/reinhard-jahn-ugzwmq/

Reinhard Jahn (born 21 December 1950) is a German biophysicist and neurobiologist known for his studies of cellular membrane fusion. For these investigations, he has been honored with numerous awards, including the 2000 Leibniz Award. Jahn is currently director at the Max Planck Institute for Biophysical Chemistry and the president of the University of Göttingen in Göttingen, Germany.

== Early life and education ==
Reinhard Jahn was born in Leverkusen, Germany, in 1950. He moved to Göttingen to study biology and biochemistry. Working in the lab of Hans-Dieter Söling, in 1981 he received a PhD from the University of Göttingen.

== Career and research ==
Jahn moved to New York City to work as a postdoc in the lab of Paul Greengard, where he went on to become an assistant professor at The Rockefeller University. In 1986 he returned to Germany as a junior group leader at the Max Planck Institute of Biochemistry in Munich. In 1991 he moved to New Haven to join the faculty at the Yale School of Medicine, where he became a Howard Hughes Medical Institute Investigator. He was recruited back to his alma mater to become director at the Max Planck Institute for Biophysical Chemistry, position which he holds currently. In 2019 he was additionally elected as president of the University of Göttingen.

== Awards and honors ==
- 1990: Max Planck Research Award
- 2000: Leibniz Prize
- 2004: Member of the Leopoldina
- 2006: Ernst Jung Prize
- 2008: Sir Bernard Katz Prize
- 2010: Lower Saxony Science Award
- 2014: Heinrich Wieland Prize
- 2015: Foreign associate of the National Academy of Sciences (United States)
- 2015: Member of the Academia Europaea
- 2015: Full member of the Göttingen Academy of Sciences and Humanities
- 2016: Communitas Prize of the Max Planck Society
- 2016: Balzan Prize
