= Hartmut Wekerle =

German neurobiologist

- Born: 30 May 1944 (age 82); Germany
- Education: University of Freiburg
- Occupations: Medical Scientist, Neurobiologist
- Spouse: Rosa-Laura Oropeza Wekerle

Hartmut Wekerle (born 30 May 1944) is a German medical scientist and neurobiologist. He is an emeritus director at the Max Planck Institute of Neurobiology and was the head of the department of Neuroimmunology until 2012.

== Biography ==
Hartmut Wekerle was born in Waldshut in 1944. He studied medicine at the University of Freiburg. In 1967, he began scientific research at the Max Planck Institute for Immunobiology in Freiburg as a PhD student under Herbert Fischer. He finished his doctorate in 1971. After graduation, he worked at the Weizmann Institute of Science from 1971 to 1973 as a postdoctorate researcher. Later on, he led the Research Group for Multiple Sclerosis at the Institute of Clinical Neurobiology at the University Hospital of the University of Würzburg. In 1988, he was appointed director at the Max Planck Institute of Neurobiology (now Max Planck Institute for Biological Intelligence). After receiving the Emeritus status at the institute in 2012, he continued his research for another five years as a Senior Professorship funded by the Hertie Foundation.

== Scientific focus ==
Hartmut Wekerle's work has been devoted to the study of cellular immune responses and mechanisms in the course of multiple sclerosis and other inflammatory diseases in the nervous system.

In particular, his research contributed to the following discoveries:

- Detection of autoreactive T cell clones in the healthy immune system and their activation in autoimmune encephalomyelitis
- Immunocompetence of central nervous glial cells
- Regulatory CD8 T cells in experimental autoimmune encephalomyelitis
- Regulation of CNS immune reactivity by active neurons
- Migration pathways of autoimmune T cells to the central nervous system
- Activation of CNS autoimmune T cells by intestinal microbiota
- Activation of CNS autoimmune T cells by MS derived microbiota

== Awards (Selection) ==
- Ernst Jung Prize for Medicine (1982)
- K-J. Zülch Prize (1999, awarded by the Max Planck Society, now known as The International Prize for Translational Neuroscience of the Gertrud Reemtsma Foundation)
- Charcot Award (International Federation of MS Societies, 2001)
- Louis D Award (Grand Prix des Academies des Sciences, Paris, 2002)
- Betty and David Koetser Award (Zurich, 2005)
- Jacob Henle Medal (University of Göttingen, 2017)

== Honorary Degrees and Memberships ==
- Honorary Professor, LMU Munich (1993)
- Member of the German National Academy of Sciences Leopoldina (2002)
- Hertie School Senior Professorship (2011)
- Honorary Doctorate of the Medical Faculty of the University of Hamburg (2013)
- Honorary Doctorate of the University of Würzburg (2014)
- Honorary Member of the Société Française de Neurologie (2016)
- Honorary Member of the Cuban Neursocience Society (2017)
- Member of the Academia Europaea (2024)
