= Friedrich Bonhoeffer =

German neuroscientist and physicist (1932–2021)

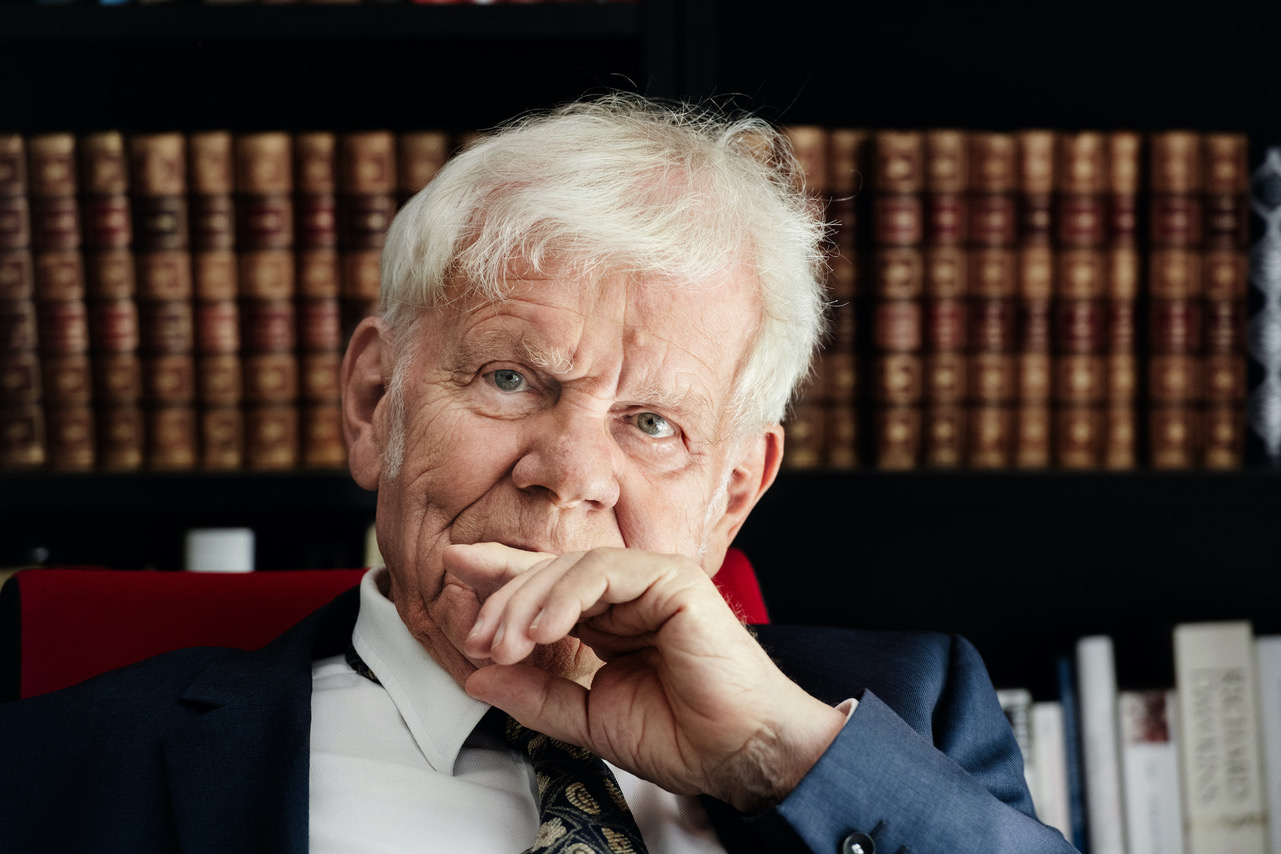
- Born: August 10, 1932; Frankfurt, Germany
- Died: January 29, 2021 (aged 88); Tübingen, Germany
- Education: University of Göttingen
- Known for: Axon guidance landmark studies
- Children: Tobias Bonhoeffer; Philipp Bonhoeffer; Sebastian Bonhoeffer
- Father: Karl-Friedrich Bonhoeffer
- Relatives: Karl Bonhoeffer (grandfather)
- Awards: Gruber Prize in Neuroscience 2020
- Scientific career
- Workplaces: Max Planck Institute for Virus Research; Max Planck Institute for Developmental Biology
- Doctoral advisor: Arnold Flammersfeld
- Other academic advisors: Howard Schachman
- Doctoral students: Herwig Baier

Johann Friedrich Bonhoeffer (August 10, 1932 – January 29, 2021), more often Friedrich Bonhoeffer, was a German neuroscientist and physicist known for pioneering studies in axon guidance.

== Education and career ==
Bonhoeffer was born in Frankfurt, Germany. He was the grandson of noted psychiatrist Karl Bonhoeffer and the son of physical chemist Karl-Friedrich Bonhoeffer. From a young age, Bonhoeffer was interested in physics and chemistry, and went on to study physics at the University of Göttingen, where he received his PhD in nuclear physics in 1958 under the supervision of Arnold Flammersfeld. After his doctoral studies, Bonhoeffer was inspired by a lecture by Max Delbrück to switch from studying neutrinos to nucleic acids. He received a Fulbright scholarship and went to the United States to do postdoctoral research in the lab of Howard Schachman at the University of California, Berkeley. In 1960, he returned to Germany to work with Alfred Gierer at the Max Planck Institute for Virus Research. He soon became the director of the institute, where he began researching axon guidance, the process by which axons of neurons grow and branch out to find their targets in the developing nervous system.

Throughout the 1970s and 1980s, Bonhoeffer made a series of landmark contributions to understanding the molecular mechanisms behind axon guidance. He developed key techniques that are still widely used today, and used them to uncover fundamental axon guidance mechanisms. His discoveries led to the identification of the first known Ephrin guidance molecules, as well as other axon guidance mechanisms.

In 1984, Bonhoeffer became the director of the newly founded Max Planck Institute for Developmental Biology, a position he held until his retirement in 2000. He continued to be involved with the institute as an emeritus director.

== Honors and awards ==
Bonhoeffer's work has been recognized with numerous awards and honors, including memberships in the German Academy of Sciences, Leopoldina, and the European Molecular Biology Organization. He was a co-recipient of the Gruber Prize in Neuroscience in 2020.

== Miscellaneous ==
The sea snail species Lophiotoma friedrichbonhoefferi, discovered by his colleague and friend Baldomero Olivera, bears his name.

== See also ==
- Bonhoeffer family
