= Ralf Jungmann =

German physicist

- Education: Saarland University, University of California, Santa Barbara (Diploma), Technical University of Munich (PhD)
- Known for: DNA-PAINT
- Scientific career
- Fields: Super-Resolution Microscopy, DNA Nanotechnology, Biophysics, Single Molecule Experiments
- Workplaces: LMU Munich; Max Planck Institute of Biochemistry; Wyss Institute for Biologically Inspired Engineering at Harvard University
- Thesis: DNA origami as a molecular platform for bionanotechnology (2010)
- Doctoral advisor: Friedrich Simmel
- Website: Jungmann Lab

Ralf Jungmann is a German physicist and Full Professor (Physics) and Chair for Molecular Physics of Life at LMU Munich, Germany. He is known for his contributions to the development of super-resolution microscopy techniques. In particular, he is known for his work on DNA-PAINT, a super-resolution technique that uses short DNA strands to label and locate specific molecules within a sample with high precision.

== Education ==
Between 2001 and 2006, Jungmann pursued a degree in Physics at Saarland University and the University of California, Santa Barbara. During his time at the latter institution, he conducted his Diploma thesis under the guidance of Paul K. Hansma. Subsequently, from 2007 to 2010, he completed his Ph.D. in Physics at Technical University of Munich, where he worked in the laboratory of Friedrich Simmel.

== Career and research ==
Between 2011 and 2014, Jungmann served as a postdoctoral researcher at the Wyss Institute for Biologically Inspired Engineering at Harvard University, working under the guidance of Peng Yin and William M Shih.

In 2014, Jungmann returned to the Germany to work as a Research group Leader at the Max Planck Institute of Biochemistry and LMU Munich.

Jungmann's professional career advanced significantly, with him being promoted to different positions throughout the years. He was appointed as an Associate Professor (Physics) Tenure Track in 2016, followed by his promotion to Associate Professor (Physics) with Tenure in 2021. In 2023, he was appointed as Full Professor (Physics) and Chair for Molecular Physics of Life.

Jungmann's research primarily focuses on developing and applying new biophysical and imaging techniques, especially super-resolution microscopy, to investigate the organization and function of biological systems at the molecular level. His work has important applications in the study of various biological processes, including gene expression, protein interactions, and cellular signaling, and has contributed to the development of nanotechnology and DNA-based computing.

Jungmann is particularly well known for his contributions to the development of DNA-PAINT, a super-resolution technique that uses short DNA strands to accurately label and locate specific molecules within a sample, leading to new insights into the structure and function of cells.

== Awards and honours ==
- 2016 ERC Starting Grant - MolMap
- 2020 ERC Consolidator - ReceptorPAINT
