= International Max Planck Research School for Molecular and Cellular Life Sciences =

School in Germany

The International Max Planck Research School for Molecules of Life (short: IMPRS-ML) is a German centre for postgraduate training and research in life sciences. It is one among over 60 International Max Planck Research Schools in Germany. It is located in Munich and was established in 2005. The Ph.D. program is operated by the Max Planck Institute of Biochemistry and works in close collaboration with the Max Planck Institute for Biological Intelligence and two universities in Munich.

== International Max Planck Research Schools ==
To date more than 60 International Max Planck Research Schools (short: IMPRS) have been established in Germany, each representing a joint cooperative of Max Planck Institutes and one or several German universities. The concept for the International Max Planck Research Schools was jointly developed in 1999 by the Max Planck Society and the so-called Hochschul Rektoren Konferenz (HRK), a body representing all German universities. The aim of these PhD programs is to offer German and international doctoral students a first class education in innovative and interdisciplinary research environments with facilities and research projects. Each International Max Planck Research School covers a specific topic in one of the following areas: chemistry, physics & technology, biology & medicine or human sciences. In contrast to traditional doctoral education in Germany where a doctoral student is trained and supervised individually by a professor or group leader, Max Planck Research Schools offer structured programs with a defined curriculum and a supervision by a committee of normally 3 or more expert scientists. Language of instruction is English. German language courses are provided to interested international students. In order to maintain the highest educational standards, all IMPRS programs are evaluated on a regular basis by an international and independent scientific commission.

== International Max Planck Research School for Molecules of Life (IMPRS-ML) ==
The International Max Planck Research School for Molecules of Life (short: IMPRS-ML) was established in 2005. The research oriented PhD program is operated by the Max Planck Institute of Biochemistry and works in close collaboration with the Max Planck Institute for Biological Intelligence and two of Germany's leading universities, LMU Munich and the Technical University of Munich. Over 30 research groups from the Munich area participate in the program, covering many aspects of life sciences including biochemistry, structural biology, biophysics, cell biology, systems biology and computational biology.

IMPRS-ML is 100% committed to basic research and aims to address fundamental questions in the following research areas:

- Biochemistry
- Biophysics
- Bio-imaging
- Computational Biology
- Gene Regulation
- Immunobiology
- Proteomics
- Structural Biology
- Signaling
- Systems Biology

Although students specialize in a particular research topic, the interdisciplinary context of the program facilitates interactions with other research groups and fosters the ability of cross-frontier thinking. Laboratory work is supplemented by seminars, summer schools, elective courses, training in soft skills and participation in national or international conferences. Currently, more than 200 doctoral students are enrolled in IMPRS-ML and approximately 50% of those come from abroad (Germany: 50%, Europe: 30%, Overseas: 20%)

Annually, 30 to 40 doctoral students from all over the world are accepted to the program. Deadline for application at the end of October, each year. All doctoral students receive a fellowship covering living expenses and tuition. Entry requirement is a MSc degree (or equivalent) in the fields of biology, biochemistry, bioinformatics, biophysics, biotechnology, or in a related discipline. The doctoral degree is usually awarded by one of the two participating Munich universities. International doctoral students may also obtain their doctoral degree from a university residing in their home country.

Currently, more than 250 doctoral students from all over the world are working at the Max Planck Institutes of Biochemistry and Biological Intelligence, together with numerous doctoral students from close by university laboratories. Among other activities, graduate students organize a regular social get together, a seminar series, and <interact>, an annual student symposium.

== See also ==
- Max Planck Institute of Biochemistry
- Max Planck Institute for Biological Intelligence
- LMU Munich
- Technical University of Munich
