= Peter Richardson (engineer) =

British biomedical engineer and academic (1935–2020)

Professor Peter Richardson FCGI, FRS
- Born: Peter Damian Richardson; 22 August 1935; West Wickham, Kent, England
- Died: 21 April 2020 (aged 84); Providence, Rhode Island
- Resting place: Swan Point Cemetery
- Education: Imperial College London

Professor Peter Damian Richardson FCGI, FRS (1935–2020) was a British biomedical engineer and academic.

He studied at Imperial College London, on a scholarship awarded to him at the age of 16.

He was appointed Professor of Engineering and Physiology at Brown University in 1984, becoming Emeritus upon retirement. He was elected a Fellow of the Royal Society in 1986, and was awarded a Humboldt Prize in 1976, and the Ernst Jung Prize in Medicine in 1986.
