= David E. Kuhl =

American scientist (1929–2017)

David Edmund Kuhl
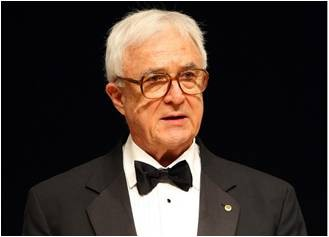
- David Kuhl in 2009 at the presentation of the Japan Prize Award
- Born: October 27, 1929; St. Louis, Missouri, U.S.
- Died: May 28, 2017 (aged 87); Ann Arbor, Michigan, U.S.
- Education: University of Pennsylvania School of Medicine
- Known for: positron emission tomography
- Awards: Ernst Jung Prize (1981); Japan Prize (2009)
- Scientific career
- Fields: radiology;nuclear medicine
- Workplaces: University of Pennsylvania; University of Michigan

David Edmund Kuhl (October 27, 1929 in St. Louis, Missouri – May 28, 2017 in Ann Arbor, Michigan) was an American scientist specializing in nuclear medicine. He was well known for his pioneering work in positron emission tomography. Dr. Kuhl served as the Chief of the Division of Nuclear Medicine at the University of Michigan for 20 years and retired in June 2011.

== Education and career ==
He obtained M.D.from University of Pennsylvania School of Medicine in 1955 and then completed his residency at Hospital of the University of Pennsylvania in 1962. During his time at Penn he developed a new method of tomographic imaging and constructed several tomographic instruments. These tomographic imaging techniques he invented were further developed in the 1970s and now called positron emission tomography or PET.

He joined the University of Michigan Medical School faculty in 1986 and worked to develop the use of FDG metabolism scanning in human brains. During his time as Chief of the Division of Nuclear Medicine and Director of the Center for Positron Emission Tomography, the University of Michigan became one of the first US institutions to offer clinical diagnostic PET services.

His discoveries and clinical translations helped lead to the routine clinical use of PET in neurology, cardiology and oncology in the US and worldwide.

== Honors ==
- 1976 Nuclear Pioneer (awarded by the Society of Nuclear Medicine)
- 1981 Ernst Jung Prize
- 2001 Kettering Prize
- 2009 Japan Prize
