= Stephen G. Young =

American physician-scientist

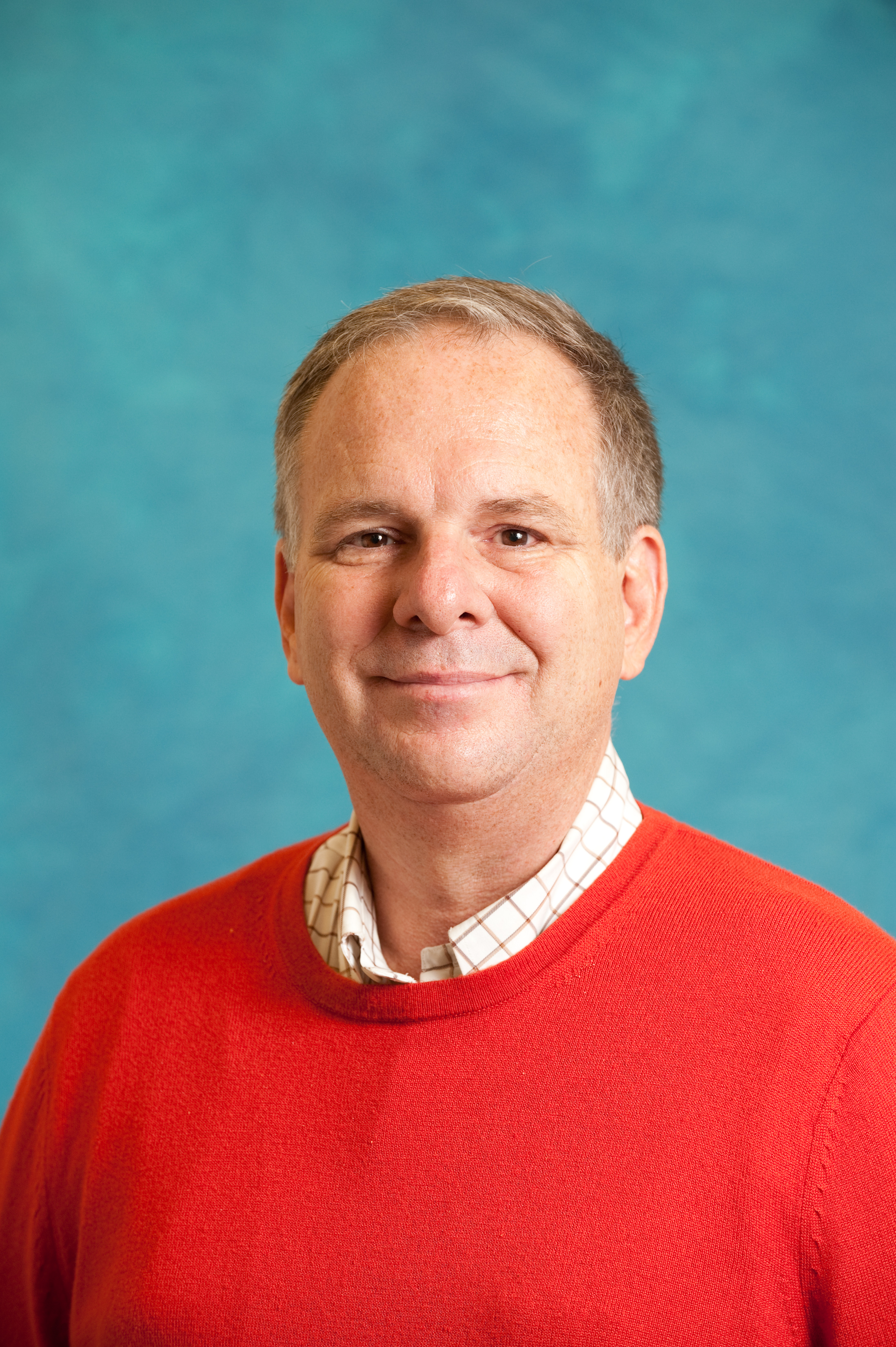
Young in 2009

Stephen G. Young (born 1952) is an American physician-scientist known for investigating the human genetics and molecular physiology of apolipoprotein B, the intravascular lipolytic processing of triglyceride-rich lipoproteins by the lipoprotein lipase–GPIHBP1 complex, and the role of nuclear lamin proteins in health and disease. Currently, he is a Distinguished Professor of Medicine and Human Genetics at UCLA and works closely with two faculty colleagues (Loren G. Fong and Anne P. Beigneux). He studied history at Princeton University and obtained a medical degree from Washington University in St. Louis. He trained in internal medicine at UCSF and cardiovascular diseases at UCSD; he is board-certified in both disciplines. He is an elected member of the National Academy of Sciences, the American Society for Clinical Investigation, and the Association of American Physicians. He is a recipient of the Ernst Jung Prize in Medicine and received an honorary doctorate in medicine from the University of Gothenburg in Sweden.
