= Lorenz E. Zimmerman =

Lorenz Zimmerman
- Born: Lorenz Eugene Zimmerman; November 15, 1920; Washington, D.C.
- Died: March 16, 2013 (aged 93); Towson, Maryland
- Education: George Washington University (BS, MD)
- Occupation: Ophthalmic Pathologist
- Children: 6

Lorenz Eugene Zimmerman (November 15, 1920 – March 16, 2013) was an American ophthalmologist and an ophthalmic pathologist.

== Early life and education ==
Zimmerman was born in Washington, D.C. He received his bachelor's degree from George Washington University in 1943 and his M.D. from the George Washington University School of Medicine & Health Sciences in 1945.

== Career ==
After completing his residency in general pathology at Walter Reed Army Medical Center, he was commissioned in 1950 as commanding officer of the 8217th Mobile Medical Laboratory in Korea. For his wartime service, he received the Bronze Star and the Legion of Merit. In 1952 he was assigned to the Armed Forces Institute of Pathology, where he remained until his retirement in 2002 as emeritus chair of the institute's department of ophthalmic pathology. He was also an associate professor from 1954 to 1963 and from 1963 a full professor of ophthalmology at George Washington University. From 1983 he was a professor of ophthalmology and pathology at Georgetown University.

== Personal life ==
Zimmerman first married to Lou Annette Robinson, which ended in divorce. During that marriage, they had five children, Spencer E. Zimmerman of New Bern, N.C., Patricia A. Kloke of Richmond and Brian L. Zimmerman of Chester, Va. Zimmerman died in Towson, Maryland in 2013.

== Awards and honors ==
- 1976 — Ernst Jung Prize for Medicine of the Jung Foundation for Science and Research
- 1978 — Donders Medal of the Netherlands Ophthalmological Society
- 1999 — Helen Keller Prize for Vision Research of the Helen Keller Foundation
- 1999 — Lucien Howe Medal of the American Ophthalmological Society
- 2006 — Laureate Recognition Award of the American Academy of Ophthalmology

== Selected publications ==
- with Michael J. Hogan: Ophthalmic Pathology. 2nd edition, Saunders, Philadelphia 1962; 797 pages.
