= Helmut Sies =

German biomedical research professor

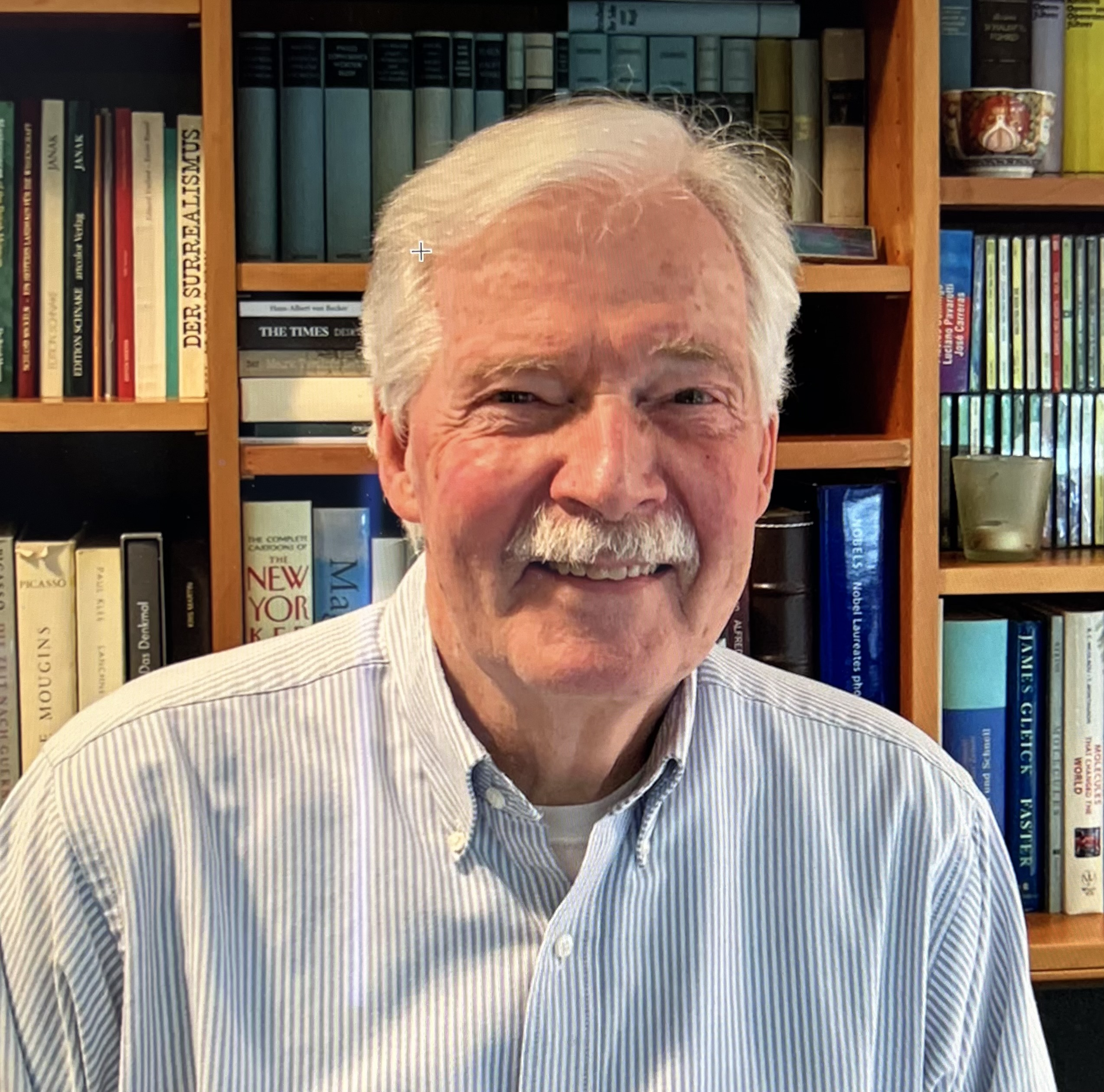

Helmut Sies is a German physician, biochemist and university professor. He was the first to demonstrate the existence of hydrogen peroxide as a normal attribute of aerobic life in 1970, and he introduced the concept of Oxidative stress in 1985. He also worked on the biological strategies of antioxidant defense and the biochemistry of nutritional antioxidants (e.g., selenium, carotenoids, flavonoids, polyphenols).

== Personal ==
Professor Sies was born March 28, 1942, in Goslar, Germany. He grew up in Seesen/Harz, Germany, attended Elementary School 1948-1952, and Gymnasium (Jacobson School) 1952-1961. He was a High School Exchange student (1959-1960) with the Michigan Council of Churches, in Pleasant Plain, Ohio, and in Kankakee, Illinois, where he graduated from Kankakee High School in 1960. He was married to Dr. Claudia Sies, born Neumann, (1967-1983). They have two children (Alexander, Art Gallerist (www.sieshoeke.com); Caroline). He is married to Dr. Nancy Sies, born Kim (born 1990), they also have two children (Katharina, MD; Audrey).

== Career ==
He was a student at Leibniz-Kolleg at Tübingen for 'studium generale' in 1961. He studied medicine at the University of Tübingen, LMU Munich, and in Paris. In 1967, he received his medical doctorate summa cum laude at Munich, where he worked at the Institute of Physiological Chemistry from 1968. In 1972, he habilitated in Munich for Physiological Chemistry and Physical Biochemistry with the thesis, "Biochemistry of the Peroxisome in the Liver Cell", and in 1978 became professor. From 1979 until 2008 he was professor and chairman at the Institute of Biochemistry and Molecular Biology I, Heinrich_Heine_University_Düsseldorf. He has been a visiting professor at the University of California at Berkeley, the University of Texas at Austin the Heart Research Institute in Sydney, the University of Siena, the University of Southern California, and the King Saud University in Riyadh. Since 2008 he is emeritus professor at the Institute of Biochemistry and Molecular Biology I, Heinrich Heine University Düsseldorf, and Senior Scientist at the Leibniz Institute for Environmental Medicine, Düsseldorf, Germany.

Investigating biological redox reactions, he identified hydrogen peroxide as a normal constituent of aerobic life in eukaryotic cells. This finding led to developments that recognized the essential role of hydrogen peroxide in metabolic redox control. Further research included studies on glutathione, toxicological aspects (the concept of "redox cycling"), biochemical pharmacology (Ebselen), nutritional biochemistry and micronutrients (selenium, carotenoids, flavonoids), and the concept of "Oxidative Stress".

He found that Lycopene, a carotenoid common in tomatoes, works as an antioxidant by quenching singlet molecular oxygen, and that lycopene and other carotenoids, as well as some flavonoids, protect the skin from damage from sunlight. Working with clinicians, he found that cocoa flavanols are beneficial for the cardiovascular system.

He pointed out that epidemiology can generate interest for further analysis, but that epidemiological association of parameters cannot prove cause-effect relationships. The striking example was the almost perfect correlation (r = 0.982) between the number of brooding storks and the number of newborn babies in then West Germany: every child in Germany knows that 'storks bring babies'!

He was named "Redox Pioneer".

== Awards ==
- 2022 Honorary Member, German Society for Biochemistry and Molecular Biology
- 2021 Fellow of the American Society for Nutrition
- 2020 Foreign Member of the Polish Academy of Arts and Sciences, Krakow
- 2019 Copernicus Medal, University of Ferrara, Italy
- 2013 Linus Pauling Institute Prize for Health Research
- 2001 NFCR Fellow, National Foundation for Cancer Research, Bethesda, USA
- 2001 Fellow, Royal College of Physicians, London (FRCP)
- 2000 Member, German National Academy of Sciences Leopoldina
- 1999 Werner Heisenberg-Medal of the Alexander von Humboldt Foundation
- 1996 Corresponding Member, Academy of Medicine Buenos Aires, Argentina
- 1991 Member, North Rhine-Westphalian Academy of Sciences, Humanities and the Arts
- 1991 Corresponding Member, Heidelberg Academy of Sciences and Humanities
- 1990 Claudius Galenus Prize
- 1988 Honorary Member, American Society for Biochemistry and Molecular Biology
- 1988 Ernst Jung Prize for Medicine
- 1986 Silver Medal of the Karolinska Institute, Stockholm

== Roles ==
- 2009-2011 Vice-President, Council for the Lindau Nobel Laureate Meetings
- 2004-2008 President, Oxygen Club of California (OCC)
- 2003-2005 Vice-President, Union of German Academies of Sciences and Humanities
- 2002-2005 President, North Rhine-Westphalian Academy of Sciences, Humanities and the Arts
- 1998-2000 President, International Society for Free Radical Research (SFRRI)
- 1991-2009 Member, UNESCO Global Network for Molecular and Cell Biology
- 1985-2010 Chairman, Krebsforschung International e.V.
- 1984-2000 Member, Advisory Committee, Gesellschaft für Biologische Chemie
