= Francis V. Chisari =

American physician

Francis "Frank" Vincent Chisari (born 5 April 1942 in New York City) is a physician, experimental pathologist, and viral immunologist, known for his research on virus-host interactions and disease pathogenesis during hepatitis B and hepatitis C virus infections.

== Education and career ==
Chisari earned a bachelor's degree in biology from Fordham University in 1963 and an M.D. from Weill Cornell Medical College in 1968. His postgraduate training included an internship in Internal Medicine at New York Hospital (1968–69), residency in Anatomic Pathology at the Mayo Clinic (1969–70), a staff associate position in immunopathology at the NIH (1970–1972), residency in internal medicine at Dartmouth-Hitchcock Medical Center (1972–73), and a postdoctoral research fellowship in immunopathology at Scripps Clinic and Research Foundation (1973–1975). He joined the Scripps Faculty as an Assistant Professor (1975–1981), progressing to Associate Professor (1981–1988) during which he spent a sabbatical year (1983–1984) as a Fogarty Scholar in molecular biology at the Institut Pasteur, and Full Professor from 1988 until retiring as Professor Emeritus in 2015.

During his tenure at Scripps, Chisari's NIH-funded research focused on the immunological basis for viral clearance and disease pathogenesis during acute and persistent hepatitis B virus (HBV) and hepatitis C virus (HCV) infections; the signaling pathways and effector molecules that mediate these effects; and the viral evasion strategies that subvert them. His laboratory developed cellular and animal models of HBV and HCV infection and performed foundational studies elucidating the T-cell response to these viruses in infected humans, subhuman primates, and transgenic mice and the role that the immune system plays in the pathogenesis of virus induced inflammatory disease and in the development of virus induced cancer.

Chisari is best known for demonstrating that chronic immune-mediated injury and inflammation can cause liver cancer, and for discovering that antiviral T cells can purge viruses from infected cells by secreting antiviral cytokines that inhibit viral replication, thus controlling the infection while preserving the vital functions of the infected cells. Those studies established a new paradigm in viral pathogenesis and immunobiology which has informed the global pursuit of novel immunotherapeutic approaches for the prevention and treatment of chronic HBV and other viral infections.

In the HCV arena, his laboratory: developed a cell culture system capable of supporting the entire HCV life cycle; identified a novel mechanism for viral spread via exosomal delivery of HCV genomic RNA from infected hepatocytes to uninfected hepatocytes masked by the exosome from detection by antiviral antibodies; and they discovered that HCV genomic RNA-containing exosomes can trigger an innate host response by activating plasmacytoid dendritic cells to produce antiviral cytokines that can suppress viral spread.

In addition to his basic research, from 1988 to 2004 Chisari served as Director of an NIH-funded General Clinical Research Center where he and other Scripps scientists and clinicians performed a wide variety of peer-reviewed clinical studies of patients with viral infections, autoimmune diseases, neurological diseases, sleep disorders, metabolic diseases and cancer. Dr. Chisari also served as an Associate Editor for The American Journal of Pathology from July of 1992 through December of 1996.

Chisari has lectured widely internationally; he has served on the editorial boards of several distinguished scientific journals; and he holds numerous patents on the use of viral peptide epitopes to treat and to prevent chronic hepatitis-B and hepatitis-C virus infections. In recognition of his contributions, Chisari has received numerous honors and awards, including those listed below.

== Awards and honors ==
- 1962 Elected Member, Phi Beta Kappa national academic honor society
- 1967 Elected Member, Alpha Omega Alpha national medical honor society
- 1976 Research Career Development Award, National Institutes of Health
- 1983 Fogarty Senior International Fellowship, National Institutes of Health
- 1984 International Scholar, Fondation pour la Recherche Médicale, Paris
- 1990 NIH Merit Award, National Institutes of Health
- 1992 Elected Member, Association of American Physicians
- 1996 Elected Fellow, American Association for the Advancement of Science
- 1997 Jung Prize for Medicine, Jung Foundation for Science and Research, Germany
- 1997 Distinguished Scientific Achievement Award, American Liver Foundation
- 1999 Rous-Whipple Award, American Society for Investigative Pathology
- 1999 Distinguished Achievement Award, American Association for Study of Liver Disease
- 1999 Distinguished Lecturer in Medical Sciences, Mayo Clinic
- 1999 Elected Member, The Henry Kunkel Society, New York
- 2002 Elected Fellow, the American Academy of Microbiology
- 2002 Elected Member, the United States National Academy of Sciences
- 2003 Elected Member, the United States National Academy of Medicine
- 2004 Distinguished Alumnus Award, Weill Cornell University Medical College
- 2007 Distinguished Scientist Award, Hepatitis B Foundation
- 2015 William H. Prusoff Lifetime Achievement Award
- 2017 First Distinguished Award in Hepatitis B Virus Research

== Selected publications ==
- Kapadia, S. B.; Chisari, F. V. (2005). "Hepatitis C virus RNA replication is regulated by host geranylgeranylation and fatty acids". Proceedings of the National Academy of Sciences of the United States of America. 102 (7): 2561–6. Bibcode:2005PNAS..102.2561K. doi:10.1073/pnas.0409834102. PMC 549027. PMID 15699349.
- Robek, M. D.; Boyd, B. S.; Chisari, F. V. (2005). "Lambda interferon inhibits hepatitis B and C virus replication". Journal of Virology. 79 (6): 3851–4. doi:10.1128/JVI.79.6.3851-3854.2005. PMC 1075734. PMID 15731279.
- Gilbert, R. J.; Beales, L.; Blond, D.; Simon, M. N.; Lin, B. Y.; Chisari, F. V.; Stuart, D. I.; Rowlands, D. J. (2005). "Hepatitis B small surface antigen particles are octahedral". Proceedings of the National Academy of Sciences of the United States of America. 102 (41): 14783–8. Bibcode:2005PNAS..10214783G. doi:10.1073/pnas.0505062102. PMC 1253561. PMID 16203986.
- Chisari, F. V. (2005). "Unscrambling hepatitis C virus-host interactions". Nature. 436 (7053): 930–2. Bibcode:2005Natur.436..930C. doi:10.1038/nature04076. PMID 16107831. S2CID 24837913. Cited in PMC
- Wieland, S. F.; Chisari, F. V. (2005). "Stealth and cunning: Hepatitis B and hepatitis C viruses". Journal of Virology. 79 (15): 9369–80. doi:10.1128/JVI.79.15.9369-9380.2005. PMC 1181548. PMID 16014900. Free full text Cited in PMC
- Wieland, S. F.; Eustaquio, A.; Whitten-Bauer, C.; Boyd, B.; Chisari, F. V. (2005). "Interferon prevents formation of replication-competent hepatitis B virus RNA-containing nucleocapsids". Proceedings of the National Academy of Sciences of the United States of America. 102 (28): 9913–7. Bibcode:2005PNAS..102.9913W. doi:10.1073/pnas.0504273102. PMC 1175012. PMID 15994231.
- Bukh, J.; Thimme, R.; Meunier, J. C.; Faulk, K.; Spangenberg, H. C.; Chang, K. M.; Satterfield, W.; Chisari, F. V.; Purcell, R. H. (2008). "Previously infected chimpanzees are not consistently protected against reinfection or persistent infection after reexposure to the identical hepatitis C virus strain". Journal of Virology. 82 (16): 8183–95. doi:10.1128/JVI.00142-08. PMC 2519567. PMID 18550671.
- Bobardt, M. D.; Cheng, G.; De Witte, L.; Selvarajah, S.; Chatterji, U.; Sanders-Beer, B. E.; Geijtenbeek, T. B.; Chisari, F. V.; Gallay, P. A. (2008). "Hepatitis C virus NS5A anchor peptide disrupts human immunodeficiency virus". Proceedings of the National Academy of Sciences of the United States of America. 105 (14): 5525–30. Bibcode:2008PNAS..105.5525B. doi:10.1073/pnas.0801388105. PMC 2291127. PMID 18378908.
- Asabe, S.; Wieland, S. F.; Chattopadhyay, P. K.; Roederer, M.; Engle, R. E.; Purcell, R. H.; Chisari, F. V. (2009). "The size of the viral inoculum contributes to the outcome of hepatitis B virus infection". Journal of Virology. 83 (19): 9652–62. doi:10.1128/JVI.00867-09. PMC 2748002. PMID 19625407.
- Takahashi, K.; Asabe, S.; Wieland, S.; Garaigorta, U.; Gastaminza, P.; Isogawa, M.; Chisari, F. V. (2010). "Plasmacytoid dendritic cells sense hepatitis C virus-infected cells, produce interferon, and inhibit infection". Proceedings of the National Academy of Sciences of the United States of America. 107 (16): 7431–6. doi:10.1073/pnas.1002301107. PMC 2867703. PMID 20231459.
- Bissig, K. D.; Wieland, S. F.; Tran, P.; Isogawa, M.; Le, T. T.; Chisari, F. V.; Verma, I. M. (2010). "Human liver chimeric mice provide a model for hepatitis B and C virus infection and treatment". The Journal of Clinical Investigation. 120 (3): 924–30. doi:10.1172/JCI40094. PMC 2827952. PMID 20179355.
- Gastaminza, P.; Whitten-Bauer, C.; Chisari, F. V. (2010). "Unbiased probing of the entire hepatitis C virus life cycle identifies clinical compounds that target multiple aspects of the infection". Proceedings of the National Academy of Sciences of the United States of America. 107 (1): 291–6. Bibcode:2010PNAS..107..291G. doi:10.1073/pnas.0912966107. PMC 2806752. PMID 19995961.
- Bandi, P.; Garcia, M. L.; Booth, C. J.; Chisari, F. V.; Robek, M. D. (2010). "Bortezomib inhibits hepatitis B virus replication in transgenic mice". Antimicrobial Agents and Chemotherapy. 54 (2): 749–56. doi:10.1128/AAC.01101-09. PMC 2812171. PMID 19949053.
- Yang, P. L.; Althage, A.; Chung, J.; Maier, H.; Wieland, S.; Isogawa, M.; Chisari, F. V. (2010). "Immune effectors required for hepatitis B virus clearance". Proceedings of the National Academy of Sciences of the United States of America. 107 (2): 798–802. Bibcode:2010PNAS..107..798Y. doi:10.1073/pnas.0913498107. PMC 2818933. PMID 20080755.
- Asabe, S.; Wieland, S. F.; Chattopadhyay, P. K.; Roederer, M.; Engle, R. E.; Purcell, R. H.; Chisari, F. V. (2009). "The size of the viral inoculum contributes to the outcome of hepatitis B virus infection". Journal of Virology. 83 (19): 9652–62. doi:10.1128/JVI.00867-09. PMC 2748002. PMID 19625407.
- Chisari, F. V.; Isogawa, M.; Wieland, S. F. (2010). "Pathogenesis of hepatitis B virus infection". Pathologie-Biologie. 58 (4): 258–66. doi:10.1016/j.patbio.2009.11.001. PMC 2888709. PMID 20116937.
- Dreux, M.; Chisari, F. V. (2011). "Impact of the autophagy machinery on hepatitis C virus infection". Viruses. 3 (8): 1342–57. doi:10.3390/v3081342. PMC 3185811. PMID 21994783.
- Chisari, F. V.; García-Sastre, A. (2011). "Pioneers of pathogenesis: Past and present". Current Opinion in Virology. 1 (3): 157–9. doi:10.1016/j.coviro.2011.06.006. PMID 22440715.
- Guidotti, L. G.; Isogawa, M.; Chisari, F. V. (2015). "Host-virus interactions in hepatitis B virus infection". Current Opinion in Immunology. 36: 61–6. doi:10.1016/j.coi.2015.06.016. PMC 4593767. PMID 26186123.
- Revill, P. A.; Chisari, F. V.; Block, J. M.; Dandri, M.; Gehring, A. J.; Guo, H.; Hu, J.; Kramvis, A.; Lampertico, P.; Janssen HLA; Levrero, M.; Li, W.; Liang, T. J.; Lim, S. G.; Lu, F.; Penicaud, M. C.; Tavis, J. E.; Thimme, R.; Members of the ICE-HBV Working Groups; ICE-HBV Stakeholders Group Chairs; ICE-HBV Senior Advisors; Zoulim, F. (2019). "A global scientific strategy to cure hepatitis B". The Lancet. Gastroenterology & Hepatology. 4 (7): 545–558. doi:10.1016/S2468-1253(19)30119-0. PMC 6732795. PMID 30981686.
- Alter, H. J.; Chisari, F. V. (2019). "Is Elimination of Hepatitis B and C a Pipe Dream or Reality?". Gastroenterology. 156 (2): 294–296. doi:10.1053/j.gastro.2018.12.015. PMID 30593764.
