= Friedrich Stelzner =

German surgeon (1921–2020)

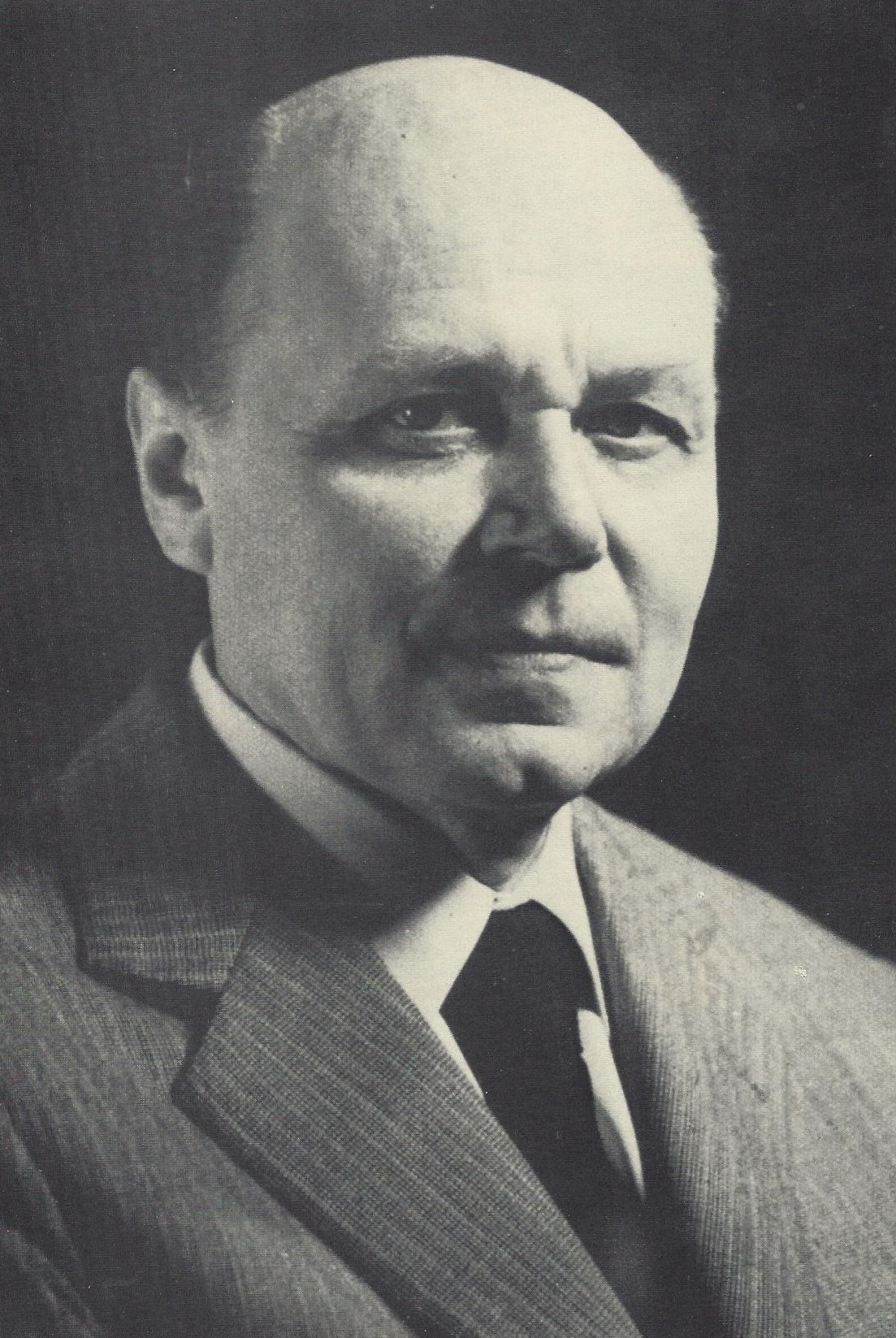
Friedrich Stelzner

Friedrich Stelzner (4 November 1921 – 5 June 2020) was a German academic surgeon, scientist and educator with specialization in gastrointestinal surgery. He served consecutively as Professor and Chairman of three university departments and was inducted as President of the German Society for Surgery in 1985. Stelzner contributed more than 80 books and book chapters to the literature and authored over 450 publications and presentations. Throughout his scientific career, Stelzner investigated questions of functional anatomy and its impact on surgical operative methods.

== Childhood and education ==
Friedrich Stelzner was born in Františkovy Lázně, Sudetenland, Czechoslovakia, on 4 November 1921, the only son of the railway official Georg Stelzner (1889–1959) and his wife Helene Brandner (1895–1969). Stelzner's mother Helene came from the nearby town of Cheb, where her father was a master craftsman.

Friedrich Stelzner spent the first years of his life in Františkovy Lázně and attended secondary school in Cheb. Subsequently, he attended medical school in Berlin, Würzburg, Giessen and Munich and graduated Summa cum laude in 1945. Stelzner soon after began his surgical residency at the University of Erlangen, where he was boarded in General Surgery in 1949. Three years later, he was appointed as a Private docent based on a thesis that focused on the radical removal of rectal cancer with preservation of anal continence function.

== 1955–1967: Member of the Surgical Faculty at the University of Hamburg ==
Following advice from his mentor Otto Goetze in Erlangen, Stelzner joined the surgical faculty at the University of Hamburg in 1955. He received a scholarship from the British Council to complete additional training in colorectal surgery at London's St Mark's Hospital. The collaboration with leading colorectal surgeons in Britain left a strong impression on Stelzner and strengthened his desire to specialize in this field. Inspired by the experience, Stelzner wrote the first edition of his standard work on anorectal fistulas. For this monograph, Stelzner was awarded the Langenbeck prize, the highest scientific award of the German Society for Surgery in 1960. In collaboration with the anatomist Jochen Staubesand, Stelzner investigated the exact structure of the hemorrhoidal vessels. He demonstrated that hemorrhoids are not enlarged venous structures, but rather arteriovenous cushions for which he coined the term corpus cavernosum recti. These cushions have great importance for the anal continence. Stelzner also developed the concept of anorectal continence organ. He pointed out that this organ shows significant differences in males and females. This has bearing on the details and the outcome of anorectal surgical procedures. Further studies revealed the spiral structure of the esophageal wall muscles. Stelzner worked with the anatomist Werner Lierse in these studies and made use of translucent muscular preparations and serial sections of esophagi, which were processed in situ. Knowledge of the exact structure of the muscular wall of the esophagus forms the basis of surgical procedures for treatment of achalasia and gastroesophageal reflux disease.

== 1967–1987: Professor and Chairman of Surgery ==
In 1967, Stelzner was offered to head the surgical department of the University of Tübingen. However, around the same time, the chair position in Hamburg became vacant and was offered to him as well. Stelzner accepted the latter position and was appointed as professor and chairman at the University Hospital Hamburg-Eppendorf in 1968. Already two years later, Stelzner accepted the chair at the surgical department of the University of Frankfurt. Here he developed a close collaboration with the department chair for comparative anatomy, Dietrich Starck, with whom he identified the enveloping fascias of the rectum and of the neck. These serve as important lead structures for the radical removal of malignant tumors. Further studies (again with Werner Lierse) described the morphological bases of appendicitis and diverticulitis. In 1976, Stelzner received simultaneous offers to chair the surgical departments of the universities of Vienna and Bonn and Stelzner decided to assume the department leadership in Bonn. A number of morphological studies from this period focus on the causes of pilonidal sinus disease and of tract-forming suppurative hidradenitis as well the embryology and function of the pelvic structures. In 1985, Stelzner became President of the German Society for Surgery.

== From 1987: Professor Emeritus ==
Stelzner announced his retirement in 1987, but he led the university hospital for another two years until his successor took office in 1989. In the following years, Stelzner continued to perform minor surgical operations. After 1995, he was no longer active as a clinical surgeon. However, his main focus was henceforth on his scientific work. A major innovation was Stelzner's application of PET-CT to visualize and study the spontaneous activity of gastrointestinal sphincter systems. Other work established the existence of two separate lymphatic systems, which are located beneath the epithelia and deeply in the mesenchyme.

He died in June 2020 at the age of 98.

== Awards and honors ==
- Langenbeck prize, the highest scientific award of the German Society for Surgery (1960)
- Honorary doctorate of the University of Seoul (1983)
- President of the German Society for Surgery (1985)
- Honorary doctorate of LMU Munich (1987)
- Member of the German Academy of Sciences Leopoldina (1987)
- Officer's Cross, Order of Merit of the Federal Republic of Germany (1993)
- Ernst Jung Gold Medal for Medicine (1997, Ernst Jung Foundation)

== Books (selection) ==
- The radical resection of rectal cancer with preservation of anorectal continence. Erlangen (Habilitation) (1952)
- The anorectal fistulas. Springer, 3rd Edition, Berlin 1981, ISBN 3-540-10775-4.
- Proctology. Henning Hansen. Second Edition. Springer, Berlin 1987, ISBN 3-540-17507-5.
- Perianal fistulas. with Henning Hansen. Urban and Vogel, Munich 2011, ISBN 978-3-89935-266-5.

== Autobiography ==
- Waves and breakers in the life of a surgeon. (in German), Ecomed, Heidelberg 1998, ISBN 3-609-51630-5.
