= Stefanie Dimmeler =

German academic (born 1967)

- Born: 18 July 1967 (age 59); Ravensburg, West Germany
- Education: University of Konstanz
- Awards: Ernst Jung Prize (2007); Gottfried Wilhelm Leibniz Prize
- Scientific career
- Fields: Biology, Biochemistry
- Workplaces: University of Frankfurt

Stefanie Dimmeler (born 18 July 1967) is a German biologist specializing in the pathophysiological processes underlying cardiovascular diseases. Her awards and honours include the Gottfried Wilhelm Leibniz Prize of the German Research Foundation for her work on the programmed cell death of endothelial cells. Since 2008 she has led the Institute for Cardiovascular Regeneration at the University of Frankfurt. Her current work is focusing to develop cellular and pharmacological strategies to improve cardiovascular repair and regeneration. Her work aims to establish non-coding RNAs as novel therapeutic targets.

== Life ==
Dimmeler attended schools in Hagnau and Stetten and the high school in Markdorf. From 1986 to 1991 she studied biology at the University of Konstanz. In 1993 she obtained her doctorate in Konstanz on "Nitric oxide-stimulated ADP-ribosylation". From 1993 to 1995 Dimmeler was a postdoctoral fellow in the Biochemical and Experimental Division of the Department of Surgery the University of Cologne and then from 1995 to 2001 in the Medical Clinic, Department of Cardiology, the University of Frankfurt am Main. In 1998 she habilitated in the field of experimental medicine on the topic of endothelial dysfunction in atherosclerosis – studies on the apoptosis of endothelial cells. Since 2001 she has been Professor for Molecular Cardiology at the University of Frankfurt and since 2008 she is the Director of the Institute for Cardiovascular Regeneration at the Center for Molecular Medicine of the Goethe University Frankfurt. in 2005 she won the 1.55 million euro Gottfried Wilhelm Leibniz Prize. Dimmeler went on to receive the Ernst Jung Prize for Medicine in 2007 and >2.4 million euro research grants from the European Research Council in 2008 and 2015.

In 2020, Dimmeler was elected as Chairwomen of the "German Center for Cardiovascular Research e.V." (DZHK). The DZHK is a partner of the German Centers for Health Research, which are committed to improving the prevention, diagnosis and treatment of common diseases and was founded in 2011 on the initiative of the Federal Ministry of Education and Research. The goal of all six German Centers for Health Research is to bring the results of basic research into clinical application more quickly.

In addition, Dimmeler is spokeswoman for the "Cardio-Pulmonary Institute", a DFG-funded Excellence Cluster .

== Scientific work ==
Dimmeler authored more than 470 publications. Her group elucidates the basic mechanisms underlying cardiovascular disease and vessel growth with the aim to develop new cellular and pharmacological therapies for improving the treatment of cardiovascular disease. Ongoing research focuses on RNA based and cellular mechanisms that control cardiovascular repair. She is among the “Thomson Reuters Highly Cited Researcher” since 2014.

== Awards ==
- 2022: Otto Warburg Medal, German Society of Biochemistry and Molecular Biology (GBM)
- 2021: Paul-Morawitz-Preis, German Society of Cardiology (DGK)
- 2020: Gold Medal of the European Society of Cardiology (ESC)
- 2018: Selby Travelling Fellowship of the Australian Academy of Science
- 2017: Member of the German Academy for Science Leopoldina
- 2017: Willy Pitzer Award, Bad Nauheim
- 2016: Paul Dudley White Lecture at the Scientific Session of the AHA
- 2016: Michael Oliver Memorial Lecture of the British Atherosclerosis Society
- 2015: Thomas W. Smith Memorial Lecture Award
- 2014-2018: Thomson Reuters "Highly Cited Researcher" 2014, 2015, 2016 and 2018
- 2014: Madrid Award for Cardiovascular Stem Cell Therapy
- 2010: Life Achievement Award by Dutch-German Molecular Cardiology Working Groups
- 2008: Research Award of the GlaxoSmithKline Foundation Science4Life Award 2008
- 2007: Ernst Jung Prize for Medicine 2007
- 2006: Karl-Landsteiner Lecture, German Association for Transfusion Medicine & Immunhematology
- 2006: Basic Science Lecture and Silver Medal of the European Society of Cardiology
- 2006: FEBS Anniversary Prize 2006
- 2005: George E. Brown Memorial Lecture at the Scientific Session of the AHA
- 2005: Leibniz Award of the Deutsche Forschungsgemeinschaft (DFG)
- 2004: Forssmann Award 2004
- 2002: Alfried Krupp-Award 2002
- 2000: Award of the German Cardiac Society (Fraenkel-Preis)
- 1999: Award of the Herbert and Hedwig Eckelmann-Foundation
- 1998: Award of the German Heart Foundation
- 1994: Fritz-Külz-Award of the German Association of Pharmacology and Toxicology
- 1991: Foundation of German Sciences, Award
