= Brenda Schulman =

American biochemist

Brenda A. Schulman
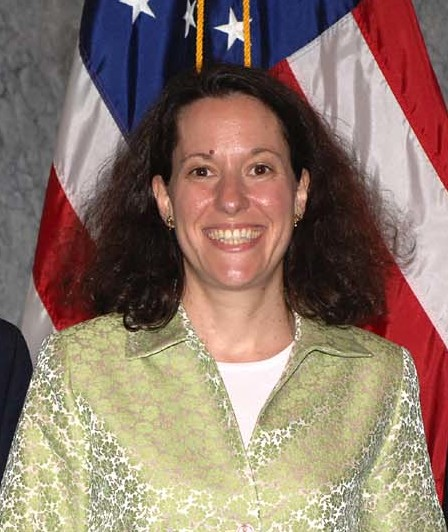
- Schulman in 2005
- Born: Tucson, Arizona
- Education: Johns Hopkins University (BS); Massachusetts Institute of Technology (PhD)
- Scientific career
- Fields: Biochemistry
- Workplaces: Max Planck Institute of Biochemistry
- Doctoral advisor: Peter S. Kim

Brenda Arlene Schulman is an American biochemist and structural biologist who is a Director at the Max Planck Institute of Biochemistry, Martinsried, Bavaria. Schulman's research interests focus on a class of proteins known as ubiquitin-like proteins.

== Education and academic career ==
Schulman is a native of Tucson, Arizona. Schulman received her bachelor's degree in biology from Johns Hopkins University in 1989 and her PhD in biology from the Massachusetts Institute of Technology in 1996, advised by Peter S. Kim. She then worked as a postdoctoral fellow with Ed Harlow at the Massachusetts General Hospital Cancer Center and later with Nikola Pavletich at the Memorial Sloan Kettering Cancer Center.

Schulman joined the faculty at the St. Jude Children's Research Hospital in 2001 and assumed the Joseph Simone Endowed Chair of Basic Research there in 2014. She became a Howard Hughes Medical Institute Investigator in 2005. She was elected to the American Academy of Arts and Sciences in 2012 and to the National Academy of Sciences in 2014. After sixteen years at St. Jude's, Schulman moved to the Max Planck Institute in 2017.

== Research ==
Schulman's research career has focused on the effects of post-translational modifications on the regulation of proteins in eukaryotic cells. Her work has been particularly influential in characterizing ubiquitin-like proteins (UBLs), a class of proteins that are similar to ubiquitin, such as NEDD8. She has also extensively studied enzymes that for which ubiquitin and UBLs are substrates, particularly the E3 ubiquitin ligases.

== Honors and awards ==
- 2014 Election to member of the National Academy of Sciences of the US
- 2019 Ernst Jung Prize for Medicine
- 2019 Gottfried Wilhelm Leibniz Prize
- 2019 Member of the German Academy of Sciences Leopoldina.
- 2023 Louis-Jeantet Prize for Medicine
- 2026 Elected Fellow of the Royal Society
