= Karl-Friedrich Bonhoeffer =

German chemist (1899–1957)

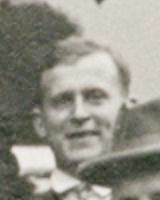
- May 1928 at Munich
- Born: 13 January 1899; Breslau, German Empire
- Died: 15 May 1957 (aged 58); Göttingen, West Germany
- Education: University of Tübingen; University of Berlin
- Known for: Spin isomers of hydrogen: orthohydrogen and parahydrogen
- Children: Friedrich Bonhoeffer
- Father: Karl Bonhoeffer
- Scientific career
- Fields: Chemistry
- Workplaces: Kaiser-Wilhelm-Institut for Physical and Electrochemistry; University of Leipzig; University of Berlin; Max Planck Institute for Biophysical Chemistry
- Doctoral advisor: Fritz Haber; Walther Nernst
- Doctoral students: Ladislaus Farkas; Heinz Gerischer; Albert Neuberger

Karl-Friedrich Bonhoeffer (13 January 1899 – 15 May 1957) was a German chemist.

== Biography ==
=== Family, education and early career ===
Born in Breslau, he was an older brother of martyred theologian Dietrich Bonhoeffer. His father was neurologist Karl Bonhoeffer and his mother was Paula von Hase.

Bonhoeffer studied from 1918 in Tübingen and Berlin, finishing his PhD in 1922 in Berlin with Walther Nernst. From 1923 to 1930 he was an assistant with Fritz Haber at Kaiser Wilhelm Institute for Physical Chemistry and Elektrochemistry in Berlin Dahlem. After the Habilitation in 1927, he became full professor at the University of Berlin. In 1930, Bonhoeffer was appointed a professor of Physical Chemistry at the University of Frankfurt. Four years later, he was appointed a professor of Physical Chemistry at the University of Leipzig.

In 1935, he was refused permission by the Reich Minister of Education Bernhard Rust to attend a Kaiser Wilhelm Society memorial for Fritz Haber, the "father of chemical warfare", who had died in exile after refusing to expel Jewish scientists from the Kaiser Wilhelm Institute for Physical Chemistry. This was the only organised public protest by scientists in Nazi Germany.

=== Involvement in the Nazi nuclear programme ===
Soon after the isolation of heavy water through electrolysis by Gilbert N. Lewis in the United States in 1933, Bonhoeffer suggested the production of heavy water to the Norwegian company Hydro, part-owned by IG Farben from 1927, and the process was launched in 1934. His Leipzig assistant Karl Wirtz also worked on heavy water at the time.

By February 1940, together with his friend and colleague Paul Harteck he was among the recipients of Werner Heisenberg's early report on the building of a nuclear weapon. He and Wirtz then discussed the production of heavy water as a neutron moderator for the projected bomb with the Army Ordnance (Heereswaffenamt, HWA) in Berlin, and he managed to interest Paul Herold at IG Farben in testing catalytic conversion as a more economically viable alternative to electrolysis.

In January 1942, he and Heisenberg personally intervened in Berlin, using the Wehrmacht connections of his brother-in-law, Gerhard Leibholz, to obtain exemptions (Unabkömmlichstellung) from the military service call-up for Harteck and Carl Friedrich von Weizsäcker as core members of the German nuclear programme. In February 1942, he attended a conference on the industrial production of heavy water through catalytic conversion at the Kaiser Wilhelm Institute for Physics in Berlin with Harteck, Hans Suess and Paul Herold of IG Farben. With the Nazi government reserving large expenses for its war effort, IG Farben was subsequently contracted by HWA to build the plant in return for a share in patent rights on nuclear power. In late September 1943, having faced repeated Allied sabotage of Norwegian heavy water production, Bonhoeffer held a meeting to discuss IG Farben's financial demands, together with Kurt Diebner and Harteck, as a heavy water pilot plant in Germany was nearing completion. The plant was abandoned due to its excessive price tag, and Bonhoeffer's student Herbert Hoyer experimented with an exchange process facilitated by bacteria.

He survived the British air raid on Leipzig in December 1943.

In October 1944, Harteck sent his former student, a physical chemist called Clasen who had just been released from Waffen-SS service for scientific research and specialised in isotope separation, to work with Bonhoeffer. This was due to Harteck's superior, the plenipotentiary of nuclear physics Walther Gerlach's wish to keep the expanding influence of the SS at bay.

=== Post-WW2 career ===
He stayed in Leipzig after its capture by US Army in April 1945 and subsequent transfer to the projected Soviet occupation zone in July 1945. In the spring of 1946, he turned down a job offer at the University of Göttingen due to increasing tensions between western and eastern zones, and having made a visit to west Germany complained in a letter to Heisenberg that physicists in the western zone had written off their colleagues in the east.

He became a professor for physical chemistry at the University of Berlin in 1947. Bonhoeffer was also director of the Kaiser Wilhelm Institute for physical and electrochemistry (now the Fritz Haber Institute of the MPG).

In 1949, he was appointed director of the Max Planck Institute for Physical Chemistry in Göttingen. The institute was restructured long after his death in 1971 and is now the Max Planck Institute for Biophysical Chemistry in Göttingen, also known as the Karl-Friedrich Bonhoeffer Institute.

== Research ==
In 1929 Bonhoeffer, together with Paul Harteck, discovered the spin isomers of hydrogen, orthohydrogen and parahydrogen.

He died in Göttingen in 1957 at the age of 58.

== Bibliography ==
- Walker, Mark (1989). German National Socialism and the Quest for Nuclear Power, 1939–1949. New York: Cambridge University Press. ISBN 978-0-521-36413-3.
- Walker, Mark (2024). Hitler's Atomic Bomb: History, Legend, and the Twin Legacies of Auschwitz and Hiroshima. Cambridge: Cambridge University Press. ISBN 9781009479288.
