= Friedrich Simmel =

Friedrich C. Simmel (born 1970) is a German biophysicist and professor at the Technical University of Munich. He is a researcher in the field of DNA nanotechnology and is best known for his work on DNA nanomachines and dynamic DNA-based systems.

Simmel received a PhD in experimental physics from LMU Munich in 1999. From 2000 to 2002 he was a post-doctoral researcher at Bell Labs. He joined the faculty of the Technical University of Munich as a full professor in 2007.

== Awards and memberships ==
- 2006 Human frontier science program (HFSP) young investigator award
- 2009 Vice President (2009) of the International Society of Nanoscale Science, Computation and Engineering (ISNSCE)
- 2010 President (2009) of the International Society of Nanoscale Science, Computation and Engineering (ISNSCE)
- 2013 Elected Member of the National Academy of Science and Technology (acatech)

== Works ==
- DNA-based self-assembly of chiral plasmonic nanostructures with tailored optical response, Anton Kuzyk, Robert Schreiber, Zhiyuan Fan, Günther Pardatscher, Eva-Maria Roller, Alexander Högele, Friedrich C. Simmel, Alexander O. Govorov, Tim Liedl, Nature, 483, 311-314, 2012
