= Max Planck Institute for Ornithology =

Research institute in Seewiesen, Germany

- Max-Planck-Institut für Ornithologie
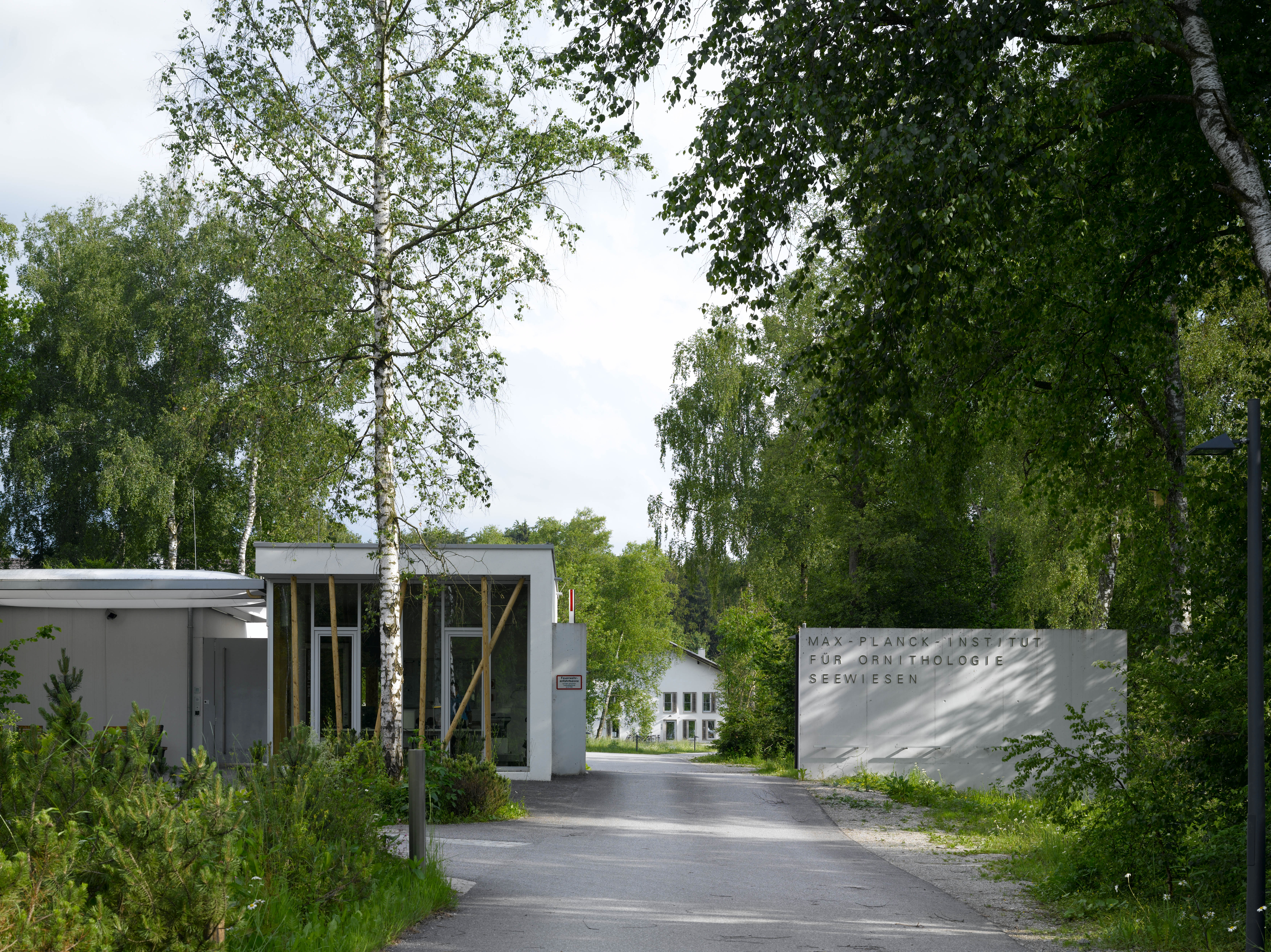
- Abbreviation: MPIO
- Formation: 19 March 2004
- Dissolved: 31 December 2022
- Type: Research institute
- Location: Pöcking-Seewiesen, Bavaria, Germany
- Coordinates: 47.972456°N 11.235666°E
- Fields: Organismic biology, zoology, ornithology, neurobiology, behavioural ecology, evolutionary biology, evolutionary genetics
- Parent organization: Max Planck Society
- Staff: about 150 (2016)

The Max Planck Institute for Ornithology (German: Max-Planck-Institut für Ornithologie, abbreviated MPIO) was a non-university research institution under the sponsorship of the Max Planck Society. As of 1 January 2023, it merged with the Max Planck Institute for Neurobiology (MPIN) to form the new Max Planck Institute for Biological Intelligence (MPI-BI). The MPIO was located in Seewiesen, which belongs to the municipality of Pöcking in Upper Bavaria.

The institute’s focus was on basic scientific research in the fields of organismic biology, zoology, ornithology, neurobiology, behavioural ecology, evolutionary biology and evolutionary genetics. The institute is managed on a collegial basis, i.e. one of the two directors of the institute takes over the management for a certain time period. The last managing director was Manfred Gahr (2020–2022).

== History and current developments ==
The Max Planck Institute for Behavioural Physiology was inaugurated in Seewiesen in 1958 under the direction of Erich von Holst and the later Nobel Prize winner Konrad Lorenz. In 1959, the Ornithological station in Radolfzell was attached to the MPI for Behavioral Physiology. Up to this day, the coordination of bird ringing for South Germany, Austria and Berlin happens in Radolfzell. The Max Planck Institute is a member of the European Union for Bird Ringing (EURING).

The history of the ornithological station in Radolfzell reaches back to the former Rossitten Bird Observatory, which was founded by the German Ornithological Society under Johannes Thienemann in 1901 in what was then East Prussia (today the Rybatschi Bird Observatory). In 1924, the Rossitten Bird Observatory was integrated into the Kaiser Wilhelm Society, moved to Radolfzell in 1946 and incorporated into the Max Planck Society in 1949.

In 1999, the Max Planck Institute for Behavioural Physiology closed down and became the research unit for Ornithology of the Max Planck Society by making the departments of Eberhard Gwinner (Andechs) and Peter Berthold at the ornithological station in Radolfzell independent. In 2004, the research unit turned into the Max Planck Institute for Ornithology.

Until June 2019, the Max Planck Institute for Ornithology had a branch in Radolfzell on Lake Constance and in Konstanz, with the directors Margaret Crofoot, Martin Wikelski and Iain Couzin. They are now the independent Max Planck Institute of Animal Behavior.

On 1 January 2023, the Max Planck Institute for Ornithology and the Max Planck Institute of Neurobiology merged to form the new Max Planck Institute for Biological Intelligence (MPI-BI).

== The structure of the institute ==
The institute consists of two departments, seven research groups and two working groups.

- Department of Behavioural Neurobiology, Manfred Gahr
- Department of Behavioural Ecology and Evolutionary Genetics, Bart Kempenaers
- Research Group Evolution of Sensory Systems, Maude Baldwin
- Research Group Communication and Social Behaviour, Henrik Brumm
- Research Group Acoustic and Functional Ecology, Holger Goerlitz
- Research Group Evolutionary Physiology, Michaela Hau
- Research Group Behavioural Genetics and Evolutionary Ecology, Clemens Küpper
- Research Group Avian Sleep, Niels Rattenborg
- Research Group Neural Circuits for Vocal Communication, Daniela Vallentin
- Working Group Comparative Cognition, Auguste von Bayern
- Working Group Pablo Oteiza

== Wind tunnel for research on bird migration ==
Since 1999, the MPI for Ornithology possesses a wind tunnel in Seewiesen. It has been especially designed for the investigation of aerodynamic aspects and allows the researchers to observe and record animals in flight in a flying section. At the beginning, the main research focus was on metabolic questions (heart rates, wing beat frequencies, water balance, fat metabolism etc.). However, the construction of the tunnel allows for many other studies in diverse fields of interest. The wind tunnel can be used by external researchers. It is the worldwide second tunnel built for flight simulation with birds.

== International Max Planck Research School for Organismal Biology ==
Since 2009, the doctoral training at the Max Planck Institute for Ornithology took place within the International Max Planck Research School for Organismal Biology (short: IMPRS for Organismal Biology). It was a structured first-class educational program, organized in cooperation with the Max Planck Institute of Animal Behavior in Radolfzell and Konstanz and the Department of Biology at the University of Konstanz. The IMPRS for Organismal Biology officially ended in 2023.
