= Alain Fischer =

French doctor and medical researcher

Alain Fischer (born 11 September 1949 in Paris) is a doctor, professor of pediatric immunology and French researcher in biology.

== Biography ==
Alain Fischer's father had wanted to become a doctor, but had been prevented from doing so by the numerous clauses established against the Jews of Hungary. Alain Fischer says his father was one of the reasons he has made a medical career choice.

Fischer obtained his medical degree in 1979, and worked with Claude Griscelli at the Neckers-Enfants Malade Hospital. He became Professor of Immunology (PU-PH) at the University of Paris Descartes, and then Director of the Inserm unit, "Normal and pathological development of the immune system", in 1991. He was Head of the Pediatric Immunology and Hematology Unit (UIH) at Necker Hospital from 1996 to 2012.

Fischer was elected in November 2002 as a full member of the French Academy of sciences, and was a member of the National Consultative Ethics Committee from 2005 to 2009. In 2007, he was one of the founding members of the Imagine Institute of Genetic Diseases. In 2008, he received the Inserm Grand Prize for his work. On 5 May 2011, Alain Fischer was elected a full member of the French Academy of Medicine.

In July 2011, he joined Martine Aubry's campaign team for the 2012 presidential election, working with Jean Mallot and Brigitte Dormont on the theme "Health and Social Security".

Alain Fischer has held the chair of experimental medicine at the Collège de France since 15 May 2014, the date of his inaugural lecture. He is a member of the Scientific Council of the IRIS Association.

== Scientific contribution ==
Alain Fischer's work has been focused for years on immunodeficiency acquired from birth (such as bubble babies) and curative approaches using gene therapies. With Marina Cavazzana-Calvo and Salima Hacein-Bey, he obtained in 1999, the first clinical successes in the world of gene therapies for about ten bubble children, two of whom developed leukaemias after a few months, and one of whom had died. The test was stopped urgently in 2002. Research will show that these leukaemias are due to random insertion into a proto-oncogene of the drug gene. The trial is restarted in 2004, according to a modified protocol using better retroviral vectors, and will be stopped again in 2005 due to new complications. However, of the 16 children treated to date, 15 are satisfactorily cured of their acute immune deficiency.

== Awards and honours ==
- 1984: Bernard Halpern Prize
- 1998: Chevalier of the Ordre national du Mérite
- 2001: co-winner of the Louis-Jeantet Prize for Medicine
- 2008: Grand Prix de l'Inserm
- 2015: Japan Prize
- 2017: Commandeur of the Legion of Honour (Chevalier in 2001, officier in 2010)
