= Howard Kapnek Schachman =

Howard Kapnek Schachman (December 5, 1918 – August 5, 2016) was a graduate school professor in the Department of Molecular & Cell Biology at the University of California, Berkeley.

== Early life ==
Schachman was born in Philadelphia in 1918. In high school, he was interested in sociopolitical issues, inspired by his mother. He initially pursued liberal arts in college while studying to become a rabbi, before switching to chemical engineering in a university. He transferred from the University of Pennsylvania to the Massachusetts Institute of Technology, where he graduated in 1939 with a chemical engineering degree.

== Graduate studies ==
He received a Ph.D. from Princeton University in 1948 and joined the faculty of UC Berkeley. He signed but protested the loyalty oath required by the Regents of the University of California during McCarthyism. He was elected to the American Academy of Arts and Sciences (1966) and the United States National Academy of Sciences (1968).

Among many other honors, he received the AAAS Scientific Freedom and Responsibility Award in 2000.

The "Howard K. Schachman Public Service Award" of the ASBMB is named after him.

== Teaching career ==
Each spring, he taught the MCB 293C course on Ethical Conduct of Research required for NIH-funded students. He died at the age of 97 on August 5, 2016.

== Personal life ==
While at Princeton he married Ethel Lazarus.
