= Martinsried =

- Gemeindeteil of Planegg
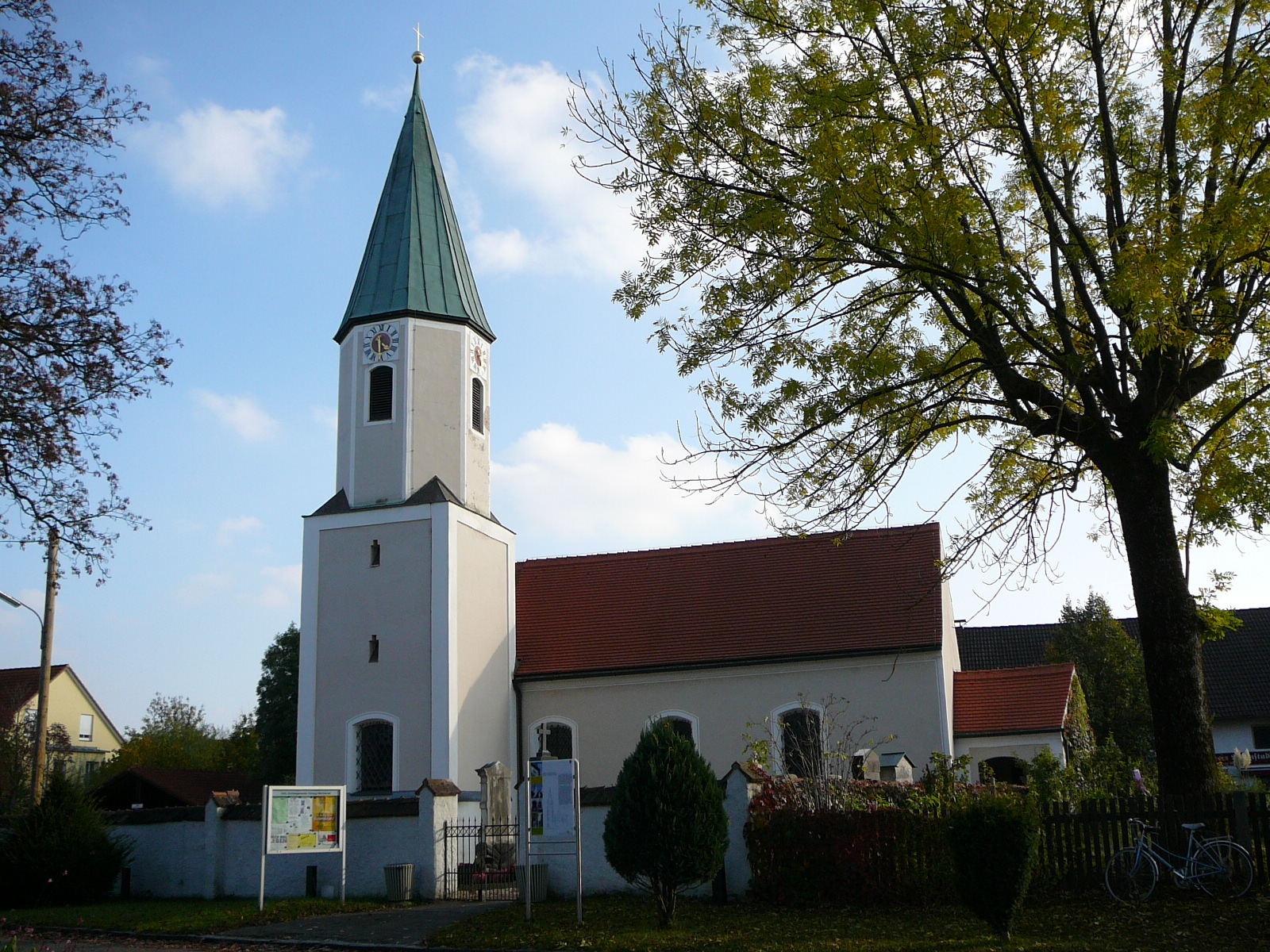
- St. Martin's Church
- Interactive map of Martinsried
- Location within Germany Location within Bavaria
- Coordinates: 48°06′N 11°27′E
- Country: Germany
- State: Bavaria
- Admin. region: Upper Bavaria
- District: Munich
- Municipality: Planegg
- First mentioned: 1180

Population (1 August 2021)
  - Total: 4,207
- Time zone: UTC+01:00 (CET)
  - Summer (DST): UTC+02:00 (CEST)
- Postal codes: 82152
- Dialling codes: 089
- Vehicle registration: M

Martinsried is a village in the municipality of Planegg in Munich district, Bavaria, Germany. It is one of Munich's two science suburbs.

Martinsried is best known as the location of the Max Planck Institute of Biochemistry, the Max Planck Institute for Biological Intelligence, and the accompanying biotechnology campus, which actually straddles the Munich/Planegg border. The campus is adjacent to the Großhadern hospital campus, housing most of the Faculty of Medicine of LMU Munich. The university's Faculty of Chemistry and a part of the Faculty of Biology also relocated to this new campus in 1999 and 2005.

Munich's other "science suburb" is Garching, situated to the north on the opposite end of the U6 subway, with a large part of the Technical University of Munich and several Max Planck Institutes.

== Geography ==
Martinsried is located in the Munich gravel plain and directly borders the urban area of Munich, near Großhadern. The village center lies about 2.5 km from the centre of Planegg and about 15 km southwest of Munich's city centre.

== Infrastructure ==
North of Martinsried, state road 2343 goes from Gräfelfing to Munich. To the south, state road 2344 goes from Planegg to the junction with the Munich-Fürstenried A95 motorway.

The Martinsried research campus can be reached by the Munich U-Bahn line U6 from the Großhadern (20 min. walk) or Klinikum Großhadern (change to bus 266) stations.

=== U-Bahn Martinsried extension ===
Construction work for an extension of the U6 line to Martinsried began at the end of 2022 and completion is expected for 2027.

According to earlier plans, Martinsried was to be connected directly to the Munich U-Bahn from 2020. On 16 December 2014, the Bavarian government decided to continue the Munich U-Bahn line 6-West from Klinikum Großhadern to Martinsried. €73.5 million were invested and an approximately 980-meter long route was to be built starting in 2016 and go into operation four years later. Due to delays, construction could not begin until 2022, with the total costs rising to €212 million. The extension of the U6 in the south to Martinsried was already decided on 20 July 2009 by the Munich City Council, but the originally projected 2014/2015 opening could not be realized. After the construction of the U9 section, the U6 would end at the Klinikum Großhadern and the U9 would continue beyond Martinsried. Later, Martinsried and Planegg could also be connected via S-Bahn.

The Catholic and Evangelical Churches each have a kindergarten in the village, and there are also three nursery schools maintained by the worker's welfare. The suburb operates a primary school.

== Bibliography ==
- Heike Werner: Architektur-Ausflüge ab München: Würmtal & Umgebung, München, 2011, ISBN 978-3-9809471-4-5
