= Max Planck Institute of Biochemistry =

Research institute in Martinsried, Germany

- Max-Planck-Institut für Biochemie
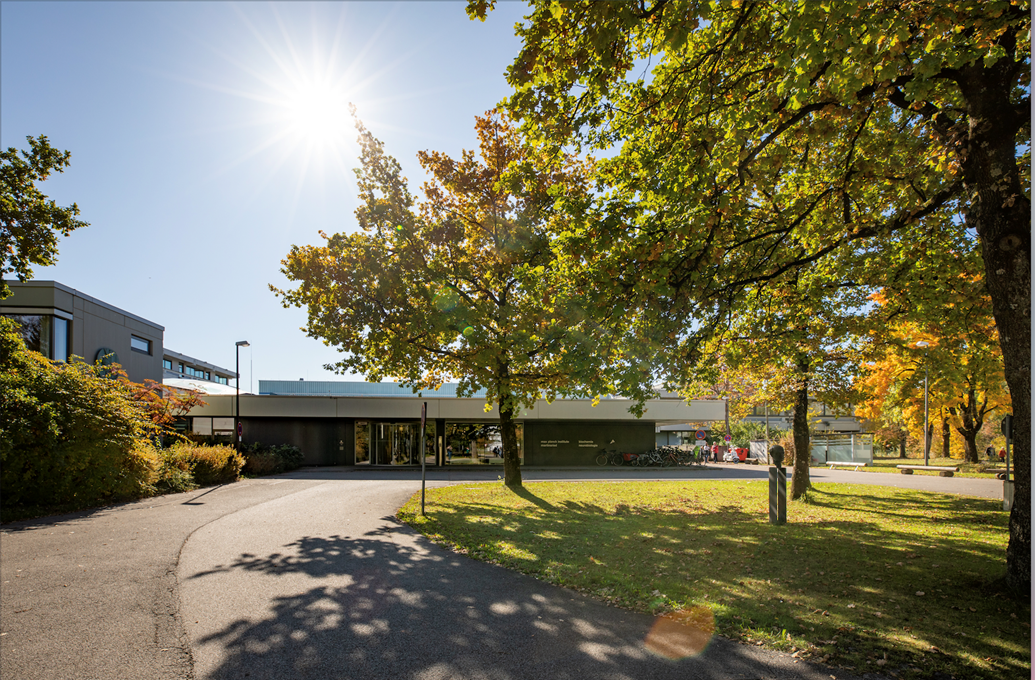
- MPIB entrance
- Abbreviation: MPIB
- Formation: 1973; 53 years ago
- Type: Research institute
- Purpose: Basic research
- Location: Planegg-Martinsried, Bavaria, Germany
- Coordinates: 48°6′19″N 11°27′33″E
- Fields: Developmental biology, evolutionary biology, genetics, immunology, infection biology, medicine, structural biology, cell biology
- Executive Director: Franz-Ulrich Hartl
- Parent organization: Max Planck Society
- Staff: about 750
- Website: www.biochem.mpg.de

The Max Planck Institute of Biochemistry (MPIB; German: Max-Planck-Institut für Biochemie) is a research institute of the Max Planck Society located in Martinsried, a suburb of Munich. The institute was founded in 1973 by the merger of three formerly independent institutes: the Max Planck Institute of Biochemistry, the Max Planck Institute of Protein and Leather Research (founded 1954 in Regensburg), and the Max Planck Institute of Cell Chemistry (founded 1956 in Munich).

With about 750 employees in currently nine research departments and more than 20 research groups, the MPIB is one of the largest institutes of the Max Planck Society.

== Departments ==
There are nine departments currently in the institute:

- Cell and Virus Structure (John A. G. Briggs)
- Cellular Biochemistry (Franz-Ulrich Hartl)
- Cellular and Molecular Biophysics (Petra Schwille)
- Machine Learning and Systems Biology (Karsten Borgwardt)
- Molecular Machines and Signaling (Brenda Schulman)
- Molecular Medicine (Reinhard Fässler)
- Proteomics and Signal Transduction (Matthias Mann)
- Structural Cell Biology (Elena Conti)
- Totipotency (Kikuë Tachibana)

== Research groups ==
There are 26 research groups currently based at the MPIB, including 3 emeritus research groups:

- Bacteriophages: Microbiology, Bacteriophages, RNA polymerases, Structural Biology, Biochemistry (Maria Sokolova)
- Cell and Virus Structures: Structural Biology, Cryo-Electron Tomography, Viruses, Membrane trafficking (John Briggs)
- Cell Dynamics: Phagocytosis, Actin Dynamics, Cell Motility (Günther Gerisch)
- Cellular and Molecular Biophysics: Biophysics, Fluorescence Correlation Spectroscopy, Atomic Force Microscopy, Single Molecule, Synthetic Biology (Petra Schwille)
- Cellular Biochemistry: Molecular Chaperones, Protein Folding, Protostasis, Aging and Neurodegenerative Diseases (Franz-Ulrich Hartl)
- Chaperonin-assisted Protein Folding: Protein Folding and Assembly, Rubisco, GroEL and GroES, Mass Spectrometry (Manajit Hayer-Hartl)
- Chromatin Biology: Genetics and Biochemistry of Chromatin, Transcription, Histone Modifications, Drosophila Development (Jürg Müller)
- Chromosome Biology: Cell division, Meiosis (Wolfgang Zachariae)
- Computational Systems Biochemistry: Systems Biology, Proteomics, Mass Spectrometry, Bioinformatics (Jürgen Cox)
- CryoEM Technology: Cryo-Electron Tomography, Focused Ion Beam Milling, correlated light microscopy, in situ Structural Biology, visual Proteomics (Jürgen Plitzko)
- DNA Hybridnanomaterials: DNA Nanotechnology, DNA-Silica Hybridnanomaterials, Bionanotechnology, Biophysics (Amelie Heuer-Jungemann)
- Immunoregulation: Immunity, Macrophage: T cell cross-talk, Self-Tolerance, Amino Acid metabolism (Peter Murray)
- Machine Learning and Systems Biology: biomedical research, data mining, machine learning, biological systems (Karsten Borgwardt)
- Mechanisms of Protein Biogenesis: RNA Biology; Translation Dynamics; Protein Folding; Systems Biology (Danny Nedialkova)
- Molecular Imaging and Bionanotechnology: Super-Resolution Microscopy, DNA Nanotechnology, Biophysics, Single-Molecule Studies (Ralf Jungmann)
- Molecular Machines and Signaling: Structural Biology, Ubiquitin Proteasome System, Ubiquitin-like Proteins (Brenda Schulman)
- Molecular Medicine: Integrin, Adhesion Signalling, Mouse Genetics (Reinhard Fässler)
- Molecular Structural Biology: Cryo-Electron Tomography, Electron Microscopical Structure Research, Protein and Cell Structure, Protein Degradation (Wolfgang Baumeister)
- Proteomics and Signal Transduction: Mass Spectrometry, Systems Biology, Bioinformatics, Cancer (Matthias Mann)
- Structural Cell Biology: Structural Studies, RNA Transport, RNA Surveillance, RNA Degradation (Elena Conti)
- Structure and Dynamics of Molecular Machines: DNA Replication Dynamics, Structural Biology, Single-Molecule Imaging, Biophysics (Karl Duderstadt)
- Structure Research: Structural Biology, Methods of Protein Crystallography, Protein Degradation, Medicinal Chemistry (Robert Huber)
- Totipotency: Mechanistic Cell Biology, Genomics and Biochemistry of Chromatin Reprogramming, Transcription, Mouse Genetics (Kikuë Tachibana)
- Translational Medicine: Fibronectin, Integrin, Bone, Disease (Inaam Nakchbandi)

== Graduate Program ==
The International Max Planck Research School for Molecules of Life (IMPRS-ML) is a PhD program covering various aspects of life science ranging from biochemistry to computational biology. The school is run in cooperation with the Max Planck Institute for Biological Intelligence, LMU Munich, and the Technical University of Munich.
