= Max Planck Institute for Biological Intelligence =

Research institute in Germany

- Max-Planck-Institut für biologische Intelligenz
- Abbreviation: MPI-BI
- Formation: 1 January 2023; 3 years ago
- Type: Research institute
- Locations: Planegg-Martinsried, Bavaria, Germany; Pöcking-Seewiesen, Bavaria, Germany
- Fields: Organismic biology, ornithology, neurobiology, behavioral ecology, evolutionary biology, evolutionary genetics, neuroscience
- Official languages: German, English
- Managing director: Manfred Gahr
- Parent organization: Max Planck Society
- Staff: about 500
- Website: www.bi.mpg.de

The Max Planck Institute for Biological Intelligence (German: Max-Planck-Institut für biologische Intelligenz; abbreviated MPI-BI) is a non-university research institute of the Max Planck Society. The institute is dedicated to basic research on topics in behavioral ecology, evolutionary biology and neuroscience. Research at the international institute focuses on how animal organisms acquire, store, apply and pass on knowledge about their environment in order to find ever-new solutions to problems and adapt to a constantly changing environment. Model organisms include Drosophila, zebrafish, mice and various bird species.

== Structure and history ==
The board of directors manages the institute, with around 500 employees coming from more than 50 nations. One of the institute's directors is taking over as managing director for a specific time. As of February 2024, Manfred Gahr is the managing director of the institute.

The MPI-BI emerged in January 2022 from the Max Planck Institute of Neurobiology (MPIN) and the Max Planck Institute for Ornithology (MPIO). Following a founding year, the legal founding of the institute took place on 1 January 2023.

== Campus ==
The institute has two locations: At the nature-oriented Seewiesen campus, in the municipality of Pöcking near Starnberg, field research is combined with modern methods of behavioral biology. At the Martinsried campus in the southwest of Munich, neuroscientific research is currently the main focus. Here, laboratory experiments are combined with state-of-the-art methods such as optogenetics, connectomics or machine learning.

== Scientific scope ==
Scientific research at the Max Planck Institute for Biological Intelligence is thematically divided into five research departments and 13 independent research groups. Numerous thematic connections between the groups result in a lively exchange and numerous collaborations within the institute.

Biological intelligence describes the ability to achieve complex goals. Animal organisms are able to attain this for example by means of calculation, planning and decision-making—as individuals or in groups. The brains and the associated behavior that we can observe today are the result of evolution due to the successful adaptation to previously mastered challenges.

The goal of research at MPI-BI is to decipher the mechanisms of biological intelligence at its various levels. Research approaches ranging from the investigation of molecular interactions to those of entire groups of individuals. A particular focus lays on animal behavior in its natural environment, as the adaptation of biological systems occurs in harmony with their surroundings. The study of the brain in its natural environment thus provides insight, for example, into how organisms communicate with each other and change their environment, or how social interactions lead to the formation of differentiated societies.

=== Departments ===
- Department Genes – Circuits – Behavior, headed by Herwig Baier
- Department Evolution of Sensory and Physiological Systems, headed by Maude Baldwin
- Department Synapses – Circuits – Plasticity, headed by Tobias Bonhoeffer
- Department of Behavioral Neurobiology, headed by Manfred Gahr
- Department of Ornithology, headed by Bart Kempenaers
