= Millitome =

Device used in single-cell analysis

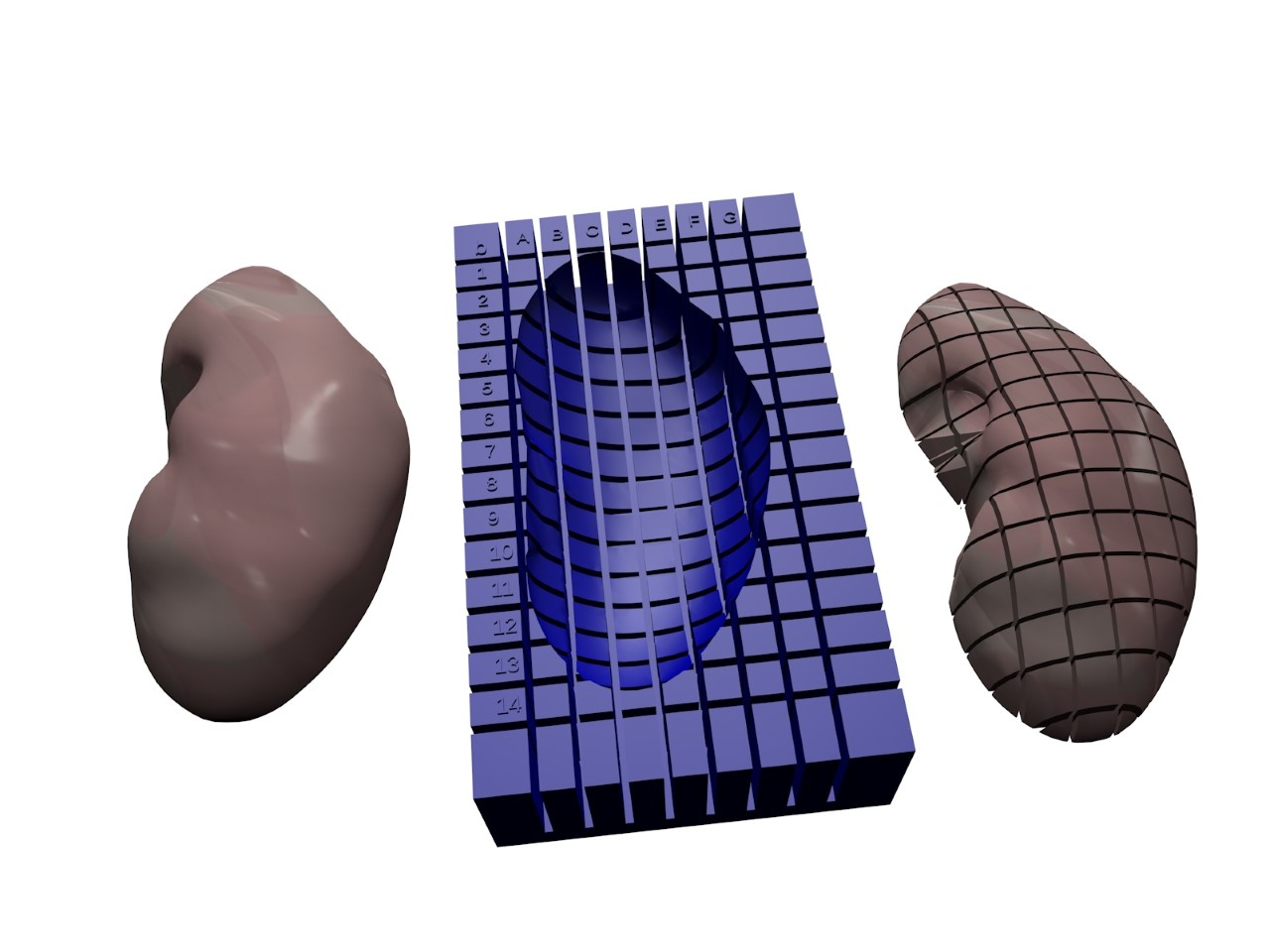
Kidney reference organ (left); 3D-printed milltome with tissue block IDs (center); matching 3D blocks

A millitome (from Latin mille, meaning "thousand," as in millimeter, and the Greek temnein meaning "to cut") is a device designed to hold a freshly procured organ and facilitate cutting it into many small tissue blocks for usage in single-cell analysis. A millitome has discrete, equally placed cutting grooves in both the x and y directions to guide a carbon steel cutting knife to produce uniformly sized slices or cubes of tissue material. Millitome design and usage was developed by the HIVE MC-IU Team, Indiana University (PI: Katy Börner; NIH Award No: OT2OD026671) and members of the Cyberinfrastructure for Network Science Center (CNS) for the Human Reference Atlas project, which is part of the U.S. National Institutes of Health Common Fund’s Human Biomolecular Atlas Program (HuBMAP).

Millitomes are used to create uniformly sized tissue blocks that match the shape and size of organs from HuBMAP's 3D Reference Object Library. A millitome has an associated digital data package that includes an STL file, a spreadsheet for assigning spatial locations to HuBMAP IDs, and a metadata file with information about the size, dimensions, donor sex, and laterality of the reference organ for which the millitome is fitted. The procedures outlined here describe how millitomes are generated and how spatial locations for each slice or cube are retained in the Human Reference Atlas.

== Models ==
A millitome modeler creates millitome 3D files that can be 3D printed and is responsible for generating matching 3D virtual blocks for use in the HuBMAP CCF Exploration User Interface or other virtual environments. OpenScad, an open-source, code-based 3D modeler, is used to create the 3D geometry. All millitome models use 3D reference organs from the NLM Visible Human Project available via the Human Reference Atlas Portal.

The resulting 3D model has two main uses:

1. provides 3D geometry data which can be 3D printed, creating a physical millitome. In this case, the 3D files are exported in STL format and imported into a 3D printing application such as Ultimaker Cura or Matter Control.
2. provides 3D data for tissue blocks cut with the same millitome to be used in a web interface like HuBMAP's EUI.

Using the same 3D geometry for both purposes guarantees that dimensions, proportions and other attributes of a specific millitome match in both the physical and virtual versions.

== Access and usage ==
A millitome user visits the HRA Millitome website to access precompiled millitomes for different organs and select the best matching organs in terms of donor sex, organ laterality (if applicable), organ size, and cutting distances. The user then downloads a data file package for the customized millitome that comprises three files:

1. an STL file used to 3D print the millitome tissue cutting tool
2. a Lookup CSV file that ties predefined millitome IDs to HuBMAP IDs
3. a Metadata CSV file with information about the millitome to ensure reproducibility

The STL file can be 3D printed in house or sent to a commercial printing service. The Lookup CSV file ties millitome IDs (denoting a tissue block on the millitome) to HuBMAP IDs (physical tissue blocks cut with the millitome). The Metadata CSV file provides the following metadata about the millitome: organ, sex, laterality (if applicable), size of tissue block, and size of the cutting grid used by the millitome. It also contains metadata about each millitome ID in the millitome STL: x, y, z-position and x, y-dimension.

== Use in cutting tissue ==
The millitome tray is used with a carbon or stainless steel knife. Once the organ is cut, the location and rotation of all tissue blocks should be maintained. Ice cube trays have been used successfully to keep tissue blocks separated and in order. As one 3D printing of a millitome can take several hours, organ SMEs interested in acquiring many tissue cubes from a whole organ should pre-print millitomes of standard sizes and keep them on hand in their labs. This allows for human tissue to be cut immediately when it becomes available.

== Identifying tissue blocks ==
The Lookup CSV spreadsheet provided as part of the data package lists Millitome IDs that have been pre-assigned to each block in the cutting grid. Militome IDs are assigned using numbers for the y-axis, letters for the x-axis, and letters “b” or “t” for bottom/top laterality. The Millitome User records the Tissue Block ID assigned to each tissue sample based on their location within the millitome. This allows data from the tissue sample to be connected to a particular virtual tissue block location within the reference organ.

== Reviewing Millitome Tissue Registrations ==
Once the millitome data package has been ingested by the Infrastructure Engagement Component of the HuBMAP Consoritum, the millitome user visits the Exploration User Interface to verify that the size, placement, and orientation of all tissue blocks is correct. Information on this process is outlined in the Registration User Interface SOP under the section "Checking Your Registration with the Exploration User Interface." If corrections or adjustments are needed, the millitome user contacts the facilitator to make the updates.
