= George Santangelo =

American genomicist and data scientist

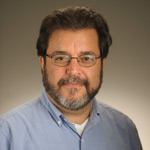
- Education: University of Pennsylvania; Yale University (Ph.D.)
- Scientific career
- Workplaces: Office of Portfolio Analysis

George M. Santangelo is an American genomicist and data scientist. He is the director of the Office of Portfolio Analysis at the National Institutes of Health.

== Education and career ==
Santangelo received his bachelor's degree from the University of Pennsylvania, and his Ph.D. from Yale University. In 2011, he was appointed as director of the newly formed Office of Portfolio Analysis at the National Institutes of Health. Santangelo oversees a team of analysts, data scientists, and software developers to enable data-driven decision-making.

== Selected works ==
- Hoppe, Travis; Litovitz, Aviva; Willis, Kristine; Meseroll, Rebecca; Perkins, Matthew; Hutchins, B. Ian; Davis, Alison; Lauer, Michael; Valantine, Hannah; Anderson, James; Santangelo, George (October 9, 2019). "Topic choice contributes to the lower rate of NIH awards to African-American/black scientists". Science Advances. 5 (10) eaaw7238. Bibcode:2019SciA....5.7238H. doi:10.1126/sciadv.aaw7238. PMC 6785250. PMID 31633016.
- Menon, B. B.; Sarma, N. J.; Pasula, S.; Deminoff, S. J.; Willis, K. A.; Barbara, K. E.; Andrews, B.; Santangelo, G. M. (April 2005). "Reverse recruitment: The Nup84 nuclear pore subcomplex mediates Rap1/Gcr1/Gcr2 transcriptional activation". Proceedings of the National Academy of Sciences. 102 (16): 5749–5754. Bibcode:2005PNAS..102.5749M. doi:10.1073/pnas.0501768102. ISSN 0027-8424. PMC 556015. PMID 15817685.
- Santangelo, G. M. (March 2006). "Glucose Signaling in Saccharomyces cerevisiae". Microbiology and Molecular Biology Reviews. 70 (1): 253–282. doi:10.1128/MMBR.70.1.253-282.2006. ISSN 1092-2172. PMC 1393250. PMID 16524925.
- Hutchins, B. Ian; Yuan, Xin; Anderson, James M.; Santangelo, George M. (September 2016). Vaux, David L (ed.). "Relative Citation Ratio (RCR): A New Metric That Uses Citation Rates to Measure Influence at the Article Level". PLOS Biology. 14 (9) e1002541. doi:10.1371/journal.pbio.1002541. ISSN 1545-7885. PMC 5012559. PMID 27599104.
