= James M. Anderson (scientist) =

American scientist

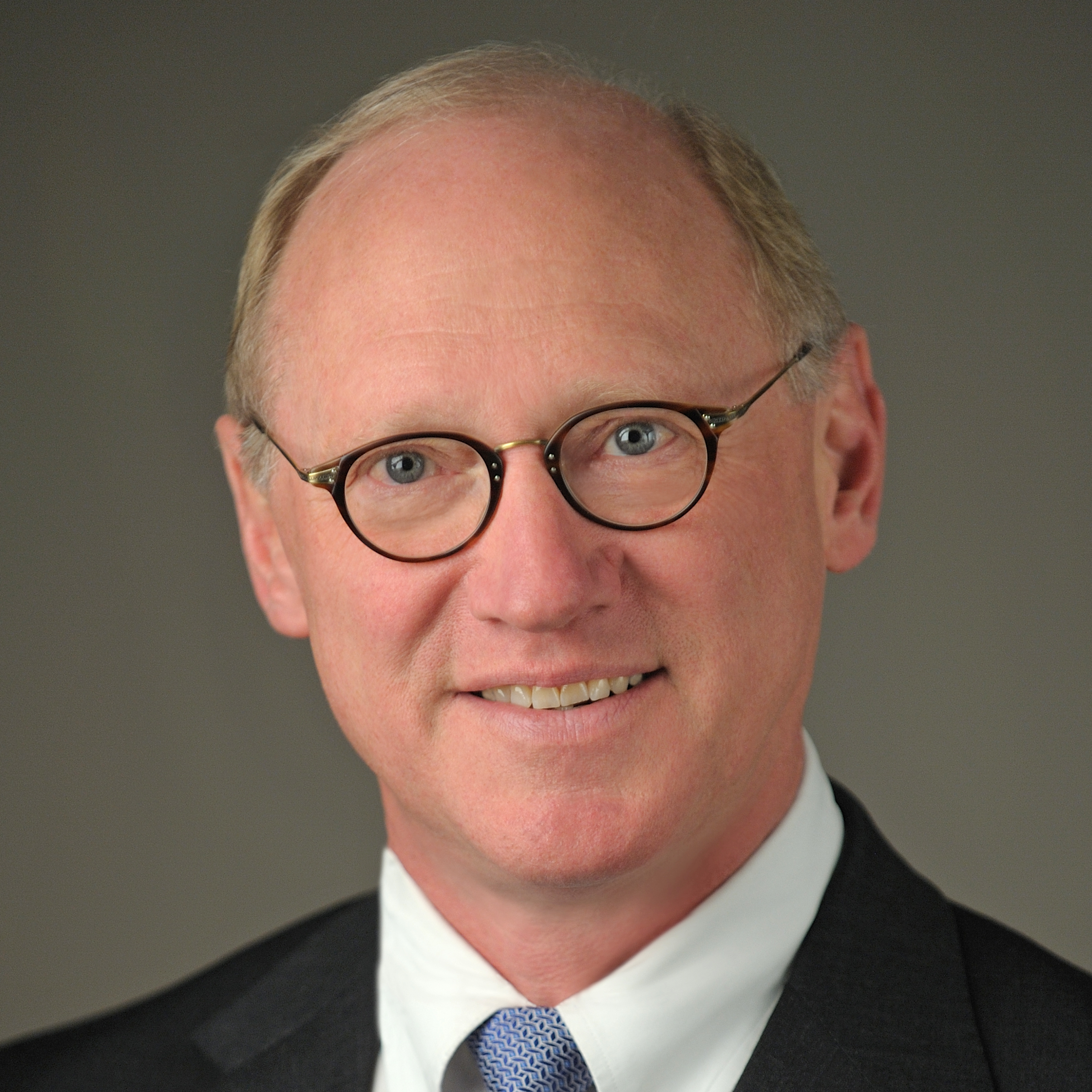

Director of the NIH Division of Program Coordination, Planning, and Strategic Initiatives
- In office September 2010 – incumbent
- Appointed by: Francis Collins
- Preceded by: Position established

Personal details
- Education: Yale College (BS); Harvard University (PhD, MD)

James M. Anderson is an American professor of medicine and cell biology and is a Chief of Section of Digestive Diseases at the Yale School of Medicine. Anderson is also a director of the Division of Program Coordination, Planning, and Strategic Initiatives at the National Institutes of Health.

== Education ==
Anderson received his B.S. in biology from Yale College in 1974 and five years later got a Ph.D. from Harvard University in the same field. He holds an M.D. from Harvard Medical School which he obtained in 1983.

== Career ==
In 2002, Anderson became a professor and Chair of the Department of Cell and Molecular Physiology in the School of Medicine at the University of North Carolina at Chapel Hill. In this capacity, he served on the advisory group for the UNC Building Interdisciplinary Research Careers in Women's Health (BIRCWH) program.

In September 2010, Anderson was appointed by Francis Collins as the director of the Division of Program Coordination, Planning, and Strategic Initiatives.

Anderson has clinical experience in Internal Medicine and Hepatology and is considered among the top authorities in the world in his primary research field of tight junctions and paracellular transport. Anderson researches the paracellular barrier in a laboratory located in the intramural research program of the National Heart, Lung, and Blood Institute. He has been a principal investigator on NIH grants for almost twenty years. He has authored or co-authored over 180 scientific articles, reviews, and book chapters.

In 2018 he helped fund the invention of the Human Biomolecular Atlas Program (HuBMAP).

== Awards and honors ==
Anderson is an elected Fellow of the American Gastroenterological Association and is an elected member of the American Society for Clinical Investigation and the Association of American Physicians. Anderson has received several awards including the 2007 Takeda Distinguished Research Award and the Walter B. Cannon Award, the most prestigious award bestowed by the American Physiological Society.
