= Office of Portfolio Analysis =

US government division assisting the NIH

The Office of Portfolio Analysis was established in the Division of Program Coordination, Planning, and Strategic Initiatives in 2011 to assist NIH Institutes and Centers with scientific portfolio analysis. Per the Federal Register, the Office of Portfolio Analysis serves the following goals:

1. Prepare and analyze data on NIH sponsored biomedical research to inform trans-NIH planning and coordination;
2. Serve as a resource for portfolio management at the programmatic level;
3. Employ databases, analytic tools, methodologies and other resources to conduct assessments in support of portfolio analyses and priority setting in scientific areas of interest across NIH;
4. Research and develop new analytic tools, support systems, and specifications for new resources in coordination with other NIH organizations to enhance the management of the NIH's scientific portfolio; and
5. Provide, in coordination with other NIH organizations, training on portfolio analysis tools, procedures, and methodology.

After its establishment in 2011, George Santangelo was appointed as the first Director of the Office of Portfolio Analysis.

== Analytic tools ==
=== NIH COVID-19 Portfolio ===
In response to the COVID-19 pandemic, the Office of Portfolio Analysis developed the NIH COVID-19 Portfolio to index and track ongoing COVID-19 research and disseminate it to the public. This portfolio is curated by scientific experts for COVID-19 relevance, and includes both peer-reviewed publications indexed in PubMed and preprints from bioRxiv, medRxiv, chemRxiv, arXiv, SSRN, and Research Square.

=== iCite ===
The NIH developed iCite as a bibliometrics dashboard to freely disseminate article-level citation metrics for scientific publications that are indexed in PubMed. One stated purpose of this analytic tool was to replace the use of journal level metrics like the Journal Impact Factor in research assessment and portfolio analysis. Bulk data are made available through database snapshots and an API.As of 2020, iCite hosts three modules focusing on different types of citation metrics:

==== Influence ====
The research community called for the use of article-level citation metrics for research assessment instead of journal-level metrics, in the San Francisco Declaration on Research Assessment. The influence module of iCite disseminates field- and time-normalized article-level citation metrics like the Relative Citation Ratio.

==== Translation ====
Because the NIH is particularly focused on science that improves human health, it developed article-level metrics that track the dissemination of basic research findings into clinical research, a process known as bench to bedside translation. The Translation module of iCite shows which clinical research articles have cited a given publication. For those publications that are not yet cited by a clinical research article, the Translation module shows the Approximate Potential to Translate, which is a machine learning estimate of the probability that the publication will be cited by a clinical research article in the future.

==== Citations ====
In order to maximize transparency, the Office of Portfolio Analysis generated a public-domain citation graph named the NIH Open Citation Collection. This citation graph underpins all citation metrics disseminated in iCite, and sources citation data from several sources, as well as extracting references from the PDFs of open access articles.
