= Office of AIDS Research =

Office of the U.S. National Institutes of Health

The Office of AIDS Research of the National Institutes of Health (NIH) of the United States of America develops guidelines for the use of antiretroviral agents in HIV-1-infected adults and adolescents. OARAC is an advisory group to the Office of AIDS Research. The Office of AIDS Research is an office of the National Institutes of Health's Division of Program Coordination, Planning, and Strategic Initiatives which in turn is governed by the Office of the Director of the NIH. It was founded in 1988 and its first director was Dr. Anthony Fauci.

== Links ==
- Official website
