= National Council on Strength & Fitness =

Organization

The National Council on Strength and Fitness (NCSF) is a member-driven organization of exercise professionals located in Coral Gables, Florida. The NCSF board for certification oversees the National Commission for Certifying Agencies accredited credentialing programs and advocates on behalf of exercise professionals. In 2004, the NCSF organization expanded internationally, offering exercise professional credentialing worldwide. In partnership with Prometric Testing Services the organization provides accredited certification exams in over 10,000 centers within its global network.

== Professional credentials ==
The NCSF Board for Certification provides credentials for exercise professionals. Based on role delineation studies, and consistent with the Department of Labor Statistics for fitness trainers and athletic coaches, the board currently offers three credentials – Certified Personal Trainer, Certified Strength Coach, and Sports Nutrition Specialist. In order to improve obesity/diabetes in the United States the organization has submitted testimonial recommendations for adjustments to the Standard Occupational Classification (2018) aimed to reclassify exercise professionals as health providers rather than service providers.

== History ==
The NCSF was founded in 1996 as an expansion from a community outreach initiative, which began in 1994 at Florida International University. The goal was to improve exercise professional competency in order to promote and enhance community education in health and physical fitness in South Florida. The professional education program was employed for two years before a formal oversight board was established. In 1996 the organization was incorporated and a seven-person board was established as the governing body, chaired by Dr. Richard Lopez, retired program director for the department of exercise physiology, Florida International University. Dr. Lopez received a Lifetime Achievement Award from the NCSF Board for Certification in 2012 for his commitment to the field. In 2001, the board contracted, then, Thompson Prometric, for test development services in an effort to establish minimum competency requirements for exercise professionals serving as Personal Trainers. This came at an opportune time as the International Health, Racquet, and Sportsclub Association board released an (original) recommendation for member clubs and operators within the fitness industry to employee NCCA accredited exercise professionals for positions that oversee fitness instruction of club members. The NCSF joined the National Strength and Conditioning Association and the American Council on Exercise. Since 2004 several other organizations including the American College of Sports Medicine have earned accreditation from the National Commission for Certifying Agencies for exercise professional roles.

== Advocacy ==
In an effort to foster strong, evidence-based curriculum for developing practitioners in the health-fitness fields, the NCSF serves on the Committee on Accreditation for the Exercise Sciences as a sponsoring organization. The committee functions under the Commission on Accreditation of Allied Health Education Programs to evaluate undergraduate and graduate academic programs in Exercise science against established standards and guidelines to promote preparation for students entering the health and fitness industry. In 2013, the NCSF, along with other similar organizations, formed a non-profit 501(c) corporation in support of a uniform standard of minimum competency assurance and professional practices for defined exercise professional roles. The Coalition for the Registration of Exercise Professionals advocates for exercise professionals who have earned an National Commission for Certifying Agencies-accredited health and fitness professional certification.

In 2014 the Coalition for the Registration of Exercise Professionals established the United States Registry of Exercise Professionals. This registry is populated with exercise professionals from Coalition for the Registration of Exercise Professionals member organizations who hold certifications from the National Commission for Certifying Agencies. The registry operates as a clearing house of valid credentials so consumers, employers, and regulators can identify and verify professionals currently certified by member organizations.

NCSF also serves the international community by participating in EuropeActive, formerly the European Health and Fitness Association, annual Standards Council meeting. This meeting functions as a think tank among subject matter experts from Europe and the United States who converge to review and discuss research and its impact on exercise professions and public physical activity engagement.

== Promotion of physical activity engagement ==
In 2012 the NCSF joined the National Coalition for the Promotion of Physical Activity. The organization is made up of a steering committee of sponsoring organizations including the American Heart Association, National Athletic Trainers Association, the Mend Foundation, International Health, Racquet and Sportsclub Association, the American Council on Exercise, the American College of Sports Medicine, and SHAPE America among others, which oversee operations and management of the organization's public policy activities.

Current physical activity legislation

- Carol M. White Physical Education Program
- NIH Common Fund
- Fitness Integrated in Teaching (FIT) Kids Act
- Prevention and Public Health Fund
- Transportation Alternatives Program Improvement Act

Employee wellness is an area in which the National Coalition for the Promotion of Physical Activity has been particularly active. The coalition sponsors the CEO pledge, a national campaign focused on promoting physical activity in the workplace. The CEO Pledge encourage CEOs from across the United States to recognize and support physical activity for employee wellbeing. NCSF Executive Director Dr. Brian Biagioli was one of the inaugural signors of the pledge.
