= Mauro Martino =

Italian artist, designer and researcher

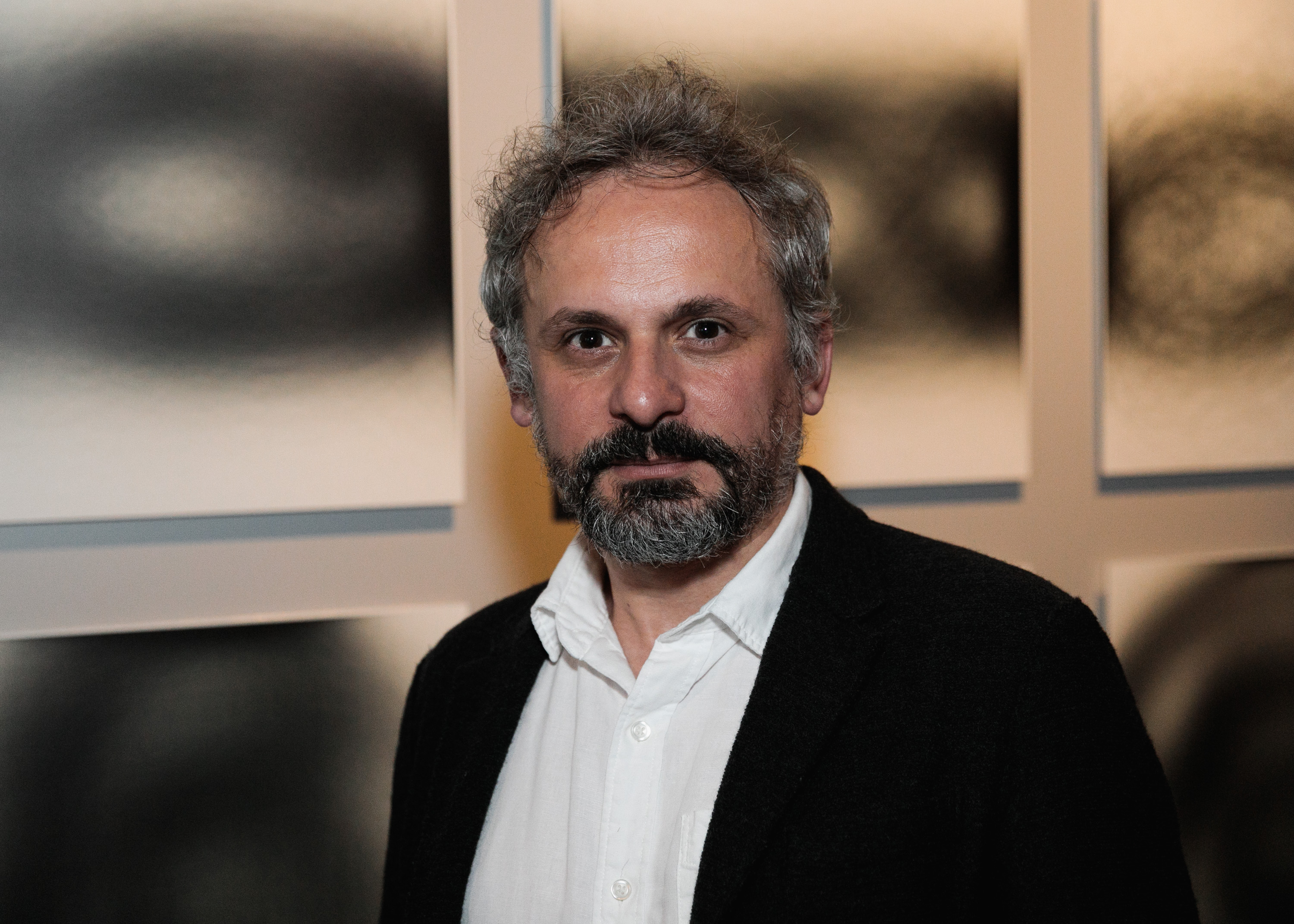
- Martino in 2019
- Education: Polytechnic University of Milan
- Occupations: Artist, designer, researcher
- Employer: Northeastern University
- Known for: Founder of Visual Artificial Intelligence Lab at IBM Research

Mauro Martino is an Italian artist, designer, and researcher. He is the founder and director of the Visual Artificial Intelligence Lab at IBM Research, and Professor of Practice at Northeastern University.

== Education and career ==
Martino graduated from Polytechnic University of Milan, and was a research affiliate with the Senseable City Lab at MIT. Mauro was formerly an Assistant Research Professor at Northeastern University working with Albert-Laszlo Barabasi at Center for Complex Network Research and with David Lazer and Fellows at the Institute for Quantitative Social Science (IQSS) at Harvard University.

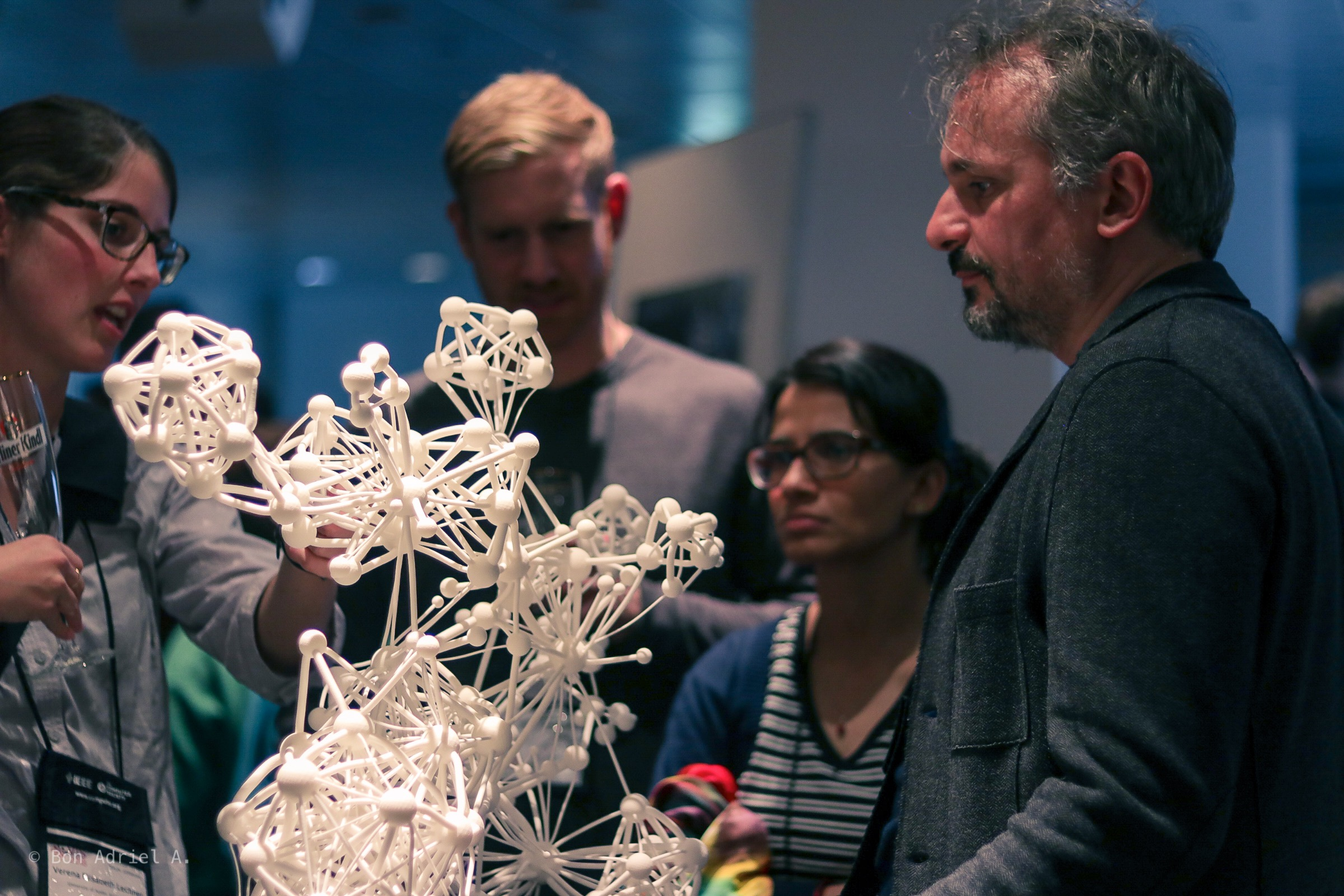
Mauro Martino in 2018

His works have been published in "The Best American Infographics" in the 2015 and 2016 editions and have been shown at international festivals and exhibitions including Ars Electronica, RIXC Art Science Festival, Global Exchange at Lincoln Center, TEDx Cambridge THRIVE, TEDx Riga, and the Serpentine Gallery. His work is in the permanent collection at Ars Electronica Center. In 2017, Martino and his team received the National Science Foundation's award for Best Scientific Video for the project Network Earth. In 2019, Martino and Luca Stornaiuolo won the 2019 Webby People's Voice Award in the category NetArt for the project AI Portraits.

The project 150 Years of Nature won multiple awards such as Fast Company - Innovation by Design Awards Best Data Design 2020, Webby Award 2020, Webby People's Voice Award 2020. This project, along with other works created in collaboration with Barabási Lab (e.g., Wonder Net, A Century of Physics, Data Sculpture in Bronze, Control, Resilience, Success in Science, Fake News), was shown at the "Barabási Lab. Hidden Patterns" exhibitions at ZKM Center for Art and Media and Ludwig Museum - Museum of Contemporary Art, Budapest.

Mauro Martino is a pioneer in the use of the artificial neural network in sculpture.

== Notable works ==
- Strolling Cities is an interactive AI art project created in collaboration with Politecnico di Milano and exhibited in the Italian Pavilion at the 2021 Venice Biennale. Strolling Cities is the first project that "unites generative AI, human voice, poetry and urban landscape." The neural network model was trained on "millions of photos taken during the recent lockdowns (’20/’21) that show the urban space as an unfiltered landscape of walls, streets, and buildings." One of the main characteristics of this project is that Italian cities appear empty, without their population. The project makes it possible to "manipulate the urban landscape with the voice, using any kind of vocal input, from simple utterances to more complex phrases." The video installations used in the exhibit featured 9 Italian cities: Bergamo, Bologna, Catania, Como, Florence, Genoa, Milan, Palermo, Rome and Venice. The authors whose poems appeared in the installation included Alda Merini, Giulia Niccolai, Stefano Benni, Giorgio Caproni, Cesare Pavese, Goffredo Parise, and Valerio Magrelli.
- 150 Years of Nature is a data visualization project created in collaboration with Barabási Lab and dedicated to the 150th Anniversary of Nature. It includes an interactive tool, "data movie" and the cover showing the co-citation network of Nature publications throughout its history. 150 Years of Nature was the Webby Award Winner in 2020; it was awarded the Best Data Design at Fast Company - Innovation by Design Awards. The project is exhibited as part of the "Barabási Lab. Hidden Patterns" exhibitions at ZKM Center for Art and Media and Ludwig Museum - Museum of Contemporary Art, Budapest.
- AI Portraits is a research project that uses artificial neural network to reconstruct a portrait of a person. The AI system was trained on a dataset that included millions of photos of actors and actresses.
- Wonder Net was developed in collaboration with Albert-László Barabási at the Center for Complex Network Research at Northeastern University. Wonder Net includes 8 data sculptures which represent 8 different "data-stories" (e.g., art network, flavor network, fake news network, etc.). It was presented at the IEEE VIS 2018 Arts Program in Berlin.
- Forma Fluens uses the world’s largest doodle data set by Google Quick Draw. This project was presented at 123 DATA design exhibition in Paris.
- Charting Culture maps cultural mobility, tracking the births and deaths of notable individuals, from 600 BC to the present day. Charting Culture is one of the most viewed videos of the Nature Video channel on YouTube with over 1.3 million views. This project is part of the Places & Spaces: Mapping Science exhibit. It was also featured in "The Best American Infographics 2015".
- News Explorer is a web application providing new interface for news analysis and discovery.
- Network Earth won the 2017 Best Scientific Video award of the National Science Foundation. Network Earth explores nature's resilience and interconnections between all life on Earth. It accompanied a research paper published in Nature.
- Rise of Partisanship shows the party polarization of the House of Representatives through time. This project was included in "The Best American Infographics 2016".
- Redrawing the map of Great Britain from a network of human interactions explored a new approach to regional delineation, based on analyzing networks of billions of individual human transactions.

== Awards ==
- 2020: Fast Company – Innovation by Design Awards, Best Data Design: 150 Years of Nature
- 2020: Webby Award Winner: 150 Years of Nature, Webby People's Voice Award Winner: 150 Years of Nature
- 2019: Webby People's Voice Award – Winner, NetArt, AI Portraits
- 2017: Vizzies Visualization Challenge by National Science Foundation and Popular Science – Winner, Best Scientific Video, Network Earth
- 2017: Kantar Information is Beautiful Award – Honorable Mention, Unusual, Forma Fluens
- 2016: Innovation by Design Award by Fast Company, Finalist for Websites & Platforms, Watson News Explorer
- 2016: Kantar Information is Beautiful Award – Silver Medal, Commercial Project, IBM Watson News Explorer
- 2015: Kantar Information is Beautiful Award – Gold Medal in Data visualization, Rise of Partisanship
- 2015: Kantar Information is Beautiful Award – Honorable mention - Motion Infographic, Charting Culture
