= List of institutes and centers of the National Institutes of Health =

Key medical laboratories of the United States federal government

The National Institutes of Health (NIH) is an agency of the United States Department of Health and Human Services and is the primary agency of the United States government responsible for biomedical and health-related research. It comprises 27 separate institutes and centers (ICs) that carry out its mission in different areas of biomedical research. It also includes the Office of the Director, which sets policies and coordinates activities of the 27 ICs.

== Institutes ==
Name	Acronym	Description	Est.	Budget (mil)	URL
National Cancer Institute	NCI	Research and training aimed to eliminate the suffering and death due to cancer.	1937	$5,081.8	www.cancer.gov
National Institute of Allergy and Infectious Diseases	NIAID	Research goals include striving to understand, treat, and ultimately prevent infectious, immunologic, and allergic diseases. The NIAID-funded Influenza Genome Sequencing Project is a collaborative effort designed to increase the genome knowledge base of influenza and help researchers understand how flu viruses evolve, spread and cause disease.	1948	$4,512.9	www.niaid.nih.gov
National Institute of Dental and Craniofacial Research	NIDCR	Provides leadership for a national research program designed to understand, treat, and ultimately prevent infectious and inherited craniofacial-oral-dental diseases and disorders.	1948	$404.8	nidcr.nih.gov
National Institute of Diabetes and Digestive and Kidney Diseases (Note: Previously the National Institute of Arthritis, Diabetes, and Digestive and Kidney Diseases (1981–1986); National Institute of Arthritis, Metabolism, and Digestive Diseases (1972–1981); and National Institute of Arthritis and Metabolic Diseases (1950–1972).)	NIDDK	Conducts and supports research and provides leadership for a national program in diabetes, endocrinology, and metabolic diseases, digestive diseases and nutrition, and kidney, urologic, and hematologic diseases.	1950	$1,771.4	www.niddk.nih.gov
National Heart, Lung, and Blood Institute	NHLBI	Provides leadership for a national program in diseases of the heart, blood vessels, lung, and blood; blood resources; and sleep disorders. Also has administrative responsibility for the NIH Women's Health Initiative.	1948	$3,035.1	www.nhlbi.nih.gov
National Institute of Mental Health	NIMH	Understanding, treatment, and prevention of mental illnesses through basic research on the brain and behavior, and through clinical, epidemiological, and services research.	1949	$1,512.4	nimh.nih.gov
National Institute of Neurological Disorders and Stroke	NINDS	Supports and conducts research, both basic and clinical, on the normal and diseased nervous system, fosters the training of investigators in the basic and clinical neurosciences, and seeks better understanding, diagnosis, treatment, and prevention of neurological disorders.	1950	$1,656.3	ninds.nih.gov
National Library of Medicine	NLM	NLM collects, organizes, and makes available biomedical science information to investigators, educators, and practitioners and carries out programs designed to strengthen medical library services in the United States. The NLM established the National Center for Biotechnology Information (NCBI) which is a central repository of biological information and includes the PubMed literature database and the gene database GenBank. The NCBI is one of the largest components of the NLM.	1956	$341.1	www.nlm.nih.gov
National Institute of Child Health and Human Development	NICHD	NICHD researches fertility, pregnancy, growth, development, and medical rehabilitation for the promotion of all aspects of child health.	1962	$1,305.6	www.nichd.nih.gov
National Institute of General Medical Sciences	NIGMS	NIGMS supports basic biomedical research not targeted to specific diseases, funds studies on genes, proteins, and cells, supports research training programs that produce the next generation of biomedical scientists, has special programs to encourage underrepresented minorities to pursue biomedical research careers.	1962	$2,439.4	nigms.nih.gov
National Eye Institute	NEI	Conducts and supports research that helps prevent and treat eye diseases and other disorders of vision.	1968	$698.1	nei.nih.gov
National Institute of Environmental Health Sciences	NIEHS	Research on how environmental exposures, genetic susceptibility, and age interact to affect an individual's health.	1969	$675.8	niehs.nih.gov
National Institute on Alcohol Abuse and Alcoholism	NIAAA	NIAAA research is focused on improving the treatment and prevention of alcoholism and alcohol-related problems.	1970	$456.0	niaaa.nih.gov
National Institute on Drug Abuse	NIDA	NIDA supports and conducts research on drug abuse and addiction prevention, treatment, and policy.	1974	$1,050.9	nida.nih.gov
National Institute on Aging	NIA	NIA undertakes research on the biomedical, social, and behavioral aspects of the aging process, prevention of age-related diseases and disabilities, promotion of better quality of life for all older Americans.	1974	$1,518.4	nia.nih.gov
National Institute of Arthritis and Musculoskeletal and Skin Diseases	NIAMS	NIAMS supports research into causes, treatment, and prevention of arthritis and musculoskeletal and skin diseases, the training of basic and clinical scientists to carry out this research, and the dissemination of information on research progress in these diseases.	1986	$528.1	niams.nih.gov
National Institute of Nursing Research	NINR	NINR supports clinical and basic research to establish a scientific basis for the care of individuals across the life span.	1986	$142.7	www.ninr.nih.gov
National Institute on Deafness and Other Communication Disorders	NIDCD	Conducts and supports biomedical research and research training on normal mechanisms as well as diseases and disorders of hearing, balance, smell, taste, voice, speech, and language.	1988	$412.4	www.nidcd.nih.gov
National Human Genome Research Institute	NHGRI	Supports the NIH component of the Human Genome Project. NHGRI's Intramural Research Program develops and implements technology for understanding, diagnosing, and treating genetic diseases.	1989	$505.6	www.genome.gov
National Institute of Biomedical Imaging and Bioengineering	NIBIB	Promotes fundamental discoveries, design and development, and translation and assessment of technological capabilities in biomedical imaging and bioengineering, enabled by relevant areas of information science, physics, chemistry, mathematics, materials science, and computer sciences.	2000	$338.4	www.nibib.nih.gov
National Institute on Minority Health and Health Disparities (Note: Renamed in 2010; previously the National Center on Minority Health and Health Disparities (NCMHD), established 2000. NCMHD was preceded by the Office of Research on Minority Health (ORMH), legislatively established in 1993. The earlier Office of Minority Programs (OMP) had been created in 1990 at the request of the Secretary Health and Human Services.)	NIMHD	Promotes minority health, conducts and supports research, training, research infrastructure, fosters emerging programs, disseminates information, and reaches out to minority and other health disparity communities.	1993	$272.5	nimhd.nih.gov

== Centers of the NIH ==
In addition to being divided by research area, NIH has many operating groups called centers operating across all of the Institutes.

Name	Acronym	Description	Est.	Budget (mil)	URL
Center for Scientific Review	CSR	The CSR is the focal point at NIH for the conduct of initial peer review of grant and fellowship applications, implements ways to conduct referral and review.	1946	$BUDGET	www.csr.nih.gov
Clinical Center	CC	The clinical research facility of the National Institutes of Health; provides patient care, services, and environment needed to initiate and support conduct of and training in clinical research.	1953	$BUDGET	www.cc.nih.gov
National Center for Advancing Translational Sciences	NCATS	NCATS aims to catalyze the generation of innovative methods and technologies that will enhance the development, testing and implementation of diagnostics and therapeutics across a wide range of human diseases and conditions.	2011	$643.1	ncats.nih.gov
Center for Information Technology (Note: Formed in March 1998 by combining the Division of Computer Research and Technology (DCRT), the Office of Information Resources Management (OIRM), and the Telecommunications Branch.)	CIT	The CIT incorporates computers into the biomedical programs and administrative procedures of the NIH by conducting computational biosciences research, developing computer systems, and providing computer facilities.	1964	$BUDGET	cit.nih.gov
John E. Fogarty International Center	FIC	FIC promotes and supports scientific research and training internationally to reduce disparities in global health.	1968	$68.6	www.fic.nih.gov
National Center for Complementary and Integrative Health (Note: Until 2015, called the National Center for Complementary and Alternative Medicine (NCCAM). NCCAM was preceded by the Office of Alternative Medicine (OAM), established in 1992.)	NCCIH	NCCIH explores complementary and alternative medical practices in the context of rigorous science, training researchers, and disseminating authoritative information.	1999	$127.6	nccih.nih.gov
National Center for Medical Rehabilitation Research	NCMRR	NCMRR fosters development of scientific knowledge needed to enhance the health, productivity, independence, and quality-of-life of people with physical disabilities.	1991	$BUDGET	nichd.nih.gov/ncmrr
National Center for Research Resources (Note: Merger of the Division of Research Resources and the Division of Research Services)	NCRR	NCRR provided funding to laboratory scientists and researchers for facilities and tools in the goal of curing and treating diseases.	1990 (extinct 2011)		www.ncrr.nih.gov

== Office of the Director ==
The Office of the Director is the central office at NIH. The OD is responsible for setting policy for NIH and for planning, managing, and coordinating the programs and activities of all the NIH components. Program offices in the Office of the Director are responsible for stimulating specific areas of research throughout NIH and for planning and supporting research and related activities. Current program areas are: minority health, women's health, AIDS research, disease prevention, and behavioral and social sciences research. In July 2009, President Barack Obama nominated Dr. Francis S. Collins, M.D., PhD, to be the Director of the NIH. On August 7, 2009, the US Senate confirmed Collins by a unanimous vote.

Program offices within the Office of the Director fund research through the institutes:

Full name	Acronym	RoleRes	URL
Division of Program Coordination, Planning, and Strategic Initiatives	DPCPSI	plans and implements intra-NIH initiatives supported by the NIH Common Fund and coordinates research related to AIDS, behavioral and social sciences, women's health, disease prevention, and research infrastructure. DPCPSI was formally established within the Office of the Director as part of implementing the requirements of the NIH Reform Act of 2006.	dpcpsi.nih.gov
Office of Extramural Research	OER	provides guidance to institutes in research and training programs conducted through extramural programs (that is, grant, contract, or cooperative agreement programs).	grants.nih.gov/grants/oer.htm
Office of Intramural Research	OIR	coordinates research conducted directly by NIH personnel through intramural programs.	oir.nih.gov
Office of Management	OM	responsible for management and financial functions of the NIH.	om.od.nih.gov
Office of Administration	OA	advises the NIH Director and staff on administration and management; develops and implements policies, and provides oversight in the areas of information resources management, management assessment, grant administration and contract management, procurement, and logistics	
Office of AIDS Research	OAR	formulates scientific policy for, and recommends allocation of research resources for AIDS research at NIH. OAR is housed within DPCPSI.	www.oar.nih.gov
Office of Biotechnology Activities	OBA	"monitors scientific progress in human genetics research in order to anticipate future developments, including ethical, legal, and social concerns, in basic and clinical research involving Recombinant DNA, Genetic Technologies, and Xenotransplantation"	osp.od.nih.gov/office-biotechnology-activities/oba/
Office of Behavioral and Social Sciences Research	OBSSR	advises the NIH Director and other key officials on matters relating to research on the role of human behavior in the development of health, prevention of disease, and therapeutic intervention. OBSSR is housed within the Division of Program Coordination, Planning, and Strategic Initiatives (DPCPSI), Office of the Director (OD), National Institutes of Health (NIH).	obssr.od.nih.gov
Office of Communications and Public Liaison	OCPL	advises the Director and communicates information about NIH policies, programs, and research results to the general public	www.nih.gov/institutes-nih/nih-office-director/office-communications-public-liaison
Office of Community Liaison	OCL	advises the Director, plans, directs and oversees activities to promote collaboration between NIH and its community, and ensures effective communication on policy and programs involving the community	ocl.od.nih.gov
Office of Dietary Supplements	ODS	ODS is housed within DPCPSI. "The mission of ODS is to strengthen knowledge and understanding of dietary supplements by evaluating scientific information, stimulating and supporting research, disseminating research results, and educating the public to foster an enhanced quality of life and health for the U.S. population." ODS was created in 1995 as authorized by the Dietary Supplement Health and Education Act of 1994 (Pub. L. 103–417, DSHEA).	ods.od.nih.gov
Office of Disease Prevention	ODP	coordinates NIH activities regarding the application of research to disease prevention, nutrition and medical practice. The ODP is housed within the Division of Program Coordination, Planning, and Strategic Initiatives (DPCPSI), Office of the Director (OD), National Institutes of Health (NIH).	prevention.nih.gov
Office of Intramural Training and Education	OITE	provides a comprehensive guide to postdoctoral training opportunities available at the NIH	www.training.nih.gov
Office of Evaluation, Performance, and Reporting	OEPR	provides resources and coordination to better capture, communicate, and enhance the value of NIH research through strategic planning, performance monitoring, evaluation, and reporting. OEPR is housed within DPCPSI	dpcpsi.nih.gov/oepr
Office of Financial Management	OFM	advises the NIH Director and staff and provides leadership and direction for NIH financial management activities; develops policies and instructions for budget preparation and presentation and administers allocation of funds and manages a system of fund and budgetary controls.	ofm.od.nih.gov
Office of Human Resources	OHR	advises the NIH Director and staff on human resource management; directs central human resource management services; and provides NIH leadership and planning on human resource program development.	hr.od.nih.gov
Office of Legislative Policy and Analysis	OLPA	provides legislative analysis, policy development, and liaison with the United States Congress.	olpa.od.nih.gov
Office of Portfolio Analysis	OPA	OPA is an interdisciplinary team that impacts NIH-supported research by enabling NIH decision makers and research administrators to evaluate and prioritize current and emerging areas of research that will advance NIH's mission. OPA is housed within DPCPSI.	dpcpsi.nih.gov/opa
Office of Research Infrastructure Programs	ORIP	advances the NIH mission by supporting research infrastructure and research-related resource programs. OAR is housed within DPCPSI.	orip.nih.gov
Office of Research on Women's Health	ORWH	serves as a focal point for women's health research at the NIH. The ORWH promotes, stimulates, and supports efforts to improve the health of women through biomedical and behavioral research. ORWH works in partnership with the NIH institutes and centers to ensure that women's health research is part of the scientific framework at NIH and throughout the scientific community. This office is housed within the Division of Program Coordination, Planning, and Strategic Initiatives (DPCPSI), Office of the Director (OD), National Institutes of Health (NIH).	orwh.od.nih.gov
Office of Strategic Coordination	OSC	oversees the NIH Common Fund. OSC is housed within the Division of Program Coordination, Planning, and Strategic Initiatives (DPCPSI), Office of the Director (OD), National Institutes of Health (NIH). All NIH Institutes and Centers are involved with OSC in the design, implementation, and evaluation of Common Fund programs.	commonfund.nih.gov
Office of Technology Transfer	OTT	manages the wide range of NIH and FDA intramural inventions as mandated by the Federal Technology Transfer Act and related legislation. The mission of the NIH OTT is to improve public health through the management of inventions made by NIH and FDA scientists and the development of intellectual property policies for NIH's intramural and extramural research programs. In doing so, OTT serves a leading role in public sector biomedical technology transfer policy and practice.	www.ott.nih.gov
Sexual and Gender Minority Research Office	SGMRO	since October 2016 the SGMRO, housed within the Office of the Director, has coordinated NIH-supported activities on SGM health related research projects within and outside of the NIH Institutes. They are the umbrella for all research projects covering the LGBTI communities recognized health disparity – now coded as a Sexual & Gender Minority population.	dpcpsi.nih.gov/sgmro
Tribal Health Research Office	THRO	THRO is housed within DPCPSI. Established in 2015, the office was created in recognition of the importance of ensuring meaningful input and collaboration with tribal Nations on NIH programs and policies.	dpcpsi.nih.gov/thro

== Other entities in NIH ==
=== ARPA-H ===
The Advanced Research Projects Agency for Health (ARPA-H) is an entity formerly within the Office of the United States Secretary of Health and Human Services, which was created by Congress in the Consolidated Appropriations Act, 2022. Modeled after DARPA, HSARPA, IARPA, and ARPA-E, it is intended to pursue unconventional research projects through methods not typically used by federal agencies or private sector companies. Secretary Xavier Becerra delegated ARPA-H to the NIH on May 24, 2022. It received $1 billion in appropriations in 2022, and $1.5 billion in 2023, and as of June 2023 it is requesting $2.5 billion for 2024.

== See also ==
- List of Max Planck Institutes
- Center of Advanced European Studies and Research
- Ernst Strüngmann Institute
- List of IBS Centers
