= Human Biomolecular Atlas Program =

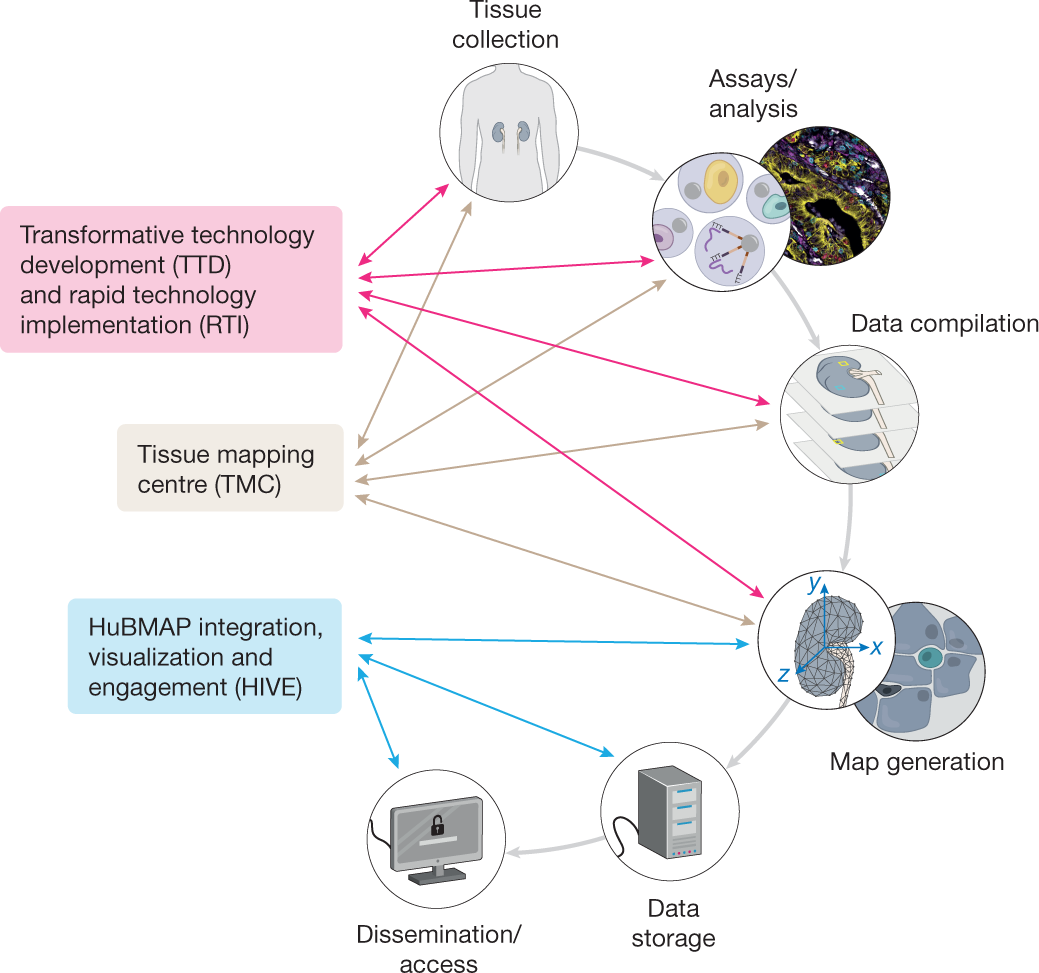
3 branches of HuBMAP: transformative technology development, the tissue mapping center and the HuBMAP integration, visualization and engagement.

The Human Biomolecular Atlas Program (HuBMAP) is a program funded by the US National Institutes of Health to characterize the human body at single cell resolution, integrated to other efforts such as the Human Cell Atlas. Among the products of the program is the Azimuth reference datasets for single-cell RNA seq data and the ASCT+B Reporter, a visualization tool for anatomical structures, cell types and biomarkers.

Millitomes are used to create uniformly sized tissue blocks that match the shape and size of organs from HuBMAP's 3D Reference Object Library.

The HuBMAP received 27 million US dollars of funding from the NIH in 2020 and about 28.5 million in 2021.

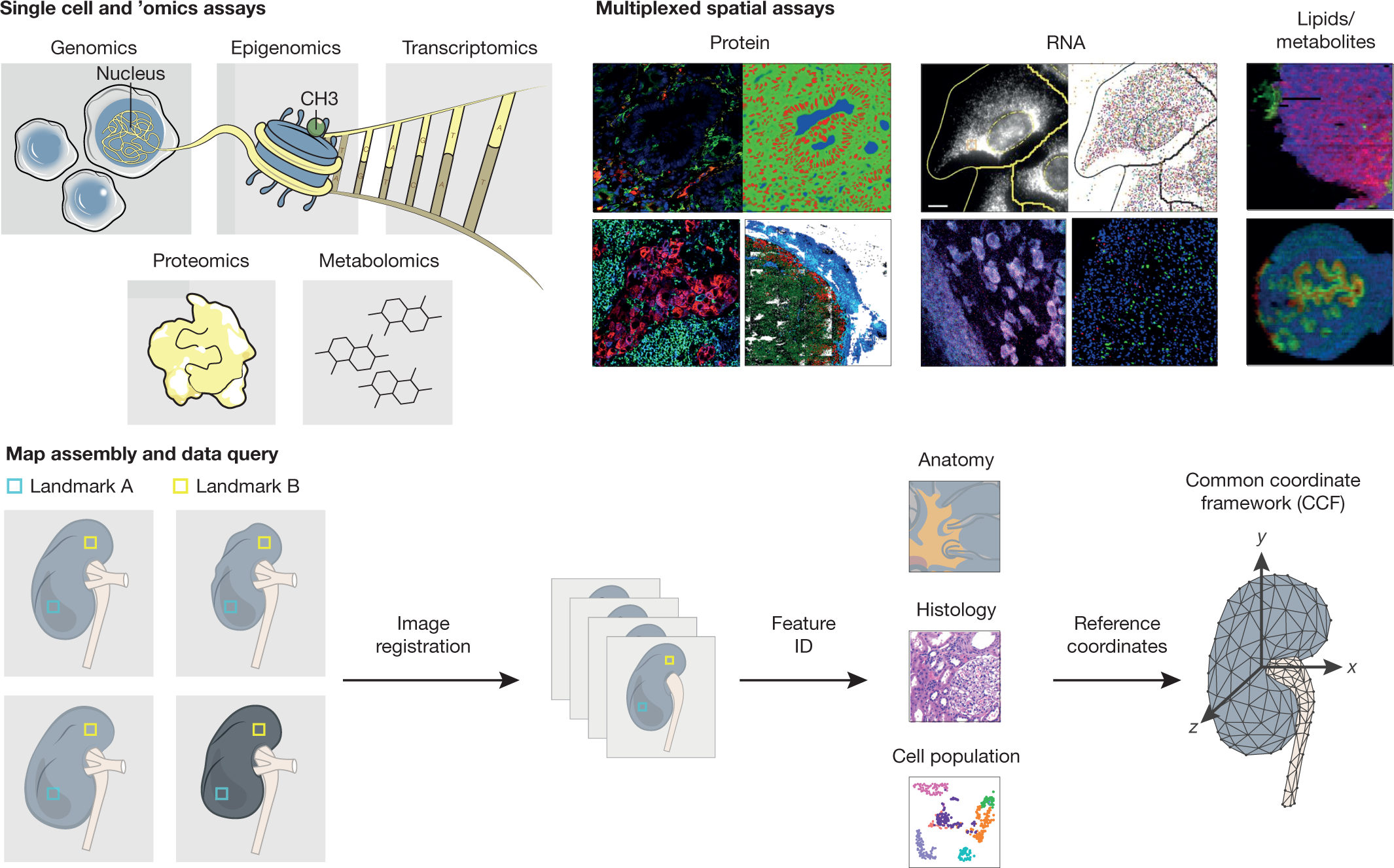
Technologies and approaches used by the HuBMAP consortium, including single-cell RNA sequencing and spatial trancriptomics.
