= Division of Program Coordination, Planning, and Strategic Initiatives =

The Division of Program Coordination, Planning, and Strategic Initiatives (DPCPSI) is a division of the Office of the Director of the National Institutes of Health of the United States of America. DPCPSI was formally established as part of implementing the requirements of the NIH Reform Act of 2006. The Division coordinates research and activities from a trans-NIH perspective.

The offices under its leadership are:

- Office of AIDS Research
- Office of Behavioral and Social Sciences Research
- Office of Data Science Strategy
- Office of Dietary Supplements
- Office of Disease Prevention
- Office of Evaluation, Performance, and Reporting
- Office of Portfolio Analysis
- Office of Research Infrastructure Programs
- Office of Research on Women's Health
- Office of Strategic Coordination
- Sexual & Gender Minority Research Office
- Tribal Health Research Office
- Office of Administrative Management and Communication.

National Institutes of Health Director Francis S. Collins, M.D., Ph.D., appointed James M. Anderson, M.D., Ph.D., as the director of the division in September 2010.

== Council of Councils ==
The NIH Reform Act of 2006 (P.L. 109–482), passed by Congress in December 2006, and signed into law by the President in January 2007, established the Council of Councils. The council is made up of 27 members, selected from NIH Institute and Centers Advisory Councils, representatives nominated by the Office of the Director program offices, and broad lay representation. The Council advises the NIH Director on matters related to the policies and activities of DPCPSI. The council also acts as an external advisory panel to the IC Directors during the “concept approval” stage of the NIH Common Fund review process. The concept approval stage involves the consideration of a list of potential trans-NIH initiatives developed by the DPCPSI staff after receiving input from multiple sources. The information provided to the council by DPCPSI staff could include deliverables, timetables, and projected costs for each initiative. The recommendations from the council will then be considered by the DPCPSI Director and the IC Directors.

The Council of Councils is chaired by the DPCPSI Director, James M. Anderson, M.D., Ph.D. The heads of the DPCPSI Offices serve as liaisons for the Council of Councils.
