= Katy Börner =

Information scientist

- Born: 1967 (age 58–59); Leipzig, Germany
- Education: University of Technology, Leipzig ( MS in electrical engineering ) University of Kaiserslautern 1997 ( PhD in computer science )
- Occupations: Engineer; Scholar; Author; Educator; Speaker
- Known for: Founding director Cyberinfrastructure for Network Science Center Fellow American Association for the Advancement of Science (AAAS)
- Notable work: Data analysis and visualization
- Awards: Inaugural Ada Lovelace Award
- Honours: Contributions to the fields of science, technology, engineering, art, and math (STEAM)

Katy Börner (born 1967 in Leipzig, Germany) is an engineer, scholar, author, educator, and speaker specializing in data analysis and visualization, particularly in the areas of science and technology (S&T) studies and biomedical applications. Based out of Indiana University, Bloomington, Börner is the Victor Yngve Distinguished Professor of Engineering & Information Science in the Department of Intelligent Systems Engineering and the Department of Information and Library Science at the Luddy School of Informatics, Computing, and Engineering and a member of the Core Cognitive Science Faculty. She has also held the position of visiting professor at the Royal Netherlands Academy of Arts and Sciences (KNAW) in Amsterdam, the Netherlands (2012–2013), a visiting professor and Mercator Fellow in User-Centered Social Media, Department of Computer Science and Applied Cognitive Science, University of Duisburg–Essen, Duisburg, Germany (2015–2018), a visiting scientist, Organisation for Economic Co-Operation and Development (OECD), Paris, France (Jan–May 2014), a Humboldt Fellow at Dresden University of Technology, Germany (2017–2019), and a Stiftung Charité Awardee & Visiting Fellow.

Börner is the founding director of the Cyberinfrastructure for Network Science Center, an organization dedicated to the study, development, and promotion of tools and services for the analysis and visualization of large-scale networks, particularly in the areas of biomedical, social, and behavioral science, physics, and technology. She is also the curator of the international Places & Spaces: Mapping Science exhibit, a collection of science maps and macroscope tools that seeks to educate the general public about science mapping and empower individuals to create their own data visualizations.

In 2015, she was appointed to a two-year term as member of the U.S. Department of Commerce's Data Advisory Council. Since October 2018, she has served as a Trustee of the Institute for Pure & Applied Mathematics (IPAM), NSF Math Institute at UCLA. Since 2023, Börner is a CIFAR MacMillan Multiscale Human Co-Director.

== Education and career ==
Börner holds an MS in electrical engineering from the University of Technology in Leipzig and earned her PhD in computer science from the University of Kaiserslautern in 1997. After one year as a Postdoc at the University of Bielefeld, Börner joined the Faculty of Computer Science at Indiana University (IU), Bloomington in 1998 and later took up primary residence on the Faculty of Information and Library Science. In 2009, she was named Victor H. Yngve Professor in the School of Library and Information Science (now the Luddy School of Informatics, Computing, and Engineering). In 2015, she was promoted to Distinguished Professor, the highest academic rank within IU.

== Atlas Series ==
Börner is widely known for her Atlas books. The Atlas trilogy covers the 100 maps from the first decade of the Places & Spaces: Mapping Science exhibit. The first, Atlas of Science: Visualizing What We Know (2010), explains the purposes and practices of science mapping, providing readers with many illustrations of the power of maps to navigate, manage, and utilize knowledge spaces. The Atlas of Science won the 2011 Best Information Science Book award from the Association for Information Science and Technology (ASIS&T) and garnered reviews in major magazines, with one reviewer writing that "Börner's magnificent book offers provocative new maps of science that will inspire fresh thinking." The second book in the series, Atlas of Knowledge: Anyone Can Map (2015), introduces a theoretical visualization framework meant to guide readers through user and task analysis; data preparation, analysis, and visualization; visualization deployment; and the interpretation of science maps. Like its predecessor, the second Atlas was greeted enthusiastically, with one review claiming, "[w]hether you read it cover to cover or just browse the extraordinary examples, you put it down inspired." Like its predecessor, the Atlas of Knowledge is abundantly illustrated, using many images from the Places & Spaces exhibit. The third book in the Atlas trilogy, Atlas of Forecasts: Predicting and Implementing Desirable Futures, was published in 2021, and was awarded the PROSE award for excellence in physical sciences and mathematics in 2022. The Atlas of Macroscopes: Interactive Data Visualizations (2025), co-authored with Elizabeth G. Record and Todd N. Theriault, covers the 40 interactive data visualizations (aka macroscopes) featured in the second decade of the exhibit.

== Creative works ==
Throughout her career, Börner has worked with artists to bring STEM to different audiences. She has collaborated closely with comic artists, visual designers, game developers, pottery artists, and illustrators.

In 2007, she collaborated with Fileve Palmer and Elisha Hardy on "Science Maps for Kids", a hands-on activity that invites children to see, explore, and understand science from above. One map shows our world and the places where science is practiced or researched. The other shows major areas of science and their complex interrelationships. Children and adults alike are invited to help solve the puzzle by placing major scientists, inventors, and inventions in their appropriate places. During 2011-2013, Börner collaborated with visual artist Ying-Fang Shen on the short film Humanexus. Serving as producer, she wrote the initial story and provided guidance and resources. The final soundtrack was added by Norbert Herber, a senior lecturer at Indiana University's Media School. The film tells the story of human communication from the Stone Age to the present day and beyond. It aims to make tangible the enormous changes in the quantity and quality of our collective knowledge and the impact of different media and distribution systems on knowledge exchange. Humanexus won numerous awards around the globe, including Third Prize at the Aviff Cannes Art Film Festival, Best Original Screenplay (Animation) at the 2014 Unofficial Google+ Film Festival, Best Short Animation at the 2014 Albany FilmFest, the Award of Excellence at the 2014 Canada International Film Festival, and the Documentary Shorts Award and Best Director Award at the 2014 Macon Film Festival.

In 2015, Börner and artist Carrie Longley collaborated on the creation of a 3-feet tall clay sculpture that gives science a physical, three-dimensional form and invites playful interaction. The result, Sculpture of Science, makes the history of science tangible and lets visitors trace the evolution of scientific ideas back to their origins using marbles placed at the contemporary top level to observe intellectual journeys into the past.

In 2023, Börner and Griffin Weber (Harvard Medical School), Katherine Gustilo (University of Colorado Anschutz Medical Campus) wrote the initial story for Human Reference Atlas: Vasculature Common Coordinate Framework (VCCF) and Ushma Patel created the animation for a short movie explaining how a latitude/longitude system for the healthy human male and female body might be constructed.

== Recognition ==
In 2012, Börner was named an American Association for the Advancement of Science (AAAS) Fellow. In 2017, Börner became a Humboldt Fellow and collaborated with colleagues at the Dresden University of Technology in Germany. In 2018, Börner was elected as an ACM Fellow for "contributions to methods and tools that enable users to render data into actionable insights." In 2019, Börner was honored with the inaugural Ada Lovelace Award by the city of Bloomington, Indiana, in recognition of her contributions to the fields of science, technology, engineering, art, and math (STEAM).

== Additional publications ==
In addition to the four books discussed above, Börner has written more than 300 articles for academic journals and scholarly texts and has edited several publications. Her major books include:

- Contributor to the Committee on Accelerating Behavioral Science Through Ontology Development and Use; National Academies of Sciences, Engineering, and Medicine. (2022) Ontologies in the Behavioral Sciences: Accelerating Research and the Spread of Knowledge. The National Academies Press. DOI: 10.17226/26464.
- K. Börner and D. Polley. (2014). Visual Insights: A Practical Guide to Making Sense of Data. The MIT Press. ISBN 978-0262526197.
- K. Börner, Y. Ding, M. Conlon, and J. Corson-Rikert, eds. (2012). VIVO: A Semantic Approach to Scholarly Networking and Discovery. Morgan & Claypool Publishers. ISBN 978-1608459933.
- A. Scharnhorst, K. Börner, and P. van den Besselaar, eds. (2011). Models of Science Dynamics: Encounters Between Complexity Theory and Information Sciences. Springer. ISBN 978-3642230677.
- Contributor to the Panel on Modernizing the Infrastructure of the National Foundation Federal Funds Survey; National Research Council of the National Academies. (2009). Data on Federal Research and Development Investment: A Pathway to Modernization. The National Academies Press. ISBN 978-0-309-14523-7.
- K. Börner and C. Chen. (2003). Visual Interfaces to Digital Libraries. Springer. ISBN 978-3540002475.
