= Cyberinfrastructure for Network Science Center =

CNS Center at IU
- Type: Public
- Industry: Data Analysis and Visualization Research
- Founded: 2005
- Headquarters: Bloomington, IN
- Key people: Katy Börner, Center Director

The Cyberinfrastructure for Network Science (CNS) Center was founded in October 2005 by Professor Katy Börner at Indiana University, Bloomington. It emerged from the Information Visualization Lab at IU that focused on the analysis and visualization of data since 1999. With the advent of CNS, the mission was broadened from providing a research lab to building an entity that would advance datasets, tools, and services for the study of biomedical, social and behavioral science, physics, and other networks. A specific focus of CNS is research on the structure and evolution of science and technology (S&T) and the communication of results via science maps.

The Center organizes international workshops and conferences, promotes network science and visualization at national and international initiatives, organizes and finances a weekly talk series on Network Science, holds an annual open house, hosts about 20 national and international visitors each year, and teaches regular workshops on its infrastructure and tools.

CNS is also the creative and administrative home of Places & Spaces: Mapping Science, an international science mapping exhibit. The collection features leading examples of knowledge domain mapping, novel location-based cartographies, data visualizations, and science-inspired art, all created by experts from around the globe.

One of the center's primary contributions is research and development of data and information visualization tools. Among these are included: the Cyberinfrastructure Shell (CIShell), the Science of Science (Sci2) Tool, the Network Workbench, the Scholarly Database, the EpiC Marketplace, MAPSustain, and others.

In addition, CNS offers several courses at Indiana University on information visualization, structural data mining and modeling, user interface design, and human-computer interaction. In January 2013, CNS offered one of the first massive open online courses (MOOC) at Indiana University. This initial course, entitled Information Visualization MOOC (or IVMOOC), attracted visitors from over 100 countries. Since then, the course has been offered yearly and there are plans for additional iterations in the future. The following year, the course spawned a companion text, Visual Insights, published by The MIT Press.
