= NIH grant =

US government grant for health research

In the United States, the National Institutes of Health (NIH) are the primary government agency responsible for biomedical and public health research. They award NIH grants through 24 grant-awarding institutes and centers.

The NIH supports $31 billion in research annually, given to more than 300,000 researchers at more than 2,500 institutions for research into a variety of conditions. Each institute of the NIH has separate appropriations from Congress determined on an annual basis. Percentages of grant applications funded vary by institute, from 8% (National Institute of Nursing Research) to 29.6% (National Institute of General Medical Sciences), with an overall average of 18%. Funding percentages have dropped from over 30% in the early 2000s, mainly due to an increase in applications, rather than a decrease in funds available. In 1998, 24,100 applications were received, and 7,500 were funded with a total of $1.9 billion. By 2005, the number of applications had grown to 43,000, of which 9,600 were funded with a total of $3.4 billion. In 2015, 52,000 applications were submitted and 9,500 were funded with $4.3 billion. Grants are assessed based on their significance, innovation, and approach.

The major grant awards of the NIH are divided into Research Grants (R series), Career Development Awards (K series), Research Training and Fellowships (T & F series), Program Project/Center Grants (P series), and miscellaneous programs.

There are various requirements for grants. Some grants are specified for "new investigators", which is defined as someone who has not received a prior NIH grant other than a career award or specific small grants (R15, R21, R56, etc.). An "early stage investigator" is someone who has received their PhD or MD or has finished residency within the past 10 years.

The National Institute of Health maintains an open-access database NIH reporter, that provides information on NIH-funded research including titles, principal investigators, and abstracts. One purpose of the REPORTER is to get potential grant applicants "a snapshot of one’s field including possible collaborators and competitors".

== Impact on scientific research ==
From 2010 to 2016, NIH funded research that led to the development and approval of 210 new drugs. 84 of these were "first-in-class" drugs, meaning they work through previously unknown mechanisms. About 90% of the research published from the funded grants related to the discovery and characterization of these pathways, rather than the development of the drug itself.

A study on the value of public research funding found that 30% of NIH grants led to research being published that was cited in a patent application, and that for every $100 million funded by the NIH, 23 patents were submitted.

== Application process ==
NIH numbers the types of applications:

- Type 1 – New grant applications for a project not currently funded.
- Type 2 – Competitive renewal of grants currently funded. Applications are essentially the same as for type 1 applications.
- Type 3 – Competitive revision of grants currently funded. Investigators can request additional funding for current grants for additional research or unforeseen costs.
- Type 4 – Extension of grants currently funded.
- Type 5 – Noncompetitive continuation of a current grant. Investigators must submit progress reports to receive continued funding.
- Type 6 – Change of organization status (Successor-In-Interest). Relevant during legal transfer of investigator assets or corporate mergers, for example.
- Type 7 – Change of grantee or training institution during current funding period of grant.
- Type 8 – Change of awarding NIH institute or center for type 5 noncompetitive continuations.
- Type 9 – Change of awarding NIH institute or center for type 2 competitive renewal of grants currently funded.

Applications are reviewed by a Scientific Review Group made up of volunteer subject matter experts, generally professors in the relevant fields, and by a National Advisory Council made up of federal employees. Grants are scored from 1 to 9, with 1 being the highest score. Members of the committees are listed publicly.

== Funding mechanisms ==
=== R01 ===
The most common research grant mechanism is the R01. It is the oldest funding mechanism of the NIH. R01s are generally awarded for 3–5 years, and are used to support a "discrete, specified, circumscribed research project". R01s can be renewed by competitive application. The application cycle has 3 sets of application dates each year. Standard due dates for new grant applications are February, June, and October 5, and for renewal, resubmission, and revision grant applications are March, July, and November 5. AIDs-related grants have separate due dates. All grant-awarding institutes and centers award R01s. Applications for R01s are complex and are typically over 100 pages by submission.

In financial year 2016, the NIH received 26,187 applications for new R01 grants. 17.3% were funded, for a total of $2.2 billion. The average annual budget was $460,000.

=== Research project grants ===
Other research grant programs include:

- R03, the NIH Small Grant Program, not renewable and limited to 2 years, with a maximum of $50k/year.
- R13, NIH Support for Conferences and Scientific Meetings
- R15, NIH Academic Research Enhancement Award (AREA), supports small research projects limited to a total of $300k over up to 3 years, at universities in the US that have not received more than $6 million from the NIH per year.
- R21, NIH Exploratory/Developmental Research Grant Award, limited to 2 years of funding for a total less than $275k, and does not require preliminary data.
- R33, Exploratory/Developmental Grants Phase II, available to R21 awardees
- R34, NIH Clinical Trial Planning Grant Program
- R35, Outstanding Investigator Award
- R36, Dissertation Award
- R37, NIH MERIT award
- R41, Small Business Technology Transfer (STTR) Grants-Phase I
- R42, Small Business Technology Transfer (STTR) Grants- Phase II
- R43, Small Business Innovation Research (SBIR) Grants-Phase I
- R44, Small Business Innovation Research (SBIR) Grants-Phase II
- R56, NIH High Priority, Short-Term Project Award, "bridge grant", funds applications for R01s that did not receive a qualifying score but are compelling. This award cannot be applied for.
- SB1, Commercialization Readiness Program, also known as Small Business Innovation Research (SBIR) Grants-Phase III
- U01, Research Project Cooperative Agreement
- U10, Cooperative Clinical Research Cooperative Agreements

=== Program project/center grants ===
- P01, Research Program Project Grant
- P20, Exploratory Grants
- P30, Center Core Grants
- P41, Biotechnology Resource Grant
- P50, Specialized Center
- RC2, High Impact Research and Research Infrastructure Programs
- C06, Research Construction Programs, for the construction or remodeling of research facilities
- DP1, NIH Director's Pioneer Award
- DP2, NIH Director's New Innovator Awards
- DP5, Early Independence Award

=== Resource grants ===
- R24 Resource-Related Research Projects
- R25 Education Projects
- R50, Research Specialist Award, to support the salaries of non-PI scientists
- X01 Resource Access Program

=== Training grants ===
- T15, Continuing Education Training Program
- T32, Institutional National Research Service Award
- T34, Undergraduate NRSA Institutional Research Training Grants
- T35, Medical students engaging in a short-term research project
- T90, Support for interdisciplinary research training programs
- F32, Individual National Research Service Award (postdoctoral)
- F30, Individual Ruth L. Kirschstein NRSA for individual MD/PhD Fellows (predoctoral)
- F31, Individual NRSA support for students in doctoral programs

=== Career development awards ===
- K01 Research Scientist Career Development Award
- K02 Independent Research Scientist Development Award
- K05 Senior Research Scientist Award
- K07 Academic Career Development Award
- K08 Mentored Clinical Scientist Research Career Development Award
- K12 Clinical Scientist Institutional Career Development Program Award
- K18 Research Career Enhancement Award for Established Investigators
- K22 Career Transition Development Award
- K23 Mentored Patient-Oriented Research Career Development Award
- K24 Midcareer Investigator Award in Patient-Oriented Research
- K25 Mentored Quantitative Research Career Development Award
- K26 Midcareer Investigator Award in Biomedical and Behavioral Research
- K43 Emerging Global Leader Award
- K76 Emerging Leaders Career Development Award
- K99 Pathway to Independence Award, for postdoctoral researchers
