= National Institutes of Health Common Fund =

The National Institutes of Health Common Fund is an initiative of the National Institutes of Health (NIH) aimed at supporting research collaboration between two or more NIH institutes and centers (ICs). The fund offers flexible support for cutting edge, multidisciplinary, multi-investigator and higher risk research. It is intended to streamline US biomedical research and make it more flexible in response to society's health needs. The high-impact programs it supports are known collectively as the "NIH Roadmap for Medical Research". It is coordinated by the Office of Strategic Coordination, one of the six offices of the Division of Program Coordination, Planning, and Strategic Initiatives (DPCPSI) within the Office of the Director.

Common Fund programs are expected to transform the way a broad spectrum of health research is conducted. Initiatives that comprise Common Fund programs are intended to be catalytic in nature by providing limited term investments in strategic areas to stimulate further research through IC-funded mechanisms.

NIH Common Fund programs

- must have high potential to dramatically affect biomedical and/or behavioral research over the next decade
- must achieve a defined set of high impact goals within a defined period of time
- outcomes must synergistically promote and advance individual missions of NIH Institutes and Centers to benefit health
- areas must cut across missions of multiple NIH Institutes and Centers, be relevant to multiple diseases or conditions, and be sufficiently complex to require a coordinated, trans-NIH approach
- must be something no other entity is likely or able to do

== History ==
On 15 January 2007, The NIH Reform Act was signed into law by President George W. Bush after a delay of 14 years partly due to conflict over stem cell research. The act, among other things, established the Common Fund (to be used at the discretion of the Director on projects of his or her choosing), the Council of Councils (27 members representing the advisory councils of each of the ICs to advise on which research proposals should be funded by the Common Fund), and the Office of Portfolio Analysis and Strategic Initiatives (that, among other things, develops and manages projects supported by the Common Fund). Until then, if the Director had wanted to support a preferred program he or she had had to persuade an individual institute director or group of directors to provide the funds.

In 2008, the NIH released a "Request for Information (RFI): To Solicit Ideas for Common Fund/Roadmap Trans-NIH Strategic Initiatives," soliciting ideas from the scientific, medical and patient advocate communities about the kinds of initiatives to be supported by the fund.

=== Notable funded programs ===
- Protein Capture Reagents program (2010–2015); "focused on binders to transcription factors and chromatin-associated proteins".

== Budget ==
Provided the NIH budget grows ahead of the annual inflation rate, the legislation allows the Common Fund to use up to five percent of the NIH budget.
