= Places & Spaces: Mapping Science =

Science exhibition about maps

Places & Spaces: Mapping Science is a science exhibition that aims to demonstrate the power of maps to analyse, organize, and visualize abstract intellectual spaces. The exhibit showcases high-resolution maps that represent complex data in a visually understandable format. The maps featured in Places & Spaces were created by a global collection of experts in the fields of scientometrics, the natural, physical, and social sciences, visual arts, socio-political policymaking, and the humanities. By the end of 2014, the exhibit had collected 100 maps and various additional elements. The latter include Ingo Günther's Worldprocessor Globes, an illuminated diagram display, the Gapminder Card Game, hands-on science maps for kids, and the award-winning short film Humanexus.

Each year, the exhibition's international advisory board hosted a competitive selection process to choose ten new maps focused around a central theme. The ten iterations, each of which collected ten maps, were published in three books, along with several macroscopes collected by the exhibit:

- 1st Iteration (2005): The Power of Maps
- 2nd Iteration (2006): The Power of Reference Systems
- 3rd Iteration (2007): The Power of Forecasts
- 4th Iteration (2008): Science Maps for Economic Decision Makers
- 5th Iteration (2009): Science Maps for Science Policy Makers
- 6th Iteration (2010): Science Maps for Scholars
- 7th Iteration (2011): Science Maps as Visual Interfaces to Digital Libraries
- 8th Iteration (2012): Science Maps for Kids
- 9th Iteration (2013): Science Maps Showing Trends and Dynamics
- 10th Iteration (2014): The Future of Science Mapping

== History ==
The exhibit was envisioned by Katy Börner, Sarah I. Fabrikant, Deborah MacPerson and André Skupin in January 2005, and it debuted at the Annual Meeting of the Association of American Geographers in April of that year. As of June 2023, the exhibit has been on display at over 382 venues in 28 countries on 6 continents. It showcases the work of 248 mapmakers that hail from 17 countries. Places & Spaces functions as an outreach component of the Cyberinfrastructure for Network Science Center, which is housed at the School of Informatics and Computing at Indiana University.
