= National Institutes of Health =

US government medical research agency

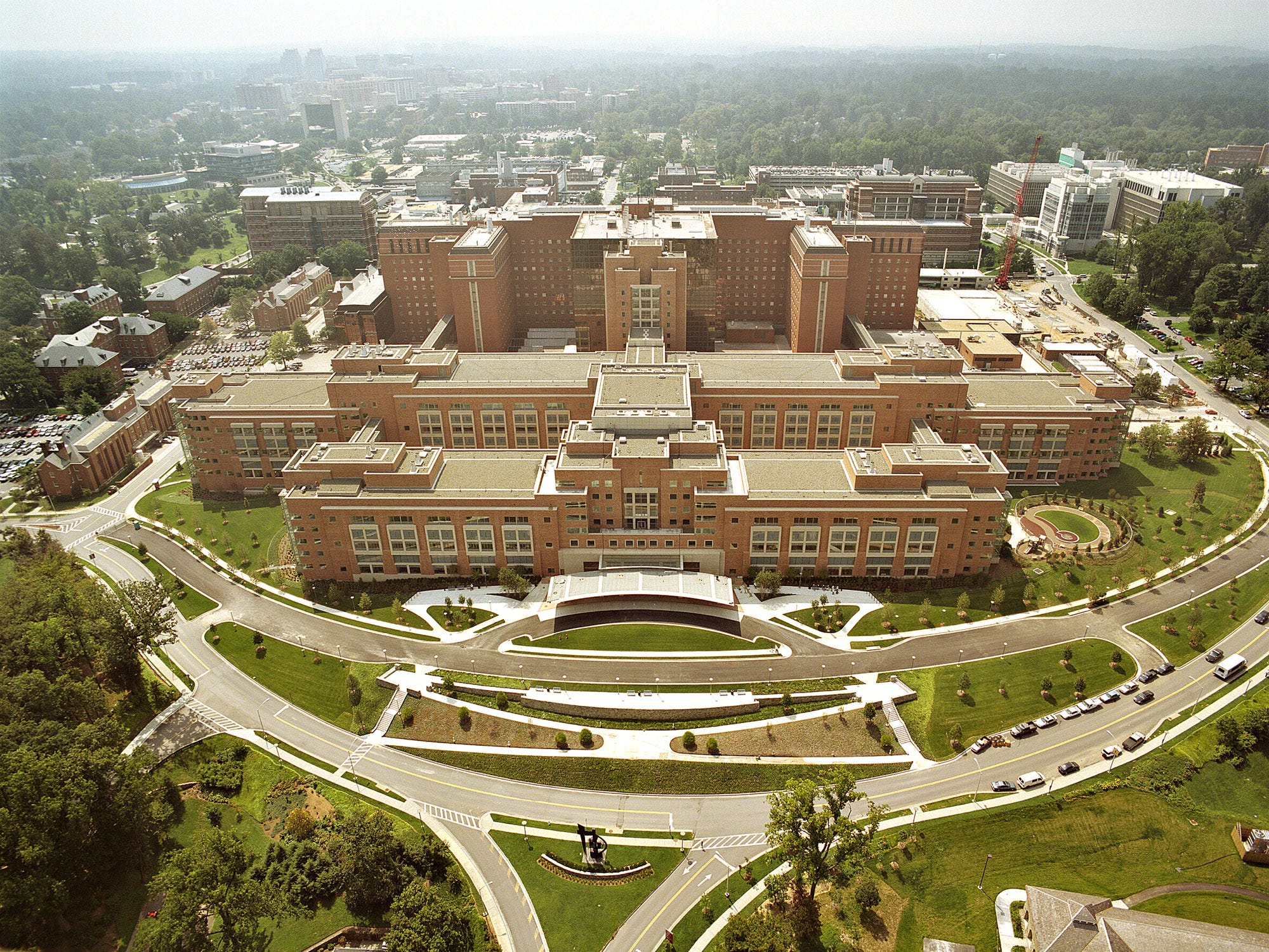
- Aerial photo of the NIH Mark O. Hatfield Clinical Research Center in Bethesda, Maryland

Agency overview
- Formed: August 1887; 139 years ago
- Preceding agency: Hygienic Laboratory
- Headquarters: Bethesda, Maryland, U.S.; 39°00′09″N 77°06′16″W
- Employees: 18,478 (2021),
- Annual budget: $45 billion (2022)
- Agency executives: Jay Bhattacharya, Director; Matthew Memoli, Principal Deputy Director
- Parent agency: Department of Health & Human Services
- Child agencies: National Cancer Institute; National Institute of Allergy and Infectious Diseases; National Institute of Diabetes and Digestive and Kidney Diseases; National Heart, Lung, and Blood Institute; National Library of Medicine
- Website: nih.gov

The National Institutes of Health (NIH) is the primary agency of the United States federal government responsible for biomedical and public health research. It was founded in 1887 and is part of the United States Department of Health and Human Services (HHS). Many NIH facilities are located in Bethesda, Maryland, and other nearby suburbs of the Washington metropolitan area, with other primary facilities in Research Triangle Park in North Carolina and smaller satellite facilities located around the United States.

The NIH conducts its scientific research through the NIH Intramural Research Program (IRP) and provides significant biomedical research funding to non-NIH research facilities through its Extramural Research Program. As of 2013, the IRP had 1,200 principal investigators and more than 4,000 postdoctoral fellows in basic, translational, and clinical research, being the largest biomedical research institution in the world, while, as of 2003, the extramural arm provided 28% of biomedical research funding spent annually in the U.S., or about US$26.4 billion. Basic research by the NIH contributed to every new drug approved by the Federal Drug Administration over the period 2010–2016. In early 2025, the Trump administration froze key NIH operations, and by January 2026 about 2,600 grants totaling $1.4 billion remained suspended, though some were reinstated due to court orders.

The NIH is responsible for many scientific accomplishments, including the discovery of fluoride to prevent tooth decay, the use of lithium to manage bipolar disorder, and the creation of vaccines against hepatitis, Haemophilus influenzae (HIB), and human papillomavirus (HPV). In 2012, the NIH comprised 27 separate institutes and centers of different biomedical disciplines.

In 2019, the NIH was ranked number two in the world, behind Harvard University, for biomedical sciences in the Nature Index, which measured the largest contributors to papers published in a subset of leading journals from 2015 to 2018.

== History ==
=== Origins ===
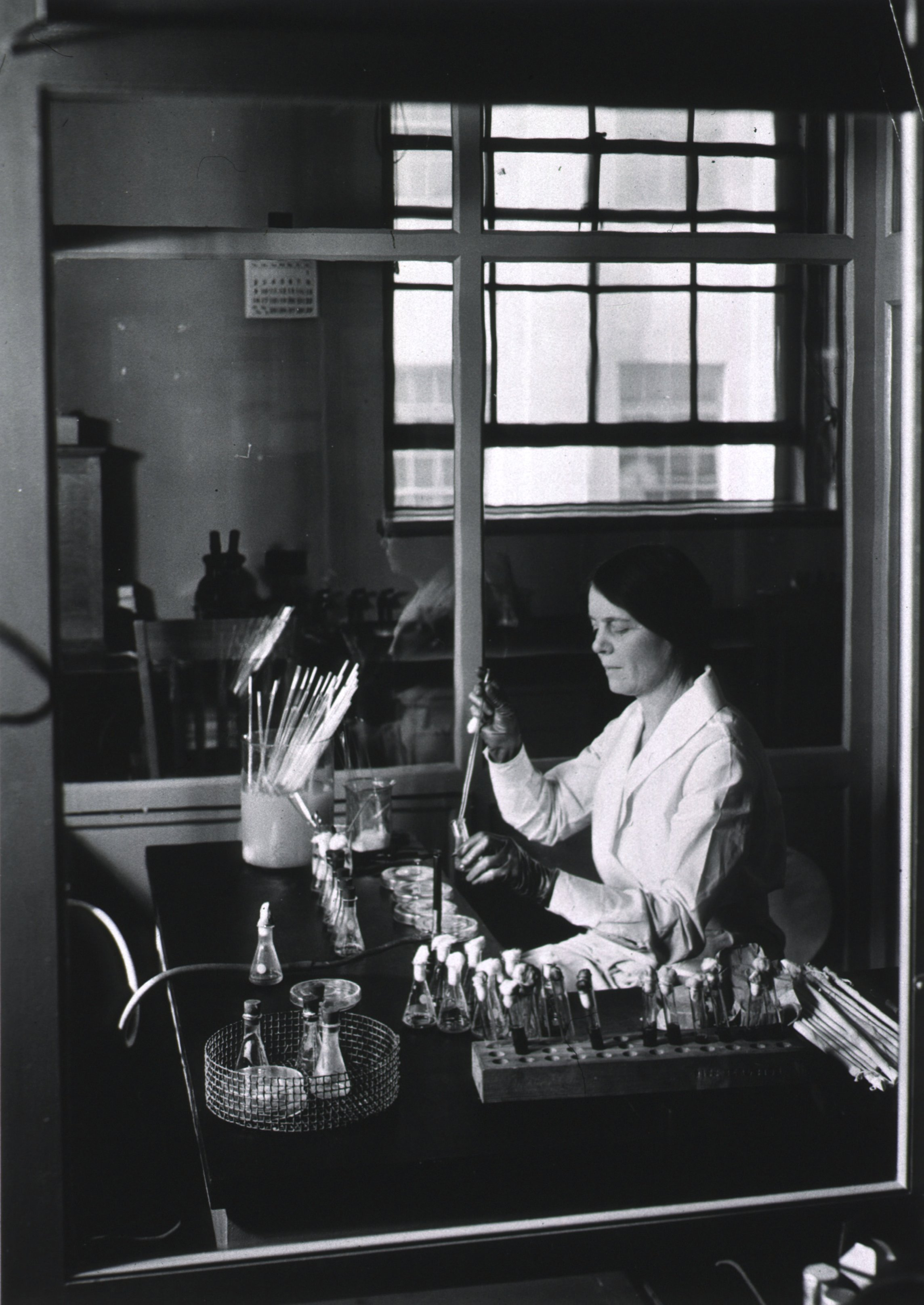
Ida A. Bengtson, a bacteriologist who in 1916 was the first woman hired to work in the Hygienic Laboratory

Dedication of first six NIH buildings by President Franklin D. Roosevelt in 1940

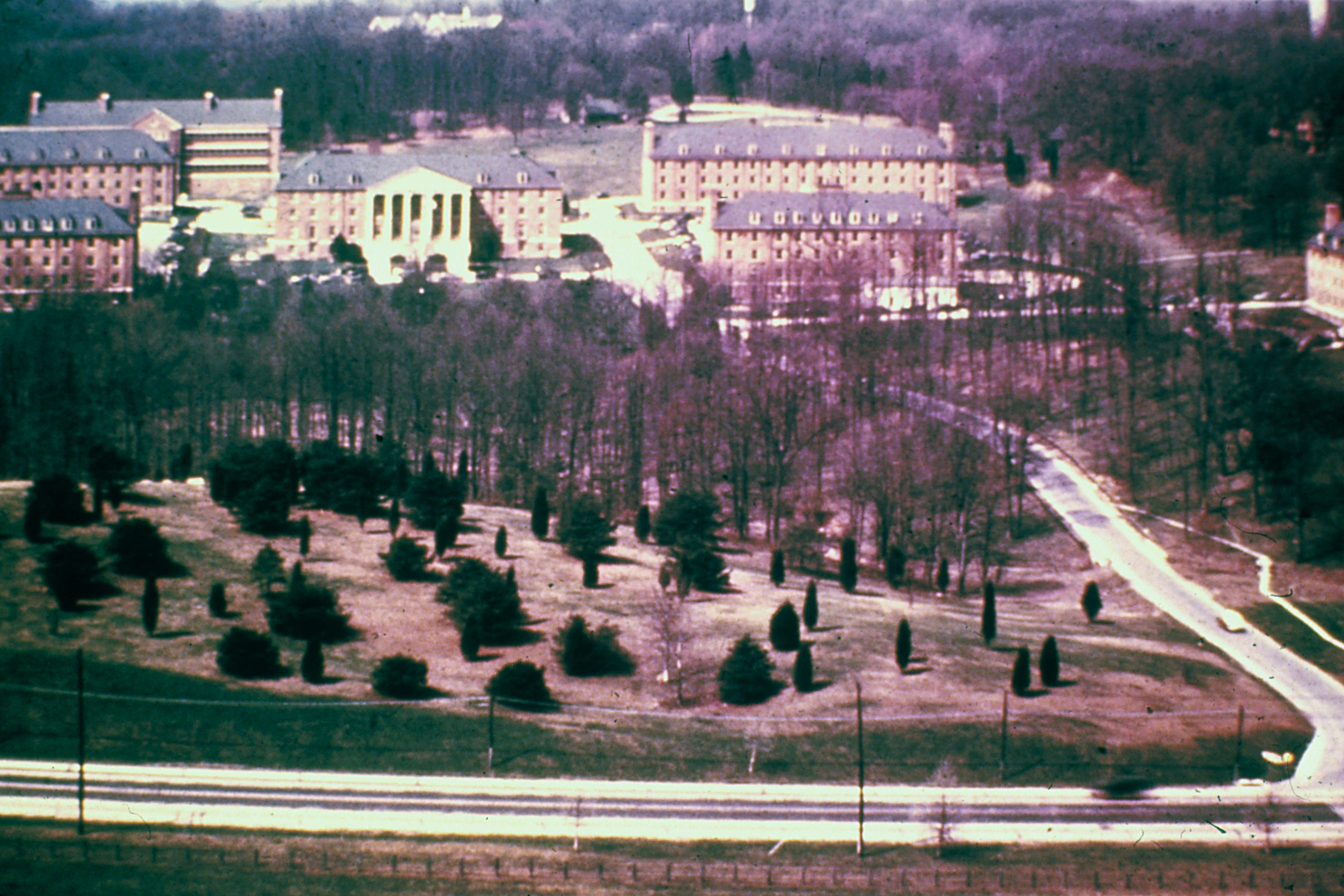
NIH campus in Bethesda, Maryland, in 1945

In 1887, a laboratory for the study of bacteria, the Hygienic Laboratory, was established within the Marine Hospital Service, which at the time was expanding its functions beyond the system of Marine Hospitals into quarantine and research programs. It was initially located at the New York Marine Hospital on Staten Island. In 1891, it moved to the top floor of the Butler Building in Washington, D.C. In 1904, it moved again to a new campus at the Old Naval Observatory, which grew to include five major buildings.

In 1901, the Division of Scientific Research was formed, which included the Hygienic Laboratory as well as other research offices of the Marine Hospital Service. In 1912, the Marine Hospital Service became the Public Health Service (PHS). In 1922, PHS established a Special Cancer Investigations laboratory at Harvard Medical School. This development marked the beginning of partnerships with universities.

In 1930, the Hygienic Laboratory was re-designated as the National Institute of Health by the Ransdell Act, and was given $750,000 to construct two NIH buildings at the Old Naval Observatory campus. In 1937, the NIH absorbed the rest of the Division of Scientific Research, of which it was formerly part.

In 1938, the NIH moved to its current campus in Bethesda, Maryland. Over the next few decades, Congress would markedly increase funding of the NIH. Various institutes and centers within the NIH were created for specific research programs. In 1944, the Public Health Service Act was approved and the National Cancer Institute became a division of the NIH. In 1948, the name changed from National Institute of Health to National Institutes of Health.

=== Later history ===
In the 1960s, virologist and cancer researcher Chester M. Southam injected HeLa cancer cells into patients at the Jewish Chronic Disease Hospital. When three doctors resigned after refusing to inject patients without their consent, the experiment gained considerable media attention. The NIH was a major source of funding for Southam's research and required all research involving human subjects to obtain their consent before any experimentation. Upon investigating all of their grantee institutions, the NIH discovered that the majority of them did not protect the rights of human subjects. From then on, the NIH has required all grantee institutions to approve any research proposals involving human experimentation with review boards.

In 1967, the Division of Regional Medical Programs was created to administer grants for research for heart disease, cancer, and strokes. That same year, the NIH director lobbied the White House for increased federal funding to increase research and the speed with which health benefits could be brought to the people. An advisory committee was formed to oversee the further development of the NIH and its research programs. By 1971, cancer research was in full force, and President Nixon signed the National Cancer Act, initiating a National Cancer Program, President's Cancer Panel, National Cancer Advisory Board, and 15 new research, training, and demonstration centers.

Funding for the NIH has often been a source of contention in the US Congress, serving as a proxy for the political currents of the time. In 1992, the NIH encompassed nearly one percent of the federal government's operating budget and controlled more than 50 percent of all funding for health research, and 85 percent of all funding for health studies in universities. While government funding for research in other disciplines has been increasing at a rate similar to inflation since the 1970s, research funding for the NIH nearly tripled through the 1990s and early 2000s, but has remained relatively stagnant since then.

By the 1990s, the NIH committee focus had shifted to DNA research and launched the Human Genome Project.

On January 22, 2025, the Trump administration imposed an immediate freeze on meetings – such as grant review panels – as well as travel, communications, and hiring at the NIH, affecting $47.4 billion worth of activities. One year into Trump's second term, more than 5,800 NIH grants were cancelled or suspended at some point. Some grants were reinstated after court rulings, but as of January 2026 around 2,600 grants ($1.4 billion) are still suspended.

== Leadership ==
The NIH Office of the Director is the central office responsible for setting policy for the NIH, and for planning, managing, and coordinating the programs and activities of all NIH components. The NIH Director plays an active role in shaping the agency's activities and outlook. The Director is responsible for providing leadership to the Institutes and Centers by identifying needs and opportunities, especially in efforts involving multiple Institutes. Within the Director's Office is the Division of Program Coordination, Planning and Strategic Initiatives with 12 divisions including:

- Office of AIDS Research
- Office of Research on Women's Health
- Office of Disease Prevention
- Sexual and Gender Minority Research Office
- Tribal Health Research Office
- Office of Program Evaluation and Performance

The Agency Intramural Research Integrity Officer "is directly responsible for overseeing the resolution of all research misconduct allegations involving intramural research, and for promoting research integrity within the NIH Office of Intramural Research (OIR)." There is a Division of Extramural Activities, which has its own Director. The Office of Ethics has its own Director, as does the Office of Global Research.

== Locations and campuses ==
Intramural research is primarily conducted at the main campus in Bethesda, Maryland, and Rockville, Maryland, and the surrounding communities.

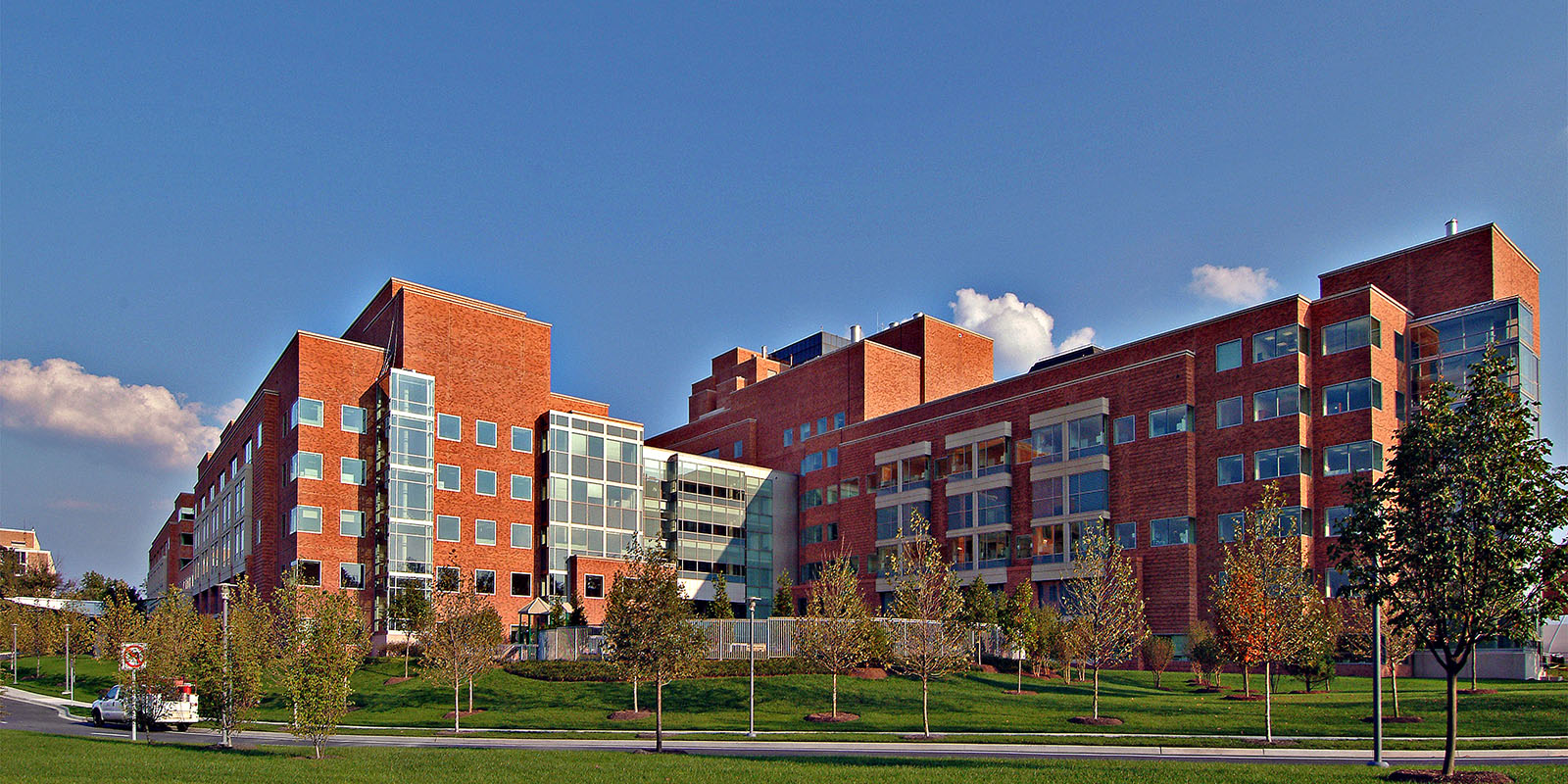
Clinical Research Center at the NIH

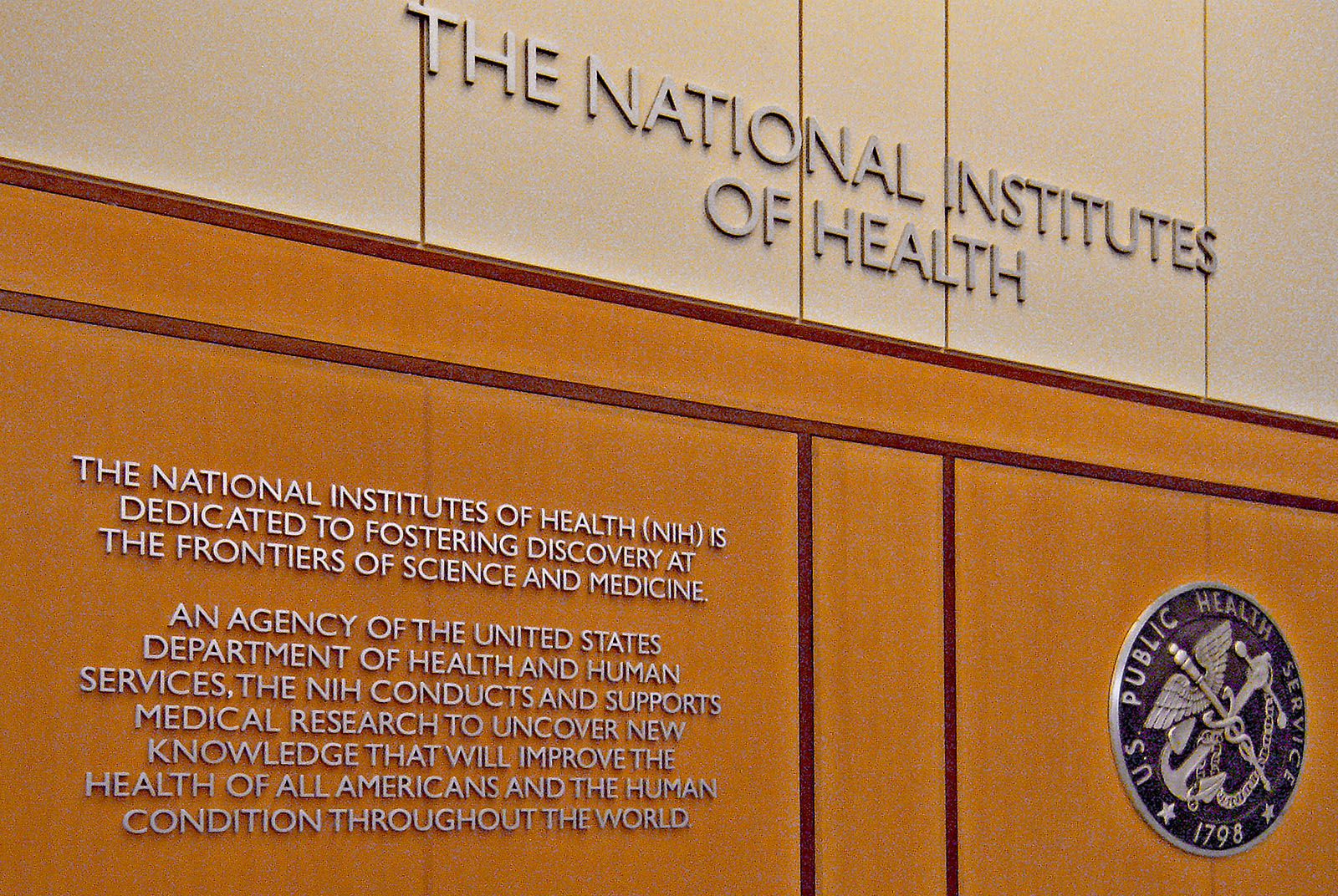
Main Lobby Wall at the Clinical Research Center at the NIH

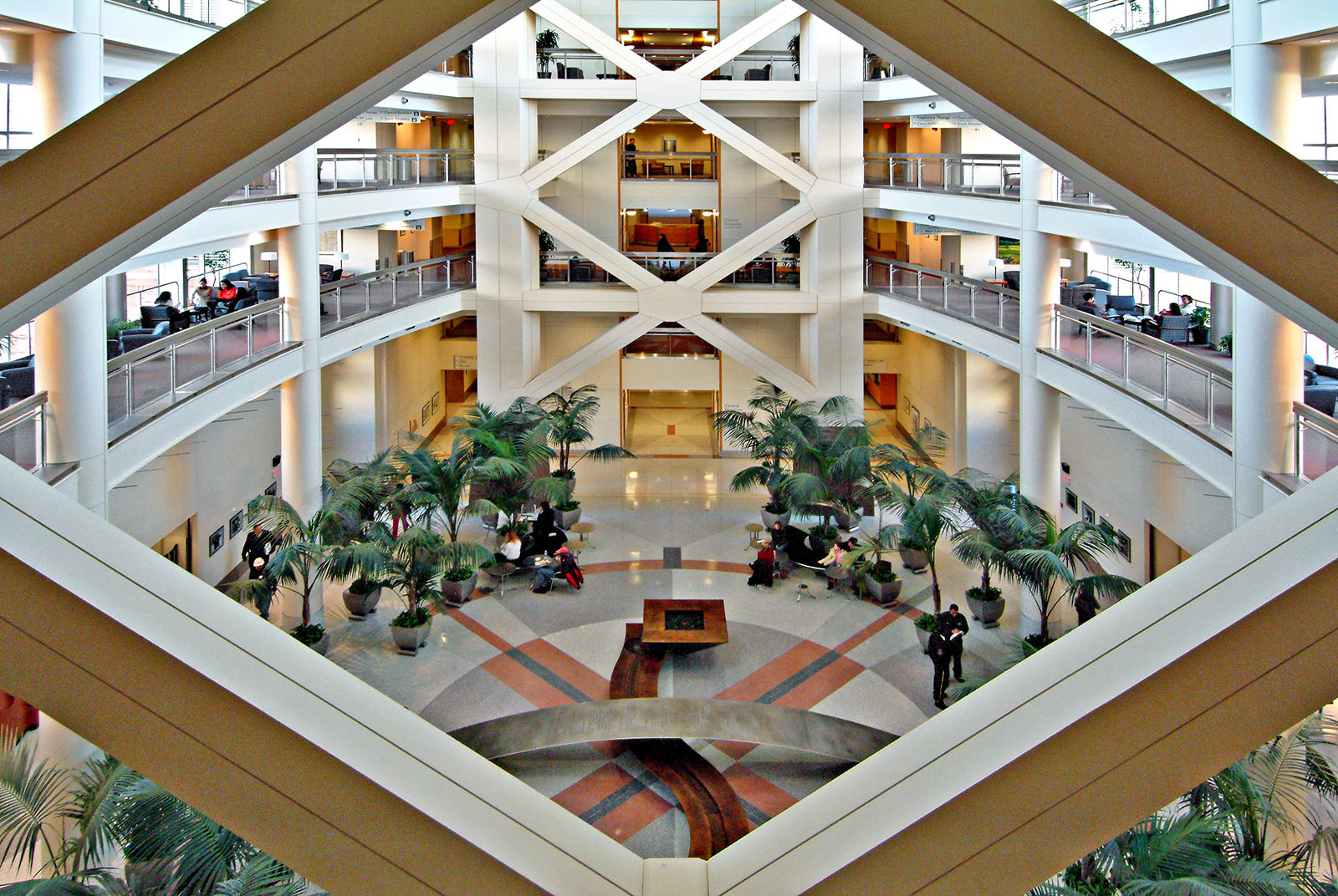
Looking at the Main Lobby at the Clinical Research Center at NIH

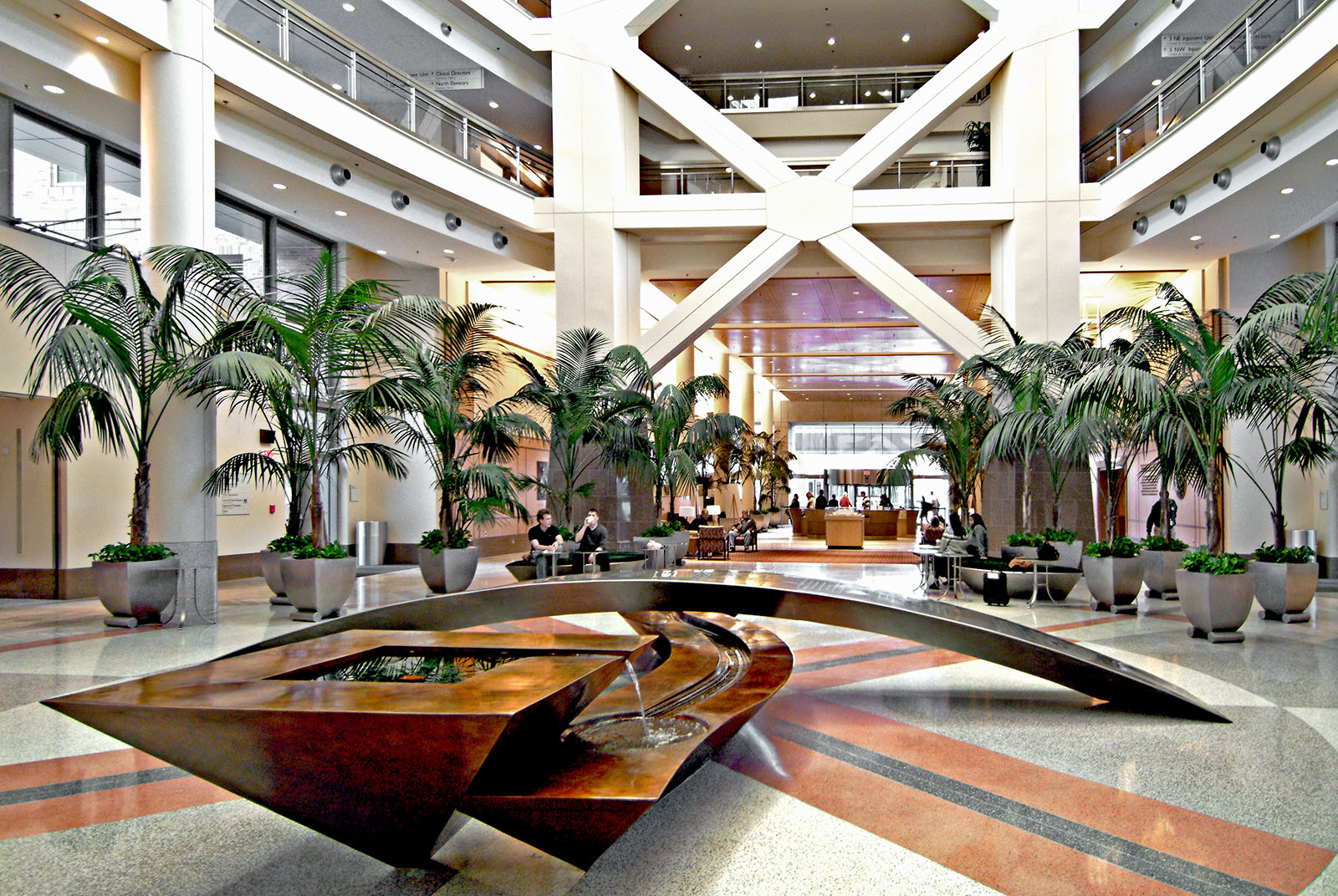
Looking at the Main Lobby at the Clinical Research Center at NIH

The Bayview Campus in Baltimore, Maryland houses the research programs of the National Institute on Aging, National Institute on Drug Abuse, and National Human Genome Research Institute with nearly 1,000 scientists and support staff. The Frederick National Laboratory in Frederick, MD and the nearby Riverside Research Park, houses many components of the National Cancer Institute, including the Center for Cancer Research, Office of Scientific Operations, Management Operations Support Branch, the division of Cancer Epidemiology and Genetics and the division of Cancer Treatment and Diagnosis.

The National Institute of Environmental Health Sciences is located in the Research Triangle region of North Carolina.

Other ICs have satellite locations in addition to operations at the main campus. The National Institute of Allergy and Infectious Diseases maintains its Rocky Mountain Labs in Hamilton, Montana, with an emphasis on BSL3 and BSL4 laboratory work. NIDDK operates the Phoenix Epidemiology and Clinical Research Branch in Phoenix, Arizona.

== Research ==
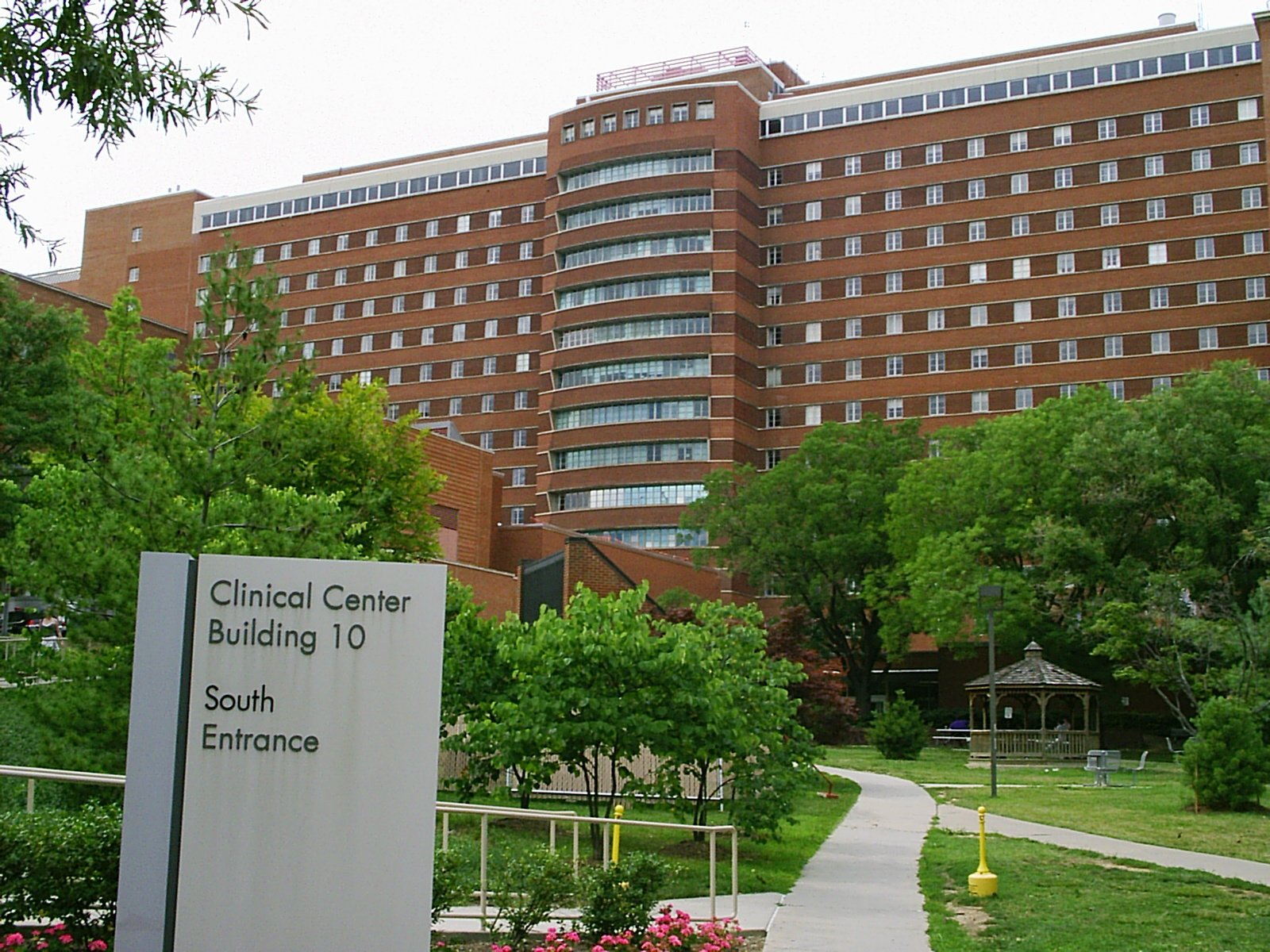
Clinical Center – Building 10

As of 2017, 153 scientists receiving financial support from the NIH have been awarded a Nobel Prize and 195 have been awarded a Lasker Award.

=== Intramural and extramural research ===
In 2019, the NIH devoted 10% of its funding to research within its own facilities (intramural research), and gave >80% of its funding in research grants to extramural (outside) researchers. Of this extramural funding, a certain percentage (2.8% in 2014) must be granted to small businesses under the SBIR/STTR program. As of 2011, the extramural funding consisted of about 50,000 grants to more than 325,000 researchers at more than 3000 institutions. By 2018, this rate of granting remained reasonably steady, at 47,000 grants to 2,700 organizations. In FY 2010, the NIH spent US$10.7bn (not including temporary funding from the American Recovery and Reinvestment Act of 2009) on clinical research, US$7.4bn on genetics-related research, US$6.0bn on prevention research, US$5.8bn on cancer, and US$5.7bn on biotechnology.

=== Public Access Policy ===
In 2008 a Congressional mandate called for investigators funded by the NIH to submit an electronic version of their final manuscripts to the National Library of Medicine's research repository, PubMed Central (PMC), no later than 12 months after the official date of publication. The NIH Public Access Policy was the first public access mandate for a U.S. public funding agency.

=== Economic return ===
In 2000, the Joint Economic Committee of Congress reported NIH research, which was funded at $16 billion a year in 2000, that some econometric studies had given a rate of return of 25 to 40 percent per year by reducing the economic cost of illness in the US. It found that of the 21 drugs with the highest therapeutic impact on society introduced between 1965 and 1992, public funding was "instrumental" for 15. As of 2011, NIH-supported research helped to discover 153 new FDA-approved drugs, vaccines, and new indications for drugs in the 40 years prior. One study found NIH funding aided either directly or indirectly in developing the drugs or drug targets for all of the 210 FDA-approved drugs from 2010 to 2016. In 2015, Pierre Azoulay et al. estimated $10 million invested in research generated two to three new patents.

=== Notable discoveries and developments ===
Since its inception, the NIH intramural research program has been a source of many pivotal scientific and medical discoveries. Some of these include:

- 1908: George W. McCoy's discovery that rodents were a reservoir of bubonic plague.
- 1911: George W. McCoy, Charles W. Chapin, William B. Wherry, and B. H. Lamb described the previously unknown tularemia.
- 1924: Roscoe R. Spencer and Ralph R. Parker developed a vaccine against Rocky Mountain spotted fever.
- 1930: Sanford M. Rosenthal developed a treatment for mercury poisoning used widely before the development of dimercaptoethanol.
- 1943: Wilton R. Earle pioneered the cell culture process and published a paper describing the production of malignancy in vitro, Katherine K. Sanford developed the first clone from an isolated cancer cell, and Virginia J. Evans devised a medium that supported growth of cells in vitro.
- 1940s–1950s: Bernard Horecker and colleagues described the pentose phosphate pathway.
- 1950s: Julius Axelrod discovered a new class of enzymes, cytochrome P450 monooxygenases, a fundamental of drug metabolism.
- 1950: Earl Stadtman discovered phosphotransacetylose, elucidating the role of acetyl CoA in fatty acid metabolism.
- 1960s: Discovered the first human slow virus disease, kuru, which is a degenerative, fatal infection of the central nervous system. This discovery of a new mechanism for infectious diseases revolutionized thinking in microbiology and neurology.
- 1960s: Defined the mechanisms that regulate noradrenaline, one of the most important neurotransmitters in the brain.
- 1960s: Developed the first licensed rubella vaccine and the first test for rubella antibodies for large scale testing.
- 1960s: Developed an effective combination drug regimen for Hodgkin's lymphoma.
- 1960s: Discovery that tooth decay is caused by bacteria.
- 1970s: Developed the assay for human chorionic gonadotropin that evolved into the home pregnancy tests.
- 1970s: Described the hormonal cycle involved in menstruation.
- 1980s: Determined the complete structure of the IgE receptor that is involved in allergic reactions.
- 1990s: Hari Reddi's identification and purification of bone morphogenetic proteins
- 1990s: First trial of gene therapy in humans.

==== NIH Toolbox ====
In September 2006, the NIH Blueprint for Neuroscience Research started a contract for the NIH Toolbox for the Assessment of Neurological and Behavioral Function to develop a set of state-of-the-art measurement tools to enhance collection of data in large cohort studies. More than 250 scientists from almost 100 academic institutions contributed to its development. In September 2012, the NIH Toolbox was rolled out to the research community. NIH Toolbox assessments are based, where possible, on Item Response Theory and adapted for testing by computer.

==== Database of Genotypes and Phenotypes ====
NIH sponsors the Database of Genotypes and Phenotypes (dbGaP), a repository of information produced by studies investigating the interaction of genotype and phenotype. The information includes phenotypes, molecular assay data, analyses and documents. Summary-level data is available to the general public whereas the individual-level data is accessible to researchers. According to the City Journal NIH denies access to such attributes as intelligence, education and health on the grounds that studying their genetic basis would be stigmatizing.

==== Coronavirus vaccine ====
The NIH partnered with Moderna in 2020 during the COVID-19 pandemic to develop a vaccine. The final phase of testing began on July 27 with up to 30,000 volunteers assigned to one of two groups—one receiving the mRNA-1273 vaccine and the other receiving salt water injections—and continued until there had been approximately 100 cases of COVID-19 among the participants. In 2021, the NIH contributed $4,395,399 towards the Accelerating COVID-19 Therapeutic Interventions and Vaccines (ACTIV) program.

==== Grant to EcoHealth Alliance and Wuhan Institute for studying bat coronaviruses ====
Following the outbreak of the COVID-19 pandemic, the NIH-funded EcoHealth Alliance has been the subject of controversy and increased scrutiny due to its ties to the Wuhan Institute of Virology (WIV)—which has been at the center of speculation since early 2020 that SARS-CoV-2 may have escaped in a lab incident. Between 2014 and 2019, NIH awarded approximately $3.7 million in grant funding to EcoHealth Alliance, a nonprofit organization focused on global health and infectious disease research. A portion of this funding, around $600,000, was subcontracted to WIV in China as part of a project titled "Understanding the Risk of Bat Coronavirus Emergence." The project aimed to study bat coronaviruses and assess their potential to infect humans. The research at WIV included the creation of chimeric viruses, which combined genetic material from different bat coronaviruses to evaluate their ability to infect human cells. In documents released in 2021, including NIH correspondence with Congress, it was disclosed that one of these modified viruses resulted in an "unexpected outcome," where the virus became more infectious in humanized mice. The NIH maintained that this outcome was not the intended goal of the research and did not violate the terms of the grant, though critics raised concerns about potential gain-of-function research. Under political pressure, the NIH withdrew funding to EcoHealth Alliance in July 2020. In 2023, HHS barred WIV from receiving U.S. government funding for a decade, citing non-compliance with safety and reporting standards.

==== NIH Interagency Pain Research Coordinating Committee ====
On February 13, 2012, the National Institutes of Health (NIH) announced a new group of individuals assigned to research pain. This committee is composed of researchers from different organizations and will focus to "coordinate pain research activities across the federal government with the goals of stimulating pain research collaboration… and providing an important avenue for public involvement" ("Members of new", 2012). With a committee such as this research will not be conducted by each individual organization or person but instead a collaborating group which will increase the information available. With this hopefully more pain management will be available including techniques for those with arthritis. In 2020 Beth Darnall, American scientist and pain psychologist, was appointed as scientific member of the group.

== Funding ==
=== Budget and politics ===
Historical NIH budget
Year	$ millions
1938	0.5
1940	0.7
1945	2.8
1950	52.7
1955	81.2
1960	399.4
1965	959.2
1970	1,061.0
1975	2,092.9
1980	3,428.9
1985	5,149.5
1990	7,567.4
1995	11,299.5
2000	17,840.5
2005	28,594.4
2010	31,238.0
2015	30,311.4
2016	32,311.4
2017	34,300.9
2018	37,311.3
2019	39,311.3
2020	41,690.0
2021	42,940.5
2022	45,183.0
2023	47,683.5
2024	48,856.5

To allocate funds, the NIH must first obtain its budget from Congress. This process begins with institute and center (IC) leaders collaborating with scientists to determine the most important and promising research areas within their fields. IC leaders discuss research areas with NIH management who then develops a budget request for continuing projects, new research proposals, and new initiatives from the Director. The NIH submits its budget request to the Department of Health and Human Services (HHS), and the HHS considers this request as a portion of its budget. Many adjustments and appeals occur between the NIH and HHS before the agency submits NIH's budget request to the Office of Management and Budget (OMB). OMB determines what amounts and research areas are approved for incorporation into the President's final budget. The President then sends the NIH's budget request to Congress in February for the next fiscal year's allocations. The House and Senate Appropriations Subcommittees deliberate and by fall, Congress usually appropriates funding. This process takes approximately 18 months before the NIH can allocate any actual funds.

When a government shutdown occurs, the NIH continues to treat people who are already enrolled in clinical trials, but does not start any new clinical trials and does not admit new patients who are not already enrolled in a clinical trial, except for the most critically ill, as determined by the NIH Director.

==== Historical funding ====
Over the last century, the responsibility to allocate funding has shifted from the OD and Advisory Committee to the individual ICs and Congress increasingly set apart funding for particular causes. In the 1970s, Congress began to earmark funds specifically for cancer research, and in the 1980s there was a significant amount allocated for AIDS/HIV research.

Funding for the NIH has often been a source of contention in Congress, serving as a proxy for the political currents of the time. During the 1980s, President Reagan repeatedly tried to cut funding for research, only to see Congress partly restore funding. The political contention over NIH funding slowed the nation's response to the AIDS epidemic; while AIDS was reported in newspaper articles from 1981, no funding was provided for research on the disease. In 1984 National Cancer Institute scientists found implications that "variants of a human cancer virus called HTLV-III are the primary cause of acquired immunodeficiency syndrome (AIDS)," a new epidemic that gripped the nation.

In 1992, the NIH encompassed nearly 1 percent of the federal government's operating budget and controlled more than 50 percent of all funding for health research and 85 percent of all funding for health studies in universities. From 1993 to 2001 the NIH budget doubled. For a time, funding essentially remained flat, and for seven years after the 2008 financial crisis, the NIH budget struggled to keep up with inflation.

In 1999 Congress increased the NIH's budget by $2.3 billion to $17.2 billion in 2000. In 2009 Congress again increased the NIH budget to $31 billion in 2010. In 2017 and 2018, Congress passed laws with bipartisan support that substantially increasing appropriations for the NIH, which was 37.3 billion dollars annually in FY2018.

===== Funding freezes =====
From the outset of 2025, NIH funding operations have faced interruptions on an unprecedented scale under the direction of the current executive branch of the U.S. government; disruptions as of March 2025 include the following:

• impeding grants for dementia and ALS research;

• hindering procurement of necessary resources, such as those for transporting patient blood samples;

• preventing a research scientist from consulting with physicians treating children with a devastating rare condition;

• interrupting the supply of mice for genetic studies, with years of research being imperiled as a result;

• cutting research grants for training doctoral and postdoctoral students.

This has led to protests such as the Bethesda Declaration, an open letter from former and current NIH staffers.

=== Extramural research ===
Researchers at universities or other institutions outside of the NIH can apply for research project grants (RPGs) from the NIH. There are numerous funding mechanisms for different project types (e.g., basic research, clinical research, etc.) and career stages (e.g., early career, postdoc fellowships, etc.). The NIH regularly issues "requests for applications" (RFAs), e.g., on specific programmatic priorities or timely medical problems (such as Zika virus research in early 2016). In addition, researchers can apply for "investigator-initiated grants" whose subject is determined by the scientist.

The total number of applicants has increased substantially, from about 60,000 investigators who had applied during the period from 1999 to 2003 to slightly less than 90,000 in who had applied during the period from 2011 to 2015. Due to this, the "cumulative investigator rate", that is, the likelihood that unique investigators are funded over a 5-year window, has declined from 43% to 31%.

R01 grants are the most common funding mechanism and include investigator-initiated projects. The roughly 27,000 to 29,000 R01 applications had a funding success of 17-19% during 2012 though 2014. Similarly, the 13,000 to 14,000 R21 applications had a funding success of 13-14% during the same period. In FY 2016, the total number of grant applications received by the NIH was 54,220, with approximately 19% being awarded funding. Institutes have varying funding rates. The National Cancer Institute awarded funding to 12% of applicants, while the National Institute for General Medical Science awarded funding to 30% of applicants.

=== Funding criteria ===
The NIH employs five broad decision criteria in its funding policy. First, ensure the highest quality of scientific research by employing an arduous peer review process. Second, seize opportunities that have the greatest potential to yield new knowledge and that will lead to better prevention and treatment of disease. Third, maintain a diverse research portfolio to capitalize on major discoveries in a variety of fields such as cell biology, genetics, physics, engineering, and computer science. Fourth, address public health needs according to the disease burden (e.g., prevalence and mortality). And fifth, construct and support the scientific infrastructure (e.g., well-equipped laboratories and safe research facilities) necessary to conduct research.

Advisory committee members advise the institute on policy and procedures affecting the external research programs and provide a second level of review for all grant and cooperative agreement applications considered by the Institute for funding.

==== Gender and sex bias ====
In 2014, it was announced that the NIH is directing scientists to perform their experiments with both female and male animals, or cells derived from females as well as males if they are studying cell cultures, and that the NIH would take the balance of each study design into consideration when awarding grants. The announcement also stated that this rule would probably not apply when studying sex-specific diseases (for example, ovarian or testicular cancer).

=== Stakeholders ===
==== General public ====
One of the goals of the NIH is to "expand the base in medical and associated sciences in order to ensure a continued high return on the public investment in research." Taxpayer dollars funding the NIH are from the taxpayers, making them the primary beneficiaries of advances in research. Thus, the general public is a key stakeholder in the decisions resulting from the NIH funding policy. However, some in the general public do not feel their interests are being represented, and individuals have formed patient advocacy groups to represent their own interests.

==== Extramural researchers and scientists ====
Important stakeholders of the NIH funding policy include researchers and scientists. Extramural researchers differ from intramural researchers in that they are not employed by the NIH but may apply for funding. Throughout the history of the NIH, the amount of funding received has increased, but the proportion to each IC remains relatively constant. The individual ICs then decide who will receive the grant money and how much will be allotted.

Policy changes on who receives funding significantly affect researchers. For example, the NIH has recently attempted to approve more first-time NIH R01 applicants or the research grant applications of young scientists. To encourage the participation of young scientists, the application process has been shortened and made easier. In addition, first-time applicants are being offered more funding for their research grants than those who have received grants in the past.

== Commercial partnerships ==
In 2011 and 2012, the Department of Health and Human Services Office of Inspector General published a series of audit reports revealing that throughout the fiscal years 2000–2010, institutes under the aegis of the NIH did not comply with the time and amount requirements specified in appropriations statutes, in awarding federal contracts to commercial partners, committing the federal government to tens of millions of dollars of expenditure ahead of appropriation of funds from Congress.

== Institutes and centers ==
The NIH is composed of 27 separate institutes and centers that conduct and coordinate biomedical research. These are:

- National Cancer Institute (NCI)
- National Eye Institute (NEI)
- National Heart, Lung, and Blood Institute (NHLBI)
- National Human Genome Research Institute (NHGRI)
- National Institute on Aging (NIA)
- National Institute on Alcohol Abuse and Alcoholism (NIAAA)
- National Institute of Allergy and Infectious Diseases (NIAID)
- National Institute of Arthritis and Musculoskeletal and Skin Diseases (NIAMS)
- National Institute of Biomedical Imaging and Bioengineering (NIBIB)
- National Institute of Child Health and Human Development (NICHD)
- National Institute on Deafness and Other Communication Disorders (NIDCD)
- National Institute of Dental and Craniofacial Research (NIDCR)
- National Institute of Diabetes and Digestive and Kidney Diseases (NIDDK)
- National Institute on Drug Abuse (NIDA)
- National Institute of Environmental Health Sciences (NIEHS)
- National Institute of General Medical Sciences (NIGMS)
- National Institute of Mental Health (NIMH)
- National Institute on Minority Health and Health Disparities (NIMHD)
- National Institute of Neurological Disorders and Stroke (NINDS)
- National Institute of Nursing Research (NINR)
- National Library of Medicine (NLM)
- Center for Information Technology (CIT)
- Center for Scientific Review (CSR)
- Fogarty International Center (FIC)
- National Center for Advancing Translational Sciences (NCATS)
- National Center for Complementary and Integrative Health (NCCIH)
- NIH Clinical Center (NIH CC)

In addition, the National Center for Research Resources operated from April 13, 1962, to December 23, 2011.

== ARPA-H ==
The Advanced Research Projects Agency for Health (ARPA-H) is an entity formerly within the Office of the United States Secretary of Health and Human Services, which was created by Congress in the Consolidated Appropriations Act, 2022. Modeled after DARPA, HSARPA, IARPA, and ARPA-E, it is intended to pursue unconventional research projects through methods not typically used by federal agencies or private sector companies. Secretary Xavier Becerra delegated ARPA-H to the NIH on May 24, 2022. It received $1 billion in appropriations in 2022, and $1.5 billion in 2023, and as of June 2023 it is requesting $2.5 billion for 2024.

== Consensus Development Program ==
The Consensus Development Program is an initiative focused on gathering expert opinions to establish standards and guidelines in various fields, especially in health and medicine. Developed as a collaborative effort by organizations such as the NIH, the program assembles panels of specialists who assess available evidence on critical topics and form recommendations to guide clinical practice and policy. This method helps ensure that healthcare decisions are informed by the latest scientific research and expert consensus.

== See also ==
- Biomedical Engineering and Instrumentation Program (BEIP)
- Foundation for the National Institutes of Health
- Heads of International Research Organizations
- List of institutes and centers of the National Institutes of Health
- National Institute of Food and Agriculture
- National Institutes of Health Stroke Scale
- National Science Foundation
- NIH Toolbox
- United States Public Health Service
