= Winkler (surname) =

Winkler is a surname. Notable people with the surname include:

== Artists and entertainers ==
- Austin John Winkler (born 1981), American singer-songwriter, former lead singer for Hinder
- John E. Winkler (1941–2007), American author and photographer
- Ralf Winkler (1939-2017), also known as A. R. Penck, German painter
- Vladimir Winkler (1884–1956), Czech and Russian sculptor

=== Actors ===
- Angela Winkler (born 1944), German actress
- Henry Winkler (born 1945), American actor
- Jenny Winkler (born 1979), German actress
- Margo Winkler (born 1930s), American actress
- Mel Winkler (1941–2020), American actor
- Wolfgang Winkler (actor)

=== Filmmakers ===
- Ben Winkler (1902–1979), American sound engineer
- Charles Winkler, American film director
- Irwin Winkler (born 1931), American film producer and director
- Johannes Winkler (composer), German film composer, multi-instrumentalist and music producer
- Margaret J. Winkler (1895–1990), American film producer
- Paul Winkler (director) (born 1939), German film director active in Australia

== Athletes ==
- Alberto Winkler (1932–1981) Italian rower and Olympian
- Dan Winkler (born 1990), American baseball player
- Hans Günter Winkler (1926-2018), German show jumping rider
- Jack Winkler (born 1998), American baseball player
- Konrad Winkler (fencer) (1882–1962), Polish fencer
- Rudy Winkler (born 1994), American Olympic track and field athlete
- Scott Winkler, American Paralympic track and field athlete

=== Footballers ===
- Bernhard Winkler (born 1966), German footballer
- Jim Winkler (American football) (1927–2001), American footballer
- Joe Winkler (1922–2001), American football player
- Paul Winkler (footballer) (1913–1996), German soccer player
- Randy Winkler (born 1943), American football player

=== Winter sportsmen ===
- Hans-Heinrich Winkler, East German luger
- Harald Winkler (born 1962), Austrian bobsledder
- Kati Winkler (born 1974), German figure skater
- Konrad Winkler (skier) (born 1955), East German Nordic combined skier
- Ronny Winkler (born 1971), German figure skater
- Sieglinde Winkler (born 1966), Austrian alpine skier
- Wolfgang Winkler (luger) (1940-2001), German luger

== Other ==
- Alexander Winkler (disambiguation), multiple people
- Gerhard Winkler (disambiguation), multiple people
- Gus Winkler (1901-1933), American gangster and associate of Al Capone
- Gustav Winkler (1867–1954), German industrialist
- Harry Winkler (disambiguation), multiple people
- Jim Winkler, leading member of the United Methodist Church
- John Winkler (disambiguation)
- Josef Winkler (disambiguation), multiple people
- Mary Winkler (born 1973), American murderer
- Matthew Winkler (disambiguation), multiple people
- Paul Winkler (disambiguation)
- Todd Winkler, (born 1967), American murderer

== Politicians ==
- Clinton McKamy Winkler (1821–1882), American politician and Confederate soldier, namesake of Winkler County, Texas
- Eric Winkler (1920–1995), Canadian politician
- Hermann Winkler (born 1963), German politician and Member of the European Parliament
- Lenny Winkler, American politician
- Max Winkler (1875–1961), German Reich Trustee and Reich Commissioner for German Cinema
- Mike Winkler, American politician
- Myra Carroll Winkler (1880-1963), American educator and politician
- Tobias Winkler (born 1978), German politician

== Scientists ==
- Johannes Winkler (1897–1947), German rocket pioneer
- Peter Winkler, American mathematician
- Wilhelm Winkler (1884-1984), Bohemian and Austrian statistician

=== Life scientists ===
- Albert J. Winkler (1894–1989), American professor of viticulture
- Hans Winkler (1877–1945), German botanist
- Helmut Gustav Franz Winkler (1915–1980), German geologist
- Hubert Winkler (1875–1941), German botanist
- Malcolm Winkler, American biologist

=== Physical scientists ===
- Clemens Winkler (1838–1904), German chemist, discoverer of germanium
- Emil Winkler (1835–1888), German engineer
- Frank Winkler, American astronomer
- Gernot M. R. Winkler (1922-2016), time measurement specialist at USNO
- Lajos Winkler (1863–1939), Hungarian chemist, a.k.a. Ludwig Wilhelm Winkler, who developed Winkler titration
- Rita Winkler, Canadian hydrologist
- Tiberius Cornelis Winkler (1822–1897), Dutch anatomist and paleontologist

== Writers and academics ==
- Angelina Virginia Winkler (1842–1911), American journalist, editor, magazine publisher
- Anthony Winkler Prins (1817-1908), Dutch writer and encyclopedist
- Eugen Gottlob Winkler (1912–1936), German essayist
- Heinrich August Winkler (born 1938), German historian
- John J. Winkler (1943-1990), American philologist and Benedictine monk
- Jonathan Reed Winkler (born 1975), American historian
- Kenneth Winkler (born 1950), American philosopher
- Paul Winkler (publisher) (1898–1982), Jewish-Hungarian journalist, writer, publisher active in France

== See also ==
- Potato Germans
- Winckler
