= Post-traumatic amnesia =

- Specialty: Psychiatry, neurology, neuropsychology

Post-traumatic amnesia (PTA) is a state of confusion that occurs immediately following a traumatic brain injury (TBI) in which the injured person is disoriented and unable to remember events that occur after the injury. The person may be unable to state their name, where they are, and what time it is. When continuous memory returns, PTA is considered to have resolved. While PTA lasts, new events cannot be stored in the memory. About a third of patients with mild head injury are reported to have "islands of memory", in which the patient can recall only some events. During PTA, the patient's consciousness is "clouded". Because PTA involves confusion in addition to the memory loss typical of amnesia, the term "post-traumatic confusional state" has been proposed as an alternative.

There are two types of amnesia: retrograde amnesia (loss of memories that were formed shortly before the injury) and anterograde amnesia (problems with creating new memories after the injury has taken place). PTA may refer to only anterograde forms, or to both retrograde and anterograde forms.

A common example in sports concussion is the quarterback who was able to conduct the complicated mental tasks of leading a football team after a concussion, but has no recollection the next day of the part of the game that took place after the injury. Individuals with retrograde amnesia may partially regain memory later, but memories are not regained with anterograde amnesia because they were not encoded properly.

The term "post-traumatic amnesia" was first used in 1940 in a paper by Symonds to refer to the period between the injury and the return of full, continuous memory, including any time during which the patient was unconscious.

== Symptoms ==
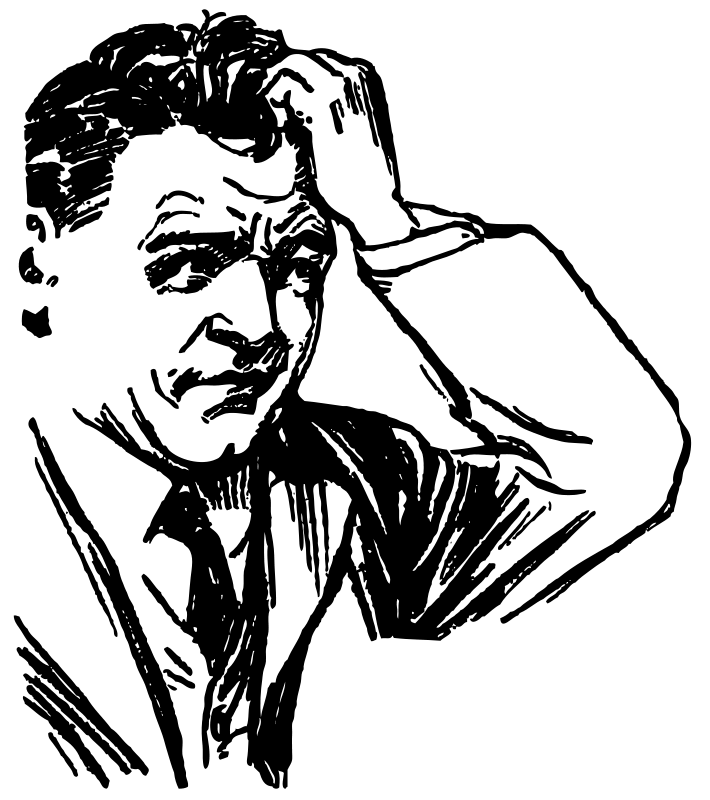
A common symptom of PTA is confusion.

The most prominent symptom of post-traumatic amnesia (PTA) is a loss of memory of the present time. As a result, patients are often unaware of their condition and may behave as if they are going about their regular lives. This can cause complications if patients are confined to a hospital and may lead to agitation, distress and anxiety. Many patients report feeling as though they were being "held prisoner" and being prevented from carrying on with their daily lives. Other symptoms include agitation, confusion, disorientation, and restlessness.

Patients also often display behavioral disturbances. Patients may shout, swear and behave in a disinhibited fashion. There have been cases in which patients who do not recognize anyone will ask for family members or acquaintances that they have not seen in years. Some patients exhibit childlike behavior. Other patients show uncharacteristically quiet, friendly and loving behavior. Although this behavior may seem less threatening because of its lack of aggressiveness, it may be equally worrisome.

PTA patients are often unaware of their surroundings and will ask questions repeatedly. Patients may also have a tendency to wander off, which can be a major concern in those who have sustained additional injuries at the time of trauma, such as injured limbs, as it may lead to the worsening of these secondary injuries.

=== Attention ===
Attention is a cognitive resource that contributes to many mental functions. The ability to engage attention requires a certain level of conscious awareness, arousal and concentration, all mechanisms that are generally impaired by traumatic brain injury. The involvement of attention in such a vast array of cognitive processes has led to the suggestion that attentional deficit may act as an underlying factor in the range of cognitive deficits observed in patients experiencing post-traumatic amnesia (PTA).

Attention has been regarded as an important factor in the healthy functioning of encoding, verbal comprehension and new learning. Automatic attention processes (such as counting forwards) are recovered before simple memory skills (such as a recognition test of verbal material) in individuals with mild to moderate brain injury. This implies that the recovery of attentional ability precedes the progression of memory recovery after injury, helping to pave the way to regain ability for new learning. In terms of more severe brain injuries, this automatic attention task performance recovers before disorientation completely resolves.

One of the weaknesses of the method most often used in assessing PTA, the Galveston Orientation and Amnesia Test (GOAT), is that it does not include any assessment of attention, which could help give a better indication of potential for recovery. By omitting attention, the test is omitting some crucial aspects of a person's cognitive capabilities.

In addition, assessing attention during the period of PTA may help determine whether the patient is still in a state of PTA or if they are experiencing a more permanent form of memory deficit. In patients with mild TBI, the damage consists primarily of diffuse axonal injury (widespread damage to white matter) without any focal damage (damage to specific areas). Sometimes, injury of the brainstem was also observed. In these cases, there is likely the presence of an attentional deficit without a true amnesiac state. In more severely brain-damaged individuals, the damage to the temporal lobes and the frontal lobes serves as good indication that amnesia will result. Patients with more chronic forms of memory impairment showed poor performance when tested with PTA scales, making differentiation between the two types of memory impairment very difficult. PTA patients exhibit poor simple reaction time, reduced information processing speed and reduced verbal fluency, which are all attentional deficits that could be used to distinguish these patients from those with more severe and permanent memory problems.

=== Communication skills ===
The effects of PTA on communication skills were studied using the Revised Edinburgh Functional Communication Profile (REFCP), which measures both linguistic elements (related to speech) and pragmatic elements (related to body language and other non-verbal communication skills). PTA has effects on memory, perception and attention, which are all important for communication. Patients showed mild deficits in verbal communication skills, and moderate to severe deficits in nonverbal communication skills such as maintaining eye contact, initiating greetings, and responding appropriately. Also, a negative correlation was found between the duration of a patient's episode of PTA and his REFCP score; the longer the PTA episode, the more severe the deficit in non-linguistic pragmatic skills. However, the small sample size of this study (only 10 males) means that the results must be interpreted with caution, as they may not generalize to larger samples or to the population at large.

== Pathophysiology ==
Currently, the pathophysiological mechanisms which produce post-traumatic amnesia are not completely known. The most common research strategy to clarify these mechanisms is the examination of the impaired functional capabilities of people with post-traumatic amnesia (PTA) after a traumatic brain injury.

=== Neurological mechanisms ===
Hippocampus (animation)

Research on the effect of emotional trauma on memory retention and amnesic symptoms has shown that exposure to prolonged levels of extreme stress has a direct effect on the hippocampus. Elevated stress levels can lead to an increase in the production of enkephalins and corticosteroids, which can produce abnormal neural activity and disrupt long-term potentiation (a neural mechanism associated with learning) in the hippocampus. Individuals who have been subjected to repeated sexual abuse during childhood or who have experienced combat show significant impairment and atrophy of the hippocampal region of the brain. The amygdala, an area of the brain involved in emotional regulation, may be involved in producing remembrance for some aspects of the trauma. Even though the trace of a memory for trauma may be lost from the hippocampus, it may remain partially encoded in the form of an emotional memory in the amygdala where it can be subsequently recalled in the form of a flashback or partially recovered memory.

=== Diaschisis ===
Diaschisis refers to the sudden dysfunction of portions of the brain due to lesions in distant but connected neurons. Diaschisis is implicated as playing an important role in PTA, more particularly in the declarative memory impairments observed in patients experiencing an episode of PTA. The loss of function observed after traumatic brain injuries, as well as the resulting loss of consciousness, was thought to be mediated by the 'neural shock' associated with diaschisis.

Diaschisis was originally believed to be a result of disruption to neural tissue, but more recent evidence implicates increased activity levels of choline acetyltransferase, the enzyme responsible for the production of acetylcholine, as a major cause. Based on these findings, diaschisis could be helped through the use of drugs that would reduce cholinergic (acetylcholine) activity, and reduce the levels of acetylcholine in the brain. This idea is supported by the fact that there is an increase in acetylcholine concentrations in the brain after head injury. Animal studies have shown that concussive injuries in rats lead to changes in the central nervous system's cholinergic system. This increase in acetylcholine levels has also been tied to behavioral suppression and unconsciousness, both symptoms of PTA. In long-term recovery, acetylcholine levels associated with diaschisis may continue to play a role in maintaining memory deficits.

=== Brain-imaging studies ===
Brain imaging techniques are useful for examining the changes in the brain that occur as a result of damage. Metting et al. (2001) used CT scans to examine the pathophyiological damage in patients currently experiencing an episode of PTA, patients with resolved PTA, and a control group that had not experienced PTA. Bloodflow to the occipital lobe, the caudate nucleus, and the grey matter of the frontal lobe was significantly reduced in patients who were scanned during the episode of PTA. No differences were seen between patients with resolved PTA and the control group. This encouraging finding points to the positive long term prognosis of PTA; most patients return to normal levels of functioning. The frontal lobes are associated with explicit memory retrieval, and deficits on explicit memory tasks are often found with patients experiencing PTA.

Working memory deficits are a common symptom in patients with PTA. The duration of an episode of PTA was correlated with reduced bloodflow to the right hemisphere, a finding which was consistent with functional MRI studies that link working memory with right frontal activity. The prefrontal cortex, which plays an important role in explicit memory retrieval, was also found to have decreased neural activation in patients scanned during the episode of PTA. Researchers noted that the damage was related to vascularization and neural functionality, but not to structural injury, suggesting that the resolution of PTA is dependent on functional changes.

Memory and new learning involve the cerebral cortex, the subcortical projections, the hippocampus, the diencephalon and the thalamus, areas that often experience damage as a result of TBI. Frontal lobe lesions may also play a role in PTA, as damage to these areas is associated with changes in behavior, including irritability, aggressiveness, disinhibition, and a loss of judgment. Damage to this area may account for the uncharacteristic behavior often exhibited in PTA patients.

==== Accelerated forgetting ====
Researchers have also found that individuals experiencing PTA show accelerated forgetting. This contrasts with the normal forgetting observed by patients with normal amnesia related to brain damage. The temporal lobes are often the most vulnerable to the diffuse (widely distributed) and focal (more specifically localized) effects of TBI and it is possible that temporal lobe lesions may account for the accelerated forgetting observed in patients with PTA. These predictions were supported by the finding that most of the patients who showed rapid forgetting also had lesions to the temporal lobe. Bilateral damage to the temporal lobes also causes severe anterograde amnesia, making it likely that lesions to this area would be involved in PTA. Patients exhibit a temporal gradient with memory loss, meaning that older memories are preserved at the expense of newer memories. Temporal lobe damage has been linked to a temporal gradient of this sort, because older memories are less dependent on the hippocampus and thus are less influenced by its damage.

There is a significant link between individuals currently experiencing PTA and their performance on the Wechsler Adult Intelligence Scale (WAIS). The scores of those currently experiencing an episode of PTA were compared to individuals who had previously had a traumatic brain injury resulting in PTA. Those still experiencing PTA performed significantly worse on both the performance and the verbal subscales of the WAIS. Also, people in early stages of PTA have substantial impairment to anterograde memory function. For example, in the case report of a patient referred to as "JL", Demery et al. noted that his memory impairments were so severe following his injury that he had forgotten that he had attended a Major League Baseball game less than 30 minutes after returning to the center where he was being treated.

The majority of neuropsychological studies available have suggested that the medial temporal lobes are the most important system in the pathophysiology of PTA. However, there is little research done on this topic, and as new research is done, more information should come forth concerning functionality in these areas in PTA patients. One MRI study showed that a long duration of PTA was correlated with damage in the hemispheric and central areas, regardless of whether the duration of the coma was relatively short. In patients who had a longer coma duration, deeper lesions in the central area were observed without extensive damage to the hemispheric area.

== Diagnosis ==
=== Measure of traumatic brain injury severity ===
Levels of TBI severity
	GCS	PTA	LOC
Mild	13–15	< 1 hour	< 30 minutes
Moderate	9–12	30 minutes– 24 hours	1–24 hours
Severe	3–8	> 1 day	> 24 hours

TBI severity using PTA alone
Severity	PTA
Very mild	< 5 minutes
Mild	5–60 minutes
Moderate	1–24 hours
Severe	1–7 days
Very severe	1–4 weeks
Extremely severe	> 4 weeks

PTA has been proposed to be the best measure of head trauma severity, but it may not be a reliable indicator of outcome. However, PTA duration may be linked to the likelihood that psychiatric and behavioral problems will occur as consequences of TBI.

Classification systems for determining the severity of TBI may use duration of PTA alone or with other factors such as Glasgow Coma Scale (GCS) score and duration of loss of consciousness (LOC) to divide TBI into categories of mild, moderate, and severe. One common system using all three factors and one using PTA alone are shown in the tables at right. Duration of PTA usually correlates well with GCS and usually lasts about four times longer than unconsciousness.

PTA is considered a hallmark of concussion, and is used as a measure of predicting its severity, for example in concussion grading scales. It may be more reliable for determining severity of concussion than GCS because the latter may not be sensitive enough; individuals with s concussion often quickly regain a GCS score of 15.

Longer periods of amnesia or loss of consciousness immediately after the injury may indicate longer recovery times from residual symptoms from concussion. Increased duration of PTA is associated with a heightened risk for TBI complications such as post-traumatic epilepsy.

=== Assessment ===
Duration of PTA may be difficult to gauge accurately; it may be overestimated (for example, if the patient is asleep or under the influence of drugs or alcohol for part of the time) or underestimated (for example, if some memories come back before continuous memory is regained). The Galveston Orientation and Amnesia Test (GOAT) exists to determine how oriented a patient is and how much material they are able to recall. The GOAT is the most widely used standardized scale for the prospective assessment of PTA in the United States and Canada. The test is made up of 10 items that assess orientation and recollection of the events before and after the injury. It can be used to assess the duration of PTA; this particular GOAT assessment has been found to strongly predict functional outcome as measured by the Glasgow Outcome Scale, return to productivity, psychosocial function and distress.

An alternative to the GOAT is the Westmead Post-Traumatic Amnesia Scale (WPTAS) which examines not only orientation to person, place and time, but also crucially the ability to consistently remember new information from one day to the next. It consists of twelve questions (seven orientation questions, and five memory items) and is administered once daily, each and every day, until the patient scores a perfect score of 12/12 on three consecutive days. It is suitable for patients with moderate to severe traumatic brain injury. The WPTAS is the most common post-traumatic amnesia scale used in Australia and New Zealand. An abbreviated version has been developed to assess patients with mild traumatic brain injury, the Abbreviated Westmead PTA Scale (AWPTAS).

=== Testing ===
Before the development of the current tests for the assessment of post-traumatic amnesia (PTA), a retrospective method was used to determine the patient's condition, consisting of one or more interviews with the patient after the episode of PTA was judged to be over. The retrospective method, however, fails to account for the apparent lucidity of patients who are still experiencing substantial disorientation, or the finding that the recovery from post-traumatic amnesia is often characterized by the presence of "islands of memory" (short periods of clarity). A failure to take these facts into consideration may have biased retrospective methods towards underestimating the length and severity of an episode of PTA. Also, the retrospective method relies on retrospective memory, one's memory for past events, which is not very reliable in healthy individuals, and even less so in patients who have recently experienced a traumatic brain injury (TBI). Patients may also unconsciously or consciously bias their answers because they want to appear more healthy or more ill than they truly were, or because of poor insight. The retrospective method is also flawed because there is no standard measurement procedure. Although the retrospective method may provide useful subjective data, it is not a useful tool for measurement or categorization.

==== GOAT ====
The Galveston Orientation and Amnesia Test (GOAT) is the most frequently used test for assessing PTA in the United States and Canada. The test consists of 10 items that involve the recall of events that occurred right before and after the injury, as well as questions about disorientation. Scores of 75 or more on this scale (out of a total possible score of 100) correspond to the termination of the PTA episode. The GOAT typically classifies orientation into three categories: orientation to the person, orientation to the place, and orientation to the time. The idea behind these questions is that each of these classifications places a large demand on the patient's memory and learning abilities.

==== WPTAS and AWPTAS ====
The Westmead Post-Traumatic Amnesia Scale (WPTAS) is commonly used in Australia and New Zealand. It asks twelve questions that examine orientation to person, place and time, in addition to the ability to consistently remember new information from one day to the next. The scale is administered once each day, until the patient scores 12/12 on three consecutive days. The WPTAS is suitable for patients with moderate-to-severe traumatic brain injury. An abbreviated version of the WPTAS, the Abbreviated Westmead PTA Scale (AWPTAS) assesses patients with mild traumatic brain injury.

===== Drawbacks =====
Although the GOAT has proved useful in acute care, recent research has called attention to some of its drawbacks. The GOAT's assessment of orientation may put too much of a focus on memory as the main mechanism behind orientation. The range of cognitive and behavioral symptoms associated with PTA seems to indicate that the patient's disorientation is more than just a memory deficit. Consequently, it may be beneficial to incorporate tests of other cognitive functions, such as attention, which relate to both memory and orientation.

Another recent study compared the success of the GOAT and the Orientation Log (O-Log) in predicting rehabilitation outcomes, and found that, while the O-Log and the GOAT perform similarly as measures of PTA severity and duration, the O-Log provides a more accurate picture of rehabilitation.

While the GOAT is a useful tool, these results suggest that using alternative methods of assessing PTA may increase the amount of information available to physicians and may help in predicting rehabilitative success. The international cognitive (INCOG) expert panel has recommended the use of a validated PTA scale such as the GOAT or WPTAS for assessing PTA duration in patients with moderate-to-severe traumatic brain injury on a daily basis.

=== Severity ===
The severity of post-traumatic amnesia (PTA) is directly related to its duration, although a longer duration does not necessarily indicate more severe symptoms. The duration of PTA in brain-injured patients is a useful predictor of the expected long-term effects of the injury, along with the duration of loss of consciousness(LOC), and scores on the Glasgow Coma Scale (GCS), which measures degrees of consciousness, with higher scores indicating higher levels of functioning. A score of three indicates complete unconsciousness, and a score of 15 indicates normal functioning.

Levels of TBI severity
	GCS score	duration of PTA	duration of LOC
Mild	13–15	< 1 hour	< 30 minutes
Moderate	9–12	30 minutes – 24 hours	1–24 hours
Severe	3–8	> 1 day	> 24 hours

In patients experiencing PTA for the duration of:

- Up to one hour – the injury is very mild in severity and full recovery is expected. The patient may experience a few minor post-concussive symptoms (e.g. headaches, dizziness).
- 1–24 hours – the injury is moderate in severity and full recovery is expected. The patient may experience some minor post-concussive symptoms (e.g. headaches, dizziness).
- 1–7 days – the injury is severe, and recovery may take weeks to months. The patient may be able to return to work, but may be less capable than before the injury.
- 1–2 weeks – the injury is very severe, and recovery is likely to take many months. The patient is likely to experience long-lasting cognitive effects such as decreased verbal and nonverbal intelligence as well as decreased performance on visual tests. Patients should, however, still be able to return to work.
- 2–12 weeks – the injury is very severe, and recovery is likely to take a year or more. The patient is likely to exhibit permanent deficits in memory and cognitive function, and the patient is unlikely to be able to return to work.
- 12+ weeks – injury is very severe and accompanied by significant disabilities that will require long-term rehabilitation and management. The patient is unlikely to be able to return to work.

Note: return to work is meant to indicate a return to a reasonable level of functionality, both in professional and personal arenas.

The long-term prognosis of PTA is generally positive. Many patients do recover a great deal of cognitive function, although they may not return to their pre-injury state.

== Treatment ==
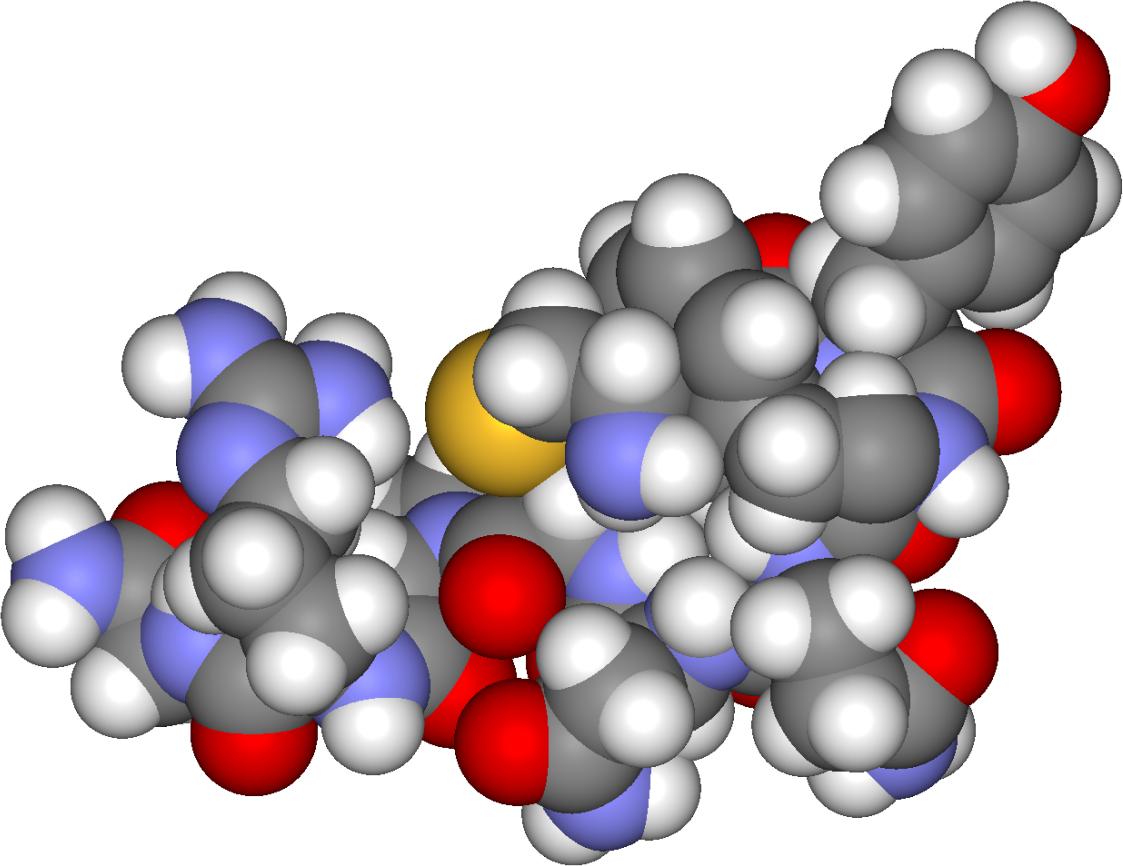
A Vasopressin molecule

=== Vasopressin ===
==== Animal research ====
Early research pointed to vasopressin as a potential treatment for improving the memory of patients living with post-traumatic amnesia (PTA). Lysine vasopressin, a modified form of the vasopressin molecule, had positive effects on memory when administered by injection to patients with amnesia resulting from traumatic brain injury and Korsakoff's syndrome. Subsequent animal studies with rats found similar results, particularly in aversion and avoidance learning tasks. Rats lacking adequate vasopressin, either due to genetic defect or hypophysectomy (surgical removal of the pituitary gland), exhibited significant improvements in memory and learning functions when exogenous vasopressin was administered. Particularly encouraging was the finding that a short treatment period produced long-lasting improvements, in both humans and rats. However, the animal models of PTA are highly limited, as the dimension of self-awareness and orientation is almost impossible to model adequately. PTA in animals, especially rats, is often observed post-trauma (commonly post-surgery), but it is often only measured in terms of impaired learning or unusual behavior.

==== Human studies ====
One subsequent human study found no effects of vasopressin on memory. The nonsignificant results were attributed to the study's many potential flaws, particularly its small sample size, the inability of vasopressin to penetrate the blood brain barrier when administered as a nasal spray, inadequate dosing and differences in severity of head injury between the samples. However, Eames et al. (1999) found statistically significant improvements on several tests of memory with the use of a vasopressin nasal spray, with no reported ill effects. Although the degree of improvement was mild, and it could be attributed to numerous other factors of the rehabilitative program, the lack of any ill effects suggests that vasopressin is, at the least, a possible enhancement for a treatment regimen.

=== Norepinephrine agonists ===
Diaschisis, as mentioned earlier, has been linked to the mechanism of PTA. The noradrenergic systems may play a role in diaschisis. Norepinephrine, also known as noradrenalin, is a catecholamine neurotransmitter. Administering a norepinephrine receptor agonist (a substance that initiates a cell response when it binds with a receptor) to patients promoted the recovery of memory and many other cognitive functions after a traumatic brain injury. Conversely, the administration of norepinephrine antagonists slowed recovery, and could lead to the reinstatement of deficits when administered after recovery. Noradrenergic antagonists were not prescribed for the purposes of slowing the recovery of memory. Rather, these findings are based on the effects of other commonly prescribed drugs that happen to block noradrenergic receptors. The alpha-1 adrenergic receptor is specifically implicated. Although it has not yet been thoroughly investigated, there is potential for stimulants, which promote catecholamine release, to be an effective treatment in the early stages of recovery from brain trauma, and these positive effects could reduce the symptoms of PTA.

== Research ==
=== The North Star Project ===
The North Star Project was developed by researchers at McGill University. Researchers developed a "reality orientation", which involved discussing general facts (e.g. date, time, names of family members, etc.) with amnesic patients twice a day in an attempt to lessen their confusion during the early stages of their recovery. Younger patients often had shorter amnesic episodes than older patients, especially those in the North Star group. Although more improvements were noted in the North Star group than in the control group, researchers did not find a statistically significant effect of their intervention.

==== Findings ====
A comprehensive analysis of literature based on the effects of early rehabilitation of traumatic brain injury concluded that there is no strong evidence linking any one particular practice of post-injury care to a reduced severity in symptoms. However, even in the absence of a concrete correlation between a specific rehabilitation program and improved outcomes, the evidence and research available can provide many good suggestions for how to proceed with treatment. All rehabilitation strategies reviewed had positive effects on recovery, but none more so than the others.

The most accurate measure of determining the length of amnesia is still the a behavioural measure, the duration of the episode of post-traumatic amnesia, rather than a neuroimaging technique or an electrophysiological or biochemical technique. The length of amnesia is also one of the most accurate predictors for determining later cognitive problems, even more so than the duration of either the coma or the period of loss of consciousness. The duration of amnesia after TBI, therefore, can be very useful in the planning the length and intensity of rehabilitation programs for persons affected by PTA.

== History ==
=== C.P. Symonds ===
Although Franklin described PTA, the British physician C. P. Symonds first discussed the specific amnesiac symptoms that often follow a cerebral contusion, which is a specific kind of traumatic brain injury. Symonds observed that the patient remains "stuperose, restless and irritable" after recovering consciousness. He also identified a recovery period of days to weeks for this post-concussive state. Presumably, shorter durations of PTA, which are now included in the definition, were deemed too minor for documentation. Most importantly, he identified the amnesia typically experienced during this period of recovery, and recommended the use of "formal tests for memory and retention" to assess recovery.

=== In WWI soldiers ===
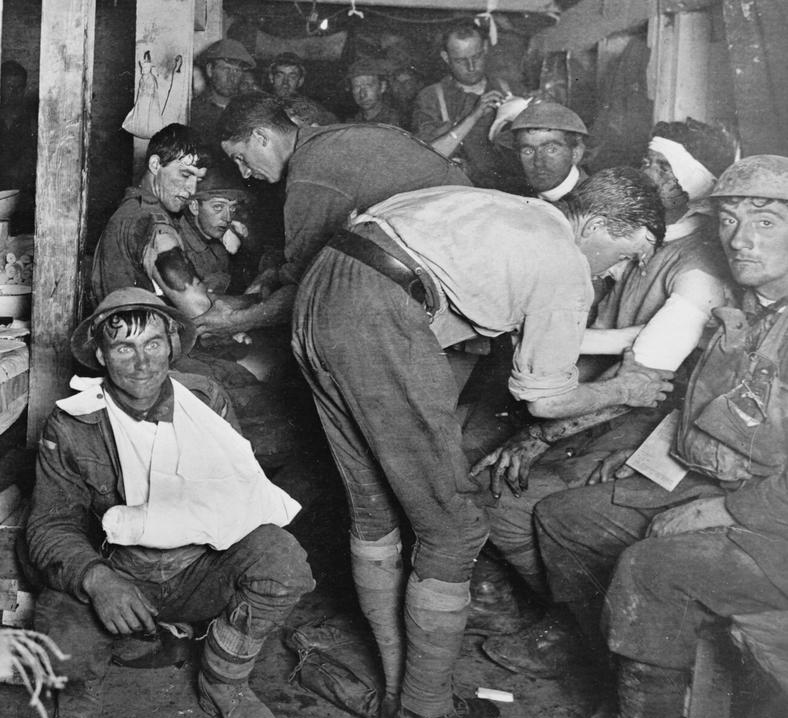
Image from WWI, taken in an Australian dressing station near Ypres in 1917. The wounded soldier in the lower left of the photo has a dazed stare, a frequent symptom of "shell shock".

Although there was a general lack of knowledge about its mechanisms, a review of patients seen during WWI combat reveals the symptoms of post-traumatic amnesia (PTA) in many soldiers. The term shell shock was used to refer to the acute psychological state that accompanied exposure to exploding shells, and more generally, exposure to combat conditions. There are a number of documented cases of people with shell shock . These soldiers commonly displayed dizziness, varying degrees of consciousness, a loss of non-traumatic personal information, and a lack of normal self-awareness lasting anywhere from hours to days. Many of the symptoms of shell shock are highly similar to those of PTA. The following excerpt from a case report illustrates the loss of personal information observed in one patient:

A soldier was assessed three days after having been admitted into a field ambulance. He was unable to give his name, regiment, or number, and he could not be identified. He could remember being found on the outskirts of a village, but his military history and all events in his past including his childhood were a complete blank.

Researchers found that physicians had documented reports of combatants where "[b]oth central and peripheral details of the traumatic experience were lost." Patients displayed gaps in memory recollection for the period following the trauma, sometimes up to the time of hospitalization, which could be weeks later.

An initial assessment supported the role of concussions in causing these symptoms. Concussions could account for the anterograde amnesia and retrograde amnesia observed in patients, as well as the periods of fluctuating consciousness or delirium that sometimes followed. However, many soldiers who showed these amnesiac effects did not experience injuries that would have led to concussions. As a result, there was controversy over the possible causes of PTA in these non-concussed soldiers, with a separation between proponents of Freudian repression and those supporting a dissociative view of the condition. This dissociative view was ultimately supported, and accounted for the fugue state seen in soldiers who were thought to have dissociated from normal consciousness.

== Other psychological disorders ==
Researchers have investigated the relationship between posttraumatic amnesia (PTA) resulting from traumatic brain injury (TBI) and the development of symptoms of posttraumatic stress disorder (PTSD) and acute stress disorder (ASD). 282 outpatients, who were an average of 53 days post-TBI in their recovery, were divided into four groups: PTA episode lasting less than one hour; PTA episode lasting between one hour and 24 hours; PTA episode lasting between 24 hours and one week; and PTA episode lasting for longer than one week. The patients' personal details were used as variables classified for age, gender, marital status, time elapsed between injury and assessment, and type of injury (motor vehicle accident, pedestrian, assault and other). Patients were given two self-report inventories: the Impact of Event Scale (IES) and the General Health Questionnaire (GHQ). The IES measures symptoms of PTSD and contains questions regarding the intrusiveness of the traumatic event (ex. nightmares) and avoidant behaviours related to the traumatic event (ex. avoiding a certain location). The GHQ was used as an indicator of overall psychological health. The majority of subjects were in Group 1 (PTA episode lasting less than one hour), injured in motor vehicle accidents, and male.

There were no statistical differences found with regards to age, gender, marital status and type of injury. There was an increase in the severity of all indicators of brain damage for the longest durations of PTA; specifically, the GCS scores for this group decreased and the number of patients with an abnormal CT scan increased. There were significant differences in IES scores when comparing the group with the least serious episode of PTA, lasting less than an hour, to all other groups, with the duration of the episode of PTA lasting longer than an hour. The group with an episode of PTA lasting less than an hour had higher IES scores and more intrusive and avoidant symptoms. The fact that GHQ scores were constant throughout all groups, although there were differences in IES scores, suggests that the two scores measure different phenomena.

== Aging ==
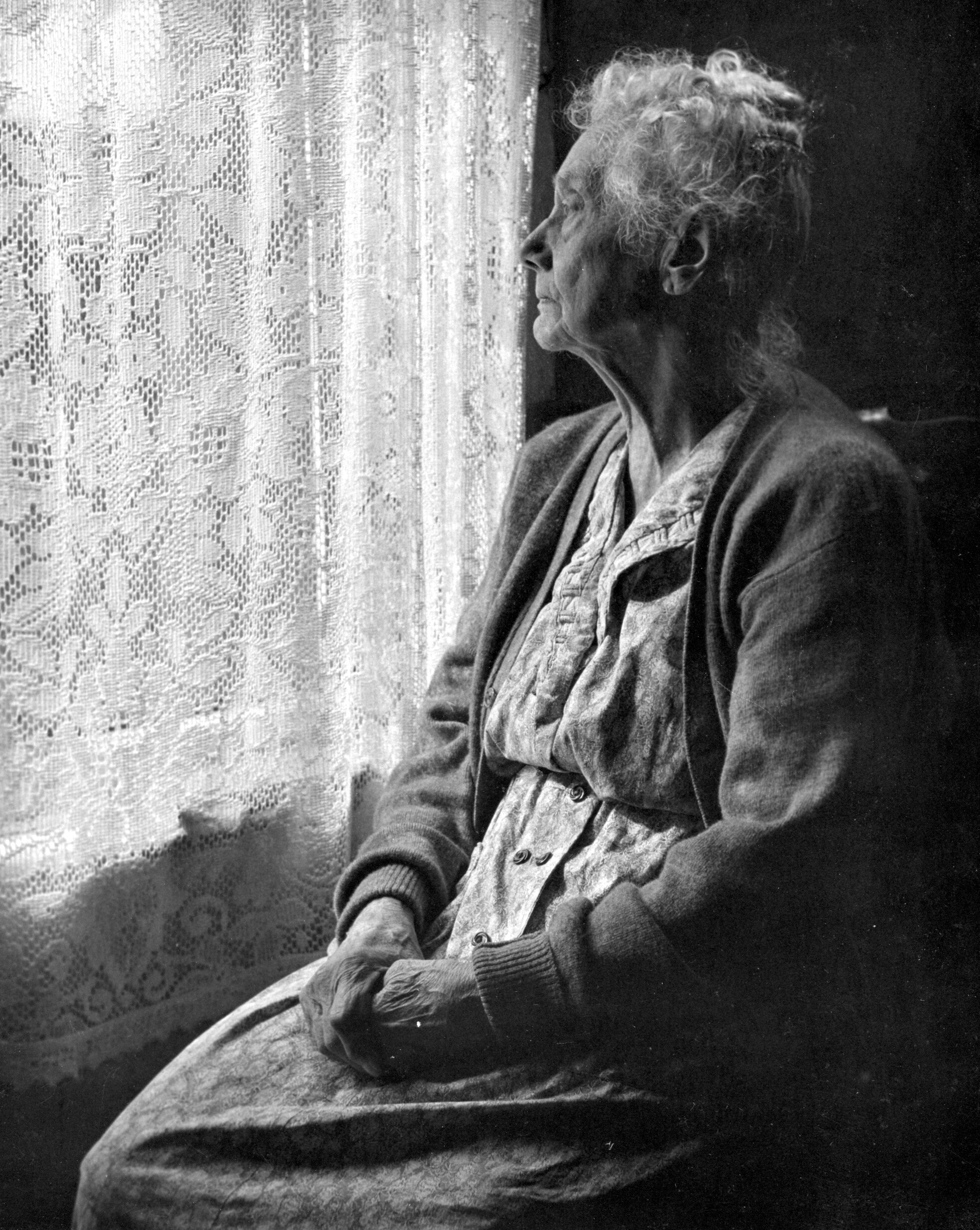
An elderly woman

Grey and white matter are both found in the many areas of the brain, as well as throughout the central nervous system. Grey matter is more involved in nerve function, and white matter is more involved in nerve maintenance, as well as the regulation of unconscious functions. However, both are important for memory and learning. The volume of grey and white matter in the brains of aging individuals has been correlated with working memory and retention of cognitive function. Researchers hypothesized that the lesions of both grey and white matter would be larger in older individuals and in those with more severe traumatic brain injuries, and longer episodes of PTA, and the volume of grey and white matter would be smaller in those injured at an older age. A group of 98 participants, predominantly male, were examined using fMRI. The results supported these hypotheses, leading researchers to suggest that the impact of traumatic brain injury gets more severe as age progresses.

Although grey and white matter volume was reduced throughout the brain, researchers noted that the grey matter of the neocortical brain regions was particularly affected. This is consistent with the fact that older individuals who had experienced PTA showed greater cognitive impairments than a control group of individuals of the same age who had not experienced PTA. The duration of the episode of PTA was related to the size of the grey matter lesion; longer episodes of PTA correlated with larger grey matter lesions. Advanced age also correlated with reduced glial activity. With less grey matter, the patient is less able to retrieve memories effectively, as neuron function is impaired.

== Controversies ==
On the topic of trauma and memory, Richard McNally (2005) wrote that memories are not videotapes of our experiences, meaning that they are not unchangeable records. The mechanism that retrieves a memory involves activation of several areas of the brain. Similarly, the mechanism that encodes a memory requires the use of different parts of the brain. Any fault in the encoding-retrieval system will degrade memory, and there are many potential faults, such as distortion by emotion, or focusing on the peripheral details at the expense of central details. An example of the latter is the well-known phenomenon where a person being robbed at gunpoint is so distracted by the gun that they don't have time to encode the robber's face.

Misconstruing retrieval failure as traumatic amnesia is not the same phenomenon as post-traumatic amnesia, which describes amnesia for the current elapsing time post-trauma, not amnesia for trauma from the past. Typically, "repressed memory" is the term used to explain this sort of traumatic amnesia; the experience was so horrific that the adult cannot process what occurred years before. The topic of repressed memory is controversial within psychology; many clinicians argue for its importance, while researchers remain skeptical of its existence. A more viable explanation for this forgetting is childhood amnesia, a phenomenon describing the fact that most children do not have recall of events in their lives before the age of three, partially due to the lack of development of cognitive elements such as language.
