= Defense Base Act =

The Defense Base Act (DBA) (ch. 357 of the 77th United States Congress, 55 Stat. 622, enacted August 16, 1941, codified at 42 U.S.C. §§ 1651–1654) is an extension of the federal workers' compensation program that covers longshoremen and harbor workers, the Longshore and Harbor Workers' Compensation Act 33 U.S.C. §§ 901–950. The DBA covers persons employed at United States defense bases overseas. The DBA is designed to provide medical treatment and compensation to employees of defense contractors injured in the scope and course of employment. The DBA is administered by the United States Department of Labor.

== Who is covered under the DBA ==
The Defense Base Act covers the following employment activities:

Work for private employers on U.S. military bases or on any lands used by the U.S. for military purposes outside of the United States, including those in U.S. Territories and possessions;

Work on public work contracts with any U.S. government agency, including construction and service contracts in connection with national defense or with war activities outside the United States;

Work on contracts approved and funded by the U.S. under the Foreign Assistance Act, which among other things provides for cash sale of military equipment, materials, and services to its allies, if the contract is performed outside of the United States;

Work for American employers providing welfare or similar services outside the United States for the benefit of the Armed Services, e.g. the United Service Organizations (USO).

Employees of any subcontractors of a contract involved in work detailed above, it is applicable to both US and local national employees.

Generally, workers employed by American contractors performing public works for the U.S. government in U.S. territories, at U.S. military bases located outside the continental United States and in support of military aid programs within allied nations. Also, persons who are employed overseas by welfare and morale projects such as the American Red Cross, the U.S.O. and The Salvation Army are generally covered. "Public Works" is defined in 42 U.S.C. § 1651

Employers subject to the DBA must secure payment of disability, medical, and death benefits, either through an authorized insurance carrier or by qualifying as a self-insurer. If a subcontractor fails to secure payment of compensation, the contractor may be liable for benefits owed to the subcontractor's employees. Failure to secure required compensation can also result in statutory penalties and, for corporate employers, potential personal liability of specified corporate officers for compensation and benefits payable under the Act.

== Technical requirements and filings ==
The DBA incorporates filing and notice rules from the Longshore and Harbor Workers' Compensation Act. An employee generally gives written notice of injury to the employer on Form LS-201 within 30 days, with additional time allowed for certain hearing-loss and occupational-disease claims. A written claim for compensation is filed with the Office of Workers' Compensation Programs (OWCP) on Form LS-203 within one year after the injury or the last payment of compensation, whichever is later. Occupational-disease claims generally must be filed within two years after the employee or eligible survivor becomes aware of the relationship between the disease, death, or disability and the employment.

After receiving notice of an injury, the employer should notify its insurance carrier or, if self-insured, its claims administrator; authorize medical treatment if needed; and file Form LS-202 within 10 days of an injury that causes the loss of one or more work shifts. The Federal Acquisition Regulation clause for DBA-covered contracts requires contractors, before commencing performance, to establish provisions for disability compensation, medical benefits, and death benefits by purchasing workers' compensation insurance or qualifying as a self-insurer, and to maintain those provisions until contract performance is completed.

The Department of Labor identifies ACE-USA, AIG, and CNA as major carriers providing Defense Base Act coverage; OWCP is responsible for authorization of insurance carriers and self-insured employers under the Longshore Act framework. In a 2010 Congressional Research Service report, CRS stated that 97.3% of new DBA cases created from September 2001 through December 2009 were insured by ACE-USA, AIG, CNA, or their subsidiaries.

== Payment of compensation ==
There is a three-day waiting period (the period of time one must wait before compensation is due) under the LHWCA. Thereafter, if an injury is serious enough to prevent the employee from returning to work, the employer (or its insurer) must pay compensation to the injured worker. Under Section 10 of the Act, the amount of compensation paid is generally calculated by taking an employee's wages from the year prior to the injury and dividing by 52. This is known as the average weekly wage (AWW).

If the employee has worked in the same job for the entire period, the calculation is simple enough. If the employee has not worked "substantially the whole year" in the same type of employment, alternate methods may be used to determine AWW. A similar employee's wages can be used, or if 33 U.S.C. § 910 Sections (a) or (b) cannot be fairly applied, there are several alternatives such as taking a daily wage and multiplying it by the number of days per week ordinarily worked. Courts are split on the issue of whether lower stateside earnings should be used to determine AWW and compensation rated.

Once the average weekly wage (AWW) is established, this is multiplied by two-thirds and this figure, the compensation rate (CR) is the amount of money the injured worker receives for each week they are disabled. The maximum rate changes periodically. Generally, DBA insurers pay every two weeks. The Act provides for annual cost of living or inflation increases for benefits which are permanent and total.

Benefits are generally paid until the injured worker returns to work or is capable of returning to work and suitable work is available. For example, if an injured worker fully recovers from an injury and can return to work, total disability benefits end. Also, even if an injured worker cannot return to his regular job due to a physicians restrictions, compensation ends if the employer offers the employee suitable work. Short of offering a job, the employer/insurer may stop compensation for total disability if it can prove suitable jobs exist in the employees commuting area. If those jobs do not meet or exceed the injured worker's previously established AWW, the employer/carrier may have to pay either partial disability benefits or a "scheduled award," depending on the nature of the original injury.

There are certain injuries subject to a scheduled award. For example, an injured worker with an arm injury who is at maximum medical improvement (MMI) with a 10% permanent impairment rating (and work is available) is entitled to a scheduled award—but no further disability benefits unless there is a change in condition. However, a person with a back injury at MMI would still be entitled to total disability benefits if they can prove they made a diligent but unsuccessful attempt to find suitable work. This is normally a litigated issue, and many scenarios may come into play. For a list of "scheduled injuries', see 33 U.S.C. § 908.

Maximum medical improvement is a medical term that means the employee has recovered from injuries as much as can be expected, and medical providers have done everything they can. If the employee reached this point and still cannot work, they may be entitled to "permanent and total" (PTD) disability benefits. These benefits are generally reserved for those injured workers who will most likely be unable to work for the rest of their lives. This benefit carries with it an automatic cost of living allowance.

== Medical treatment ==
Entitlement and scope of medical treatment is described in Section 7 of the Longshore & Harbor Workers' Compensation Act (LHWCA), That Section provides:

(a) General requirement The employer shall furnish such medical, surgical, and other attendance or treatment, nurse and hospital service, medicine, crutches, and apparatus, for such period as the nature of the injury or the process of recovery may require.

(b) Physician selection; administrative supervision; change of physicians and hospitals The employee shall have the right to choose an attending physician authorized by the Secretary to provide medical care under this chapter as hereinafter provided. If, due to the nature of the injury, the employee is unable to select his physician and the nature of the injury requires immediate medical treatment and care, the employer shall select a physician for him. The Secretary shall actively supervise the medical care rendered to injured employees, shall require periodic reports as to the medical care being rendered to injured employees, shall have authority to determine the necessity, character, and sufficiency of any medical aid furnished or to be furnished, and may, on his own initiative or at the request of the employer, order a change of physicians or hospitals when in his judgment such change is desirable or necessary in the interest of the employee or where the charges exceed those prevailing within the community for the same or similar services or exceed the provider's customary charges. Change of physicians at the request of employees shall be permitted in accordance with regulations of the Department of Labor, Secretary.

== Settlement and attorneys' fees ==
Section 8(i) provides a mechanism under which all or part of a claim under the DBA may be settled. Settlements are voluntary and one party cannot compel the other to settle. Like most other workers' compensation systems, there are no damages such as pain and suffering. The amount of the settlement depends on what the employer/insurer could expect to pay if the case is not settled. Also, while there is a program where an Administrative Law Judge (ALJ) will mediate a case for the parties, there is no provision in the Act that allows an injured worker or employer/insurer to present the case before an ALJ to determine its value.

The parties to a claim may be represented by an attorney, or a qualified non-attorney. All attorneys' fees and expenses must be approved by the Department of Labor. DBA attorneys are paid based on an hourly rate and level of success on behalf of their clients, and contingency fees are not permitted. Any fees are generally paid after litigation or at settlement. Attorneys fees can be assessed against the Claimant, or paid by the employer/insurer in certain circumstances. Procedurally, after a hearing or lump sum settlement, if the injured worker prevails, their attorney submits a Fee Petition to the Department of Labor for approval. The employer/insurer is given the opportunity to respond to the petition. If a claim is settled, the fee is generally paid by the insurer and may be subject to negotiation with the insurer as part of the settlement package. These fees are also subject to approval of either the Administrative Law Judge or the District Director of the Office of Workers' Compensation Programs (OWCP).

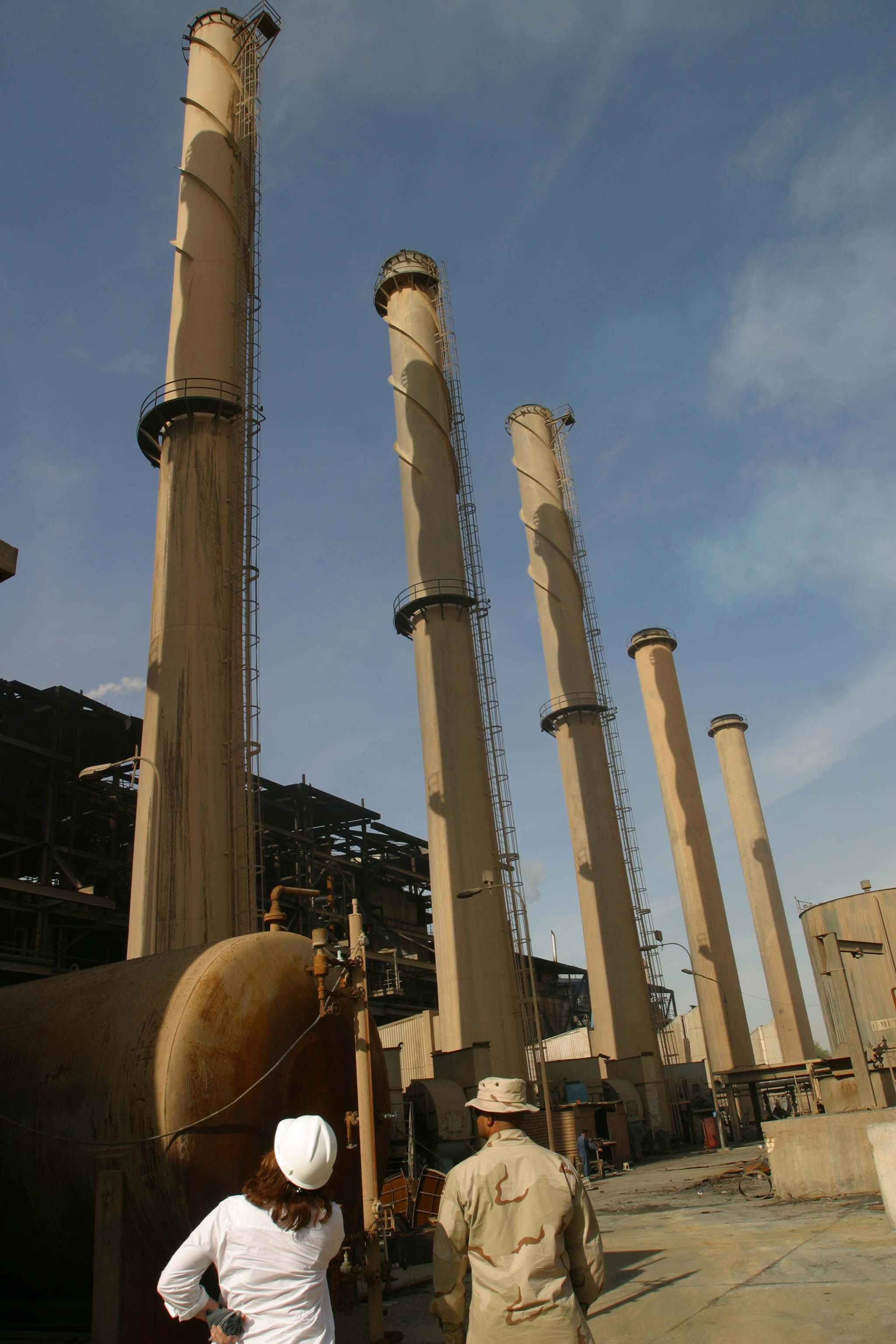
Baghdad Power Plant Photo USAID Government photo -- credit: Thomas Hartwell Engineers make a site inspection at the Baghdad South power plant. USAID is funding the repair of Iraq's nationwide electrical system, which consist of some 29 major generating plants, transmission grids and local substations. Baghdad South, like many other power facilities, is in great disrepair.

== History ==
Defense Base Act

The Defense Base Act, P.L.77-208, was enacted in 1941 and extended workers'compensation coverage under the Longshore and Harbor Workers' Compensation Act (LHWCA) to persons working on American military bases that were either acquired by the United States from foreign countries or that were located outside of the continental United States. Coverage was extended to public works contractors working outside of the United States in 1942 with the enactment of the War Hazards Compensation Act, P.L. 77-784, which also established the War Hazards Compensation Act (WHCA) program. The most significant amendments to the DBA were enacted in 1958 and extended coverage to non-citizens, to persons working on projects funded under the Mutual Security Act of 1954, and to persons working to provide morale and welfare services, such as through the United Service Organization (USO).

== Contingency contracting and federal oversight ==
The Defense Base Act became more prominent during U.S. military and reconstruction operations in Iraq and Afghanistan, when federal agencies used large numbers of civilian contractors overseas. CRS reported in 2010 that, since September 2001, there had been 49,472 DBA cases, including 1,584 cases involving contractor deaths in Iraq and Afghanistan, and that nearly $200 million in cash and medical benefits was paid to DBA claimants in 2008.

The Government Accountability Office reviewed DBA insurance in 2005 after federal agencies, including the Departments of Defense and State and the U.S. Agency for International Development, issued Iraq-related reconstruction and support contracts. GAO stated that DBA insurance issues had drawn congressional attention because contractor employees were working amid continued violence and because the federal government was generally reimbursing contractors for DBA insurance costs. GAO recommended that Congress consider requiring the Office of Management and Budget, in coordination with the Departments of Defense, Labor, and State and USAID, to evaluate current and future DBA insurance needs, options, and risks.

A later GAO report reviewed the State Department's transition from a single-insurer DBA program to an open-market system. GAO found that State contractors' DBA premiums increased after the transition, but that the increases were in a range similar to those likely under the prior single-insurer program. GAO also recommended that State assess whether the open-market system best served its needs and evaluate the transition's effect on small businesses.

== See also ==
- 42 U.S.C. §§ 1651–1654
- 33 U.S.C. § 910
