= John Winkler =

John Winkler may refer to:

- John E. Winkler (1941–2007), author and photographer
- John J. Winkler (1943–1990), American philologist and Benedictine monk

== See also ==
- Johannes Winkler (disambiguation)
