= Wickler =

Wickler is a German surname. Notable people with the surname include:

- Clemens Wickler (born 1995), German beach volleyball player
- Wolfgang Wickler (1931-2024), German zoologist, behavioral researcher, and publicist
- Hans-Heinrich Winkler (born 1954), East German luger, whose name is alternatively spelled as Wickler

== See also ==
- Wicker (surname)
- Winckler
