= Transneuronal degeneration =

Nerve degeneration

Transneuronal degeneration is the death of neurons resulting from the disruption of input from or output to other nearby neurons. It is an active excitotoxic process when a neuron is overstimulated by a neurotransmitter (most commonly glutamate) causing the dysfunction of that neuron (either damaging it or killing it) which drives neighboring neurons into metabolic deficit, resulting in rapid, widespread loss of neurons. This can be either anterograde or retrograde, indicating the direction of the degeneration relative to the original site of damage (see types). There are varying causes for transneuronal degeneration such as brain lesions, disconnection syndromes, respiratory chain deficient neuron interaction, and lobectomies. Although there are different causes, transneuronal degeneration generally results in the same effects (whether they be cellular, dendritic, or axonal) to varying degrees. Transneuronal degeneration is thought to be linked to a number of diseases, most notably Huntington's disease and Alzheimer's disease, and researchers recently have been performing experiments with monkeys and rats, monitoring lesions in different parts of the body to study more closely how exactly the process works.

== Types ==
Transneuronal degeneration can be grouped into two general categories: anterograde and retrograde.

=== Anterograde transneuronal degeneration ===
Anterograde transneuronal degeneration is degeneration caused by loss of inputs; it occurs when a neuron in the central nervous system is damaged and causes the degeneration of a postsynaptic neuron associated with a similar function as the presynaptic neuron. It is often termed "dying forward," and is also referred to as trans-synaptic degeneration. Anterograde degeneration can occur at a late stage of brain injury and result in diaschisis.

=== Retrograde transneuronal degeneration ===
Retrograde transneuronal degeneration is degeneration caused by loss of trophic support from the target. It occurs in presynaptic cells that are sending inputs to injured postsynaptic cells. It is often termed "dying backward." This type of degeneration can be seen in Amyotrophic lateral sclerosis. Loss of Betz cells is a variable effect of this disease but the loss of these cells in this disease demonstrates the “dying-back” (axonopathy) due to the changes in upper motor neurons.

== Presentation ==
=== Associated diseases ===
==== Huntington's disease and multiple system atrophy ====
A study done shows that after excitotoxic injury to the striatum of adult rats, anterograde transneuronal degeneration occurs in the substantia nigra pars reticulata. This results in cell death that is non-apoptotic. More studies need to be done; however, it is hypothesized that this can be related to Huntington's disease and multiple system atrophy in which there is major striatal neuronal loss followed by considerable loss of neurons in the substantia nigra pars reticulata.

==== Alzheimer's disease ====
The reorganization of cellular structures that results from transneuronal degeneration can be seen in Alzheimer's disease. It is hypothesized that anterograde transneuronal degeneration causes the hyperphosphorylation of the tau protein and redistributing those proteins from the axon to the dendrites, which begins the breakdown of routing and sorting mechanisms.

==== Cockayne syndrome ====
Cockayne syndrome results from a mutation in genes that interfere with transcription-coupled repair of nuclear and mitochondrial DNA, replication, and transcription. Neuronal death is predominantly in the cerebellum, but this disease also causes apoptosis in purkinje cells and causes them to have dystrophic dendrites. Loss of sensory receptors in the cochlea, vestibules, and retina result in ganglion degeneration and transneuronal degeneration. Demyelination also results as oligodendrocytes and Schwann cells are killed.

==== Amyotrophic lateral sclerosis ====
Evidence supports the theory that amyotrophic lateral sclerosis causes anterograde dengeneration of corticomotoneurons. The hyperexcitable corticomotoneurons drive anterior horn cells into metabolic deficit, resulting in cell degeneration and death. If this exocitotoxic process occurs rapidly, it results in a more rapid death of anterior horn cells resulting in lower motor neuron disease.

== Causes ==
There are several different mechanisms by which transneuronal degeneration can occur. The technical cause of transneuronal degeneration is the death of neurons resulting from the disruption of input from or output to other nearby neurons.

=== Lesions ===
Anterograde and retrograde transneuronal degeneration is typically seen in humans around lesions in the limbic, visual, or dentate-rubro-olivary pathways. Lesions to the brain cause pathological changes that can cause anterograde transneuronal degeneration and lead to system degeneration. Brain lesions create structural or transient deafferentation (the interruption or elimination of sensory nerve impulses by injuring or damaging sensory nerve fibers) because injury to the area causes a loss of excitatory input to other areas in the brain, causing them to be less responsive to stimuli. Delayed secondary transneuronal degeneration can also occur at a late stage after brain injury because after the period of latency, neuroplastic rearrangement follows deafferentation. This deafferentation creates interruption of complex circuitry, which can lead to transneuronal structural degeneration. Although studies have shown that lesions can lead to transneuronal degeneration, lesions in the somatic motor system might not cause it. There is not much information on how transneuronal degeneration affects the somatic motor system . Anterograde transneuronal degeneration is not likely to happen since motor neurons are often exhibit convergence (receive input from wide variety of afferent systems). Transneuronal degeneration of lower motor neurons is not present after upper motor neuron lesions in stroke patients. In addition cortico spinal tract lesions do not cause anterograde transneuronal degeneration of spinal anterior horn cells.

=== Disconnection syndrome ===
Disconnection syndromes, defined as any neurologic disorder caused by an interruption in impulse transmission along cerebral fiber pathways, can cause white matter brain lesions, leading to secondary neuronal loss and transneuronal degeneration. Secondary neuronal loss occurs as a result in areas that are strongly connected with the severed tracts or restricted cortex during an anterior temporal lobectomy. Temporal lobe lesions also cause transneuronal degeneration, the effects of which can be seen in the fornix, mammillary bodies, and contralateral cerebellum.

=== Respiratory chain-deficient neuron development ===
It has recently been shown that transneuronal degeneration can also be caused after respiratory chain-deficient neurons develop from de novo mitochondrial DNA mutations, which are normally associated with mammalian ageing. The respiratory chain-deficient neurons have adverse effect on normal adjacent neurons, inducing death by means of transneuronal degeneration. Transneuronal degeneration in these cases is accelerated during the ageing process since other cellular maintenance systems are already damaged as well as in the presence of mitochondrial disease, where non-neuronal cells like glial cells and astrocytes also have respiratory chain deficiency. This also means that transneuronal degeneration could enhance the consequences of patients with degenerative processes like Alzheimer’s disease (see associated diseases) because of the neuronal damage from lesions already present. Since neurons are linked in trophic units, this transneuronal degeneration can lead to substantial cell death over time.

=== Lobectomy ===
Removing portions of an animal's brain can be performed to induce transneuronal degeneration. Transneuronal degeneration results after a sudden massive loss of input from the olfactory bulb after it was removed. Removal of the left hemisphere in monkeys caused retrograde transneuronal degeneration of the retinal ganglion cells that affected mainly the foveal rim. This also resulted in reduction in the number of neurons in the parvocellular and magnocellular layers. Evidence of retinal ganglion cell loss consistent with retrograde trans-synaptic degeneration has also been demonstrated in-vivo with optical coherence tomography in humans.

== Pathophysiology ==
=== Cellular ===
Transneuronal degeneration creates many telling characteristics in affected cells. The cells themselves tend to shrink, which is best seen in cytoplasmic and nuclear shrinkage. The nucleic acid material becomes reorganized and the distinction between nucleus and cytoplasm becomes diminished. The nuclear membrane often becomes detached. This causes an increase in electron density in the cytoplasm due to the increased concentration of cytoplasmic and nucleic contents. This nucleus degeneration occurs in a later stage than the cytoplasmic effects and results in an increase of condensed chromatin aggregation. The nucleolus also gets replaced with a large homogenous cluster of electron dense material. There appears to be an increase in free ribosomes, though the endoplasmic reticulum does not seem to lose any ribosomes. Mitochondria, endoplasmic reticulum, Golgi apparatus and multivesicular bodies all appear to swell, though this can be best seen in the mitochondria which appear to swell first. Lysosomes do not appear to be affected, but there is an appearance of large, empty vacuoles in the cytoplasm.

=== Dendritic and axonal ===
Transneuronal degeneration affects dendrites and axons as well. There is evident shrinkage in the main dendritic shafts. The concentration of free ribosomes increases and there is a noticeable increase in the granular background of the cytoplasm. In the initial parts of the dendrites, mitochondrial swelling and dilation can be seen. This swelling can also be seen in the endoplasmic reticulum and the golgi apparatuses. The most notable effect is the dense packing of neurotubules (neuronal microtubules). In severely affected cells, this packing greatly reduces the intertubular space to no wider than the tubule. In examining the cells, the tubular outline becomes more pronounced. In axons, similar effects can be seen. There is swelling in mitochondria and other membrane bound organelles. There is also a marked increase in cytoplasmic granularity and the dense packing of the neurotubules. Despite these alterations, synaptic specializations appear unchanged.

=== Degrees of degeneration ===
There are varying degrees of degeneration. In mild degeneration the cytoplasmic areas shrinks and increases in density and mitochondria swell. However, the endomplasmic reticulum and the golgi apparatuses appear unchanged. The nuclear membrane appears intact, but there is some loss in differentiation in nuclear material. In more severely affected cells, the separation between the cytoplasm and nucleus diminishes significantly, causing the cytoplasm to become even more dense and have an increase in electron density. Neuroglia cells are only affected in severe cases. They fill in the spaces that have been diminished due to the loss or atrophy of the dendritic terminals. Astrocytes and microglia cells digest the decaying organelles and dying neurons through phagocytosis.

== Research ==
=== Eye enucleation in macaque monkeys ===
Many studies have been done on monkeys and rats to see the development of transneuronal degeneration after damage to various parts of the brain. Enucleation of the eye creates transneuronal degeneration. A study was done performing enucleation of the eye on macaque monkeys to determine if this degeneration would lead to loss of neurons. It was the first experiment done on adult animals to show evidence of loss of neurons after one year, a long survival period for those affected cells. The degeneration led to cell shrinkage and cell death, and these symptoms were more profound after one year than during the first four months.

=== Olfactory removal in rats ===
Another study being done is on rats in which the olfactory bulb is removed has resulted in neurons in the primary olfactory cortex becoming argyrophilic in silver infused preparations. This allows the researchers to view the cells under electron microscopes and see that these cells rapidly degenerate. The first signs of degeneration seen after the removal of the bulb was mitochondrial swelling and then an increase in electron density in the cytoplasm. Nuclear changes are seen later in which chromatin condenses and the nucleolus becomes replaced with large clusters of electron dense material. Once the degeneration has advanced far enough, ribosomes begin to disperse throughout the cell. Some cells are then phagocytosed by astrocytes and microglia. This study showed that the most cells affected by the necrosis were not directly connected to the olfactory bulb, but were located closer more superficially. This provided them with them hypothesis that olfactory bulb removal results in transneuronal deafferentation as a result of the massive sudden loss of input from the removed brain tissue.

=== Unilateral perforant pathway transection in rats and mice ===
Unilateral perforant pathway transection is a method to study how transneuronal degeneration results from denervation in the Central Nervous System. Studies are still being done to solidify to connection between candidate molecules creating changes in the central nervous system and postleisonal changes. Current studies in rats and mice have provided evidence that microglia cells contribute to transneuronal degeneration of parvalbumin-positive dendrites. Denervation in the entorhinal-hippicampal area of control in mice brains resulted in anterograde neuronal degeneration. This resulted in a smaller microglia response in that area when stimulated in comparison to the wild type group.
