= Westmead Post-Traumatic Amnesia Scale =

- Purpose: Determine length of post-traumatic amnesia following traumatic brain injury

The Westmead Post-traumatic Amnesia Scale (WPTAS) is a brief bedside standardised test that measures length of post-traumatic amnesia (PTA) in people with traumatic brain injury. It consists of twelve questions that assess orientation to person, place and time, and ability to consistently retain new information from one day to another. It is administered once a day, each and every day, until the patient achieves a perfect score across three consecutive days, after which the individual is deemed to have emerged from post-traumatic amnesia. PTA may be deemed to be over on the first day of a recall of 12 for those who have been in PTA for greater than four weeks. The WPTAS is the most common post-traumatic amnesia scale used in Australia and New Zealand.

While other tests of post-traumatic amnesia, such as the Galveston Orientation and Amnesia Test, tend to focus on the patient’s memories of the injury, which rely on potentially biased recall and unverifiable information, the WPTAS is composed of objective items that examine orientation and the ability to consistently retain simple information from one day to another.

An abbreviated version of the WPTAS, the Abbreviated Westmead PTA Scale (AWPTAS), has been developed to assess patients with mild traumatic brain injury.

== Rationale and Development ==
The WPTAS was created in the 1980s and is an extension of The Oxford Scale. It was developed in response to the need for an objective measure of PTA following traumatic brain injury that examines not only orientation to person, place and time, but also crucially the ability to consistently remember new information from one day to another.

The rationale for devising a post traumatic amnesia scale that adequately measures the ability to reliably lay down new memories is based on the “islands of memory” phenomenon, not uncommonly seen in the acute stages of severe traumatic brain injury, and recognised as early as 1932 by W.R. Russell. Russell observed that patients in the acute stage of a brain injury may demonstrate brief periods of sound memory of their surroundings, though such moments of clarity were nevertheless often found to be followed by further periods of confusion and amnesia. Symonds & Russell subsequently warn that it is an error to assume an individual has emerged from PTA based on his or her apparent sound awareness and memory at one particular point of observation; an error which may result in underestimating PTA duration.

== Testing ==
The WPTAS takes approximately three minutes and is administered according to specific guidelines. The scale is first administered once a patient is conscious and able to communicate (either verbally or non-verbally).

On the first administration, the patient is asked seven questions related to orientation (e.g. “what day of the week is it?”). Thus, the most a patient can score on the first day of testing is 7/7. Following the seven questions, the patient is then given the opportunity to learn information which will form part of five additional memory questions that are asked on subsequent PTA testing. This includes the patient being shown three pictures and being specifically asked to remember the three pictures for tomorrow when they are tested again. For each subsequent day, the patient is asked the seven orientation questions and the five memory questions. Thus, from the second day of testing onwards the test is out of 12. The three pictures that the individual needs to remember remain the same for each daily administration until the patient achieves a perfect score of 12/12. When the patient achieves 12/12, the patient is then asked to remember three different pictures for the next day. Testing is ceased once a patient achieves 12/12 on three consecutive days. Duration of PTA is calculated as being from the time of the accident until the first day of the three consecutive days in which the individual achieves a score of 12/12. That is, the beginning point in which the individual demonstrated continuous memory across three consecutive days, or the first day of a score of 12 for those patients who have been in PTA for greater than four weeks.

The WPTAS is administered in a quiet environment that does not contain obvious cues around the patient that could assist them with answering the orientation questions (e.g. clocks or calendars). The scale can be adapted to be used for patients who are unable to communicate verbally.

The severity of injury is based on the time it takes for an individual to emerge from PTA. The Westmead PTA Scale utilises the severity classification system developed by previous PTA research.

Duration of PTA	Severity	Appropriate Measure
Less than 24 hours	Mild	AWPTAS
1–7 days	Severe	WPTAS
1–4 weeks	Very Severe	WPTAS
> 4 weeks	Extremely Severe	WPTAS

WPTAS Severity Classification

Given the design of the scale, The WPTAS is only appropriate to use for individuals with PTA duration greater than 24 hours. An abbreviated version of the WPTAS, the AWPTAS, can be used to measure PTA duration in individuals with a PTA of less than 24 hours.

== Research ==
The WPTAS was designed for patients with closed traumatic brain injury, and subsequent research on the scale has centred on this clinical population. The WPTAS has been found to have high interrater reliability and predictive validity.

Although originally designed for assessing PTA in adult populations, preliminary normative data from hospitalised non head-injured children suggests that the WPTAS may be suitable for use in children as young as eight years of age. Research suggests that the WPTAS may not be appropriate in children younger than seven years of age given that very few non head-injured 6-7 year olds are able to achieve the required criteria of the scale (i.e. perfect scores across three consecutive days).

== Abbreviated Westmead PTA Scale ==
The AWPTAS, derived from the Revised WPTAS, includes the five verbal orientation items from the Glasgow Coma Scale (GCS) and three picture cards used to measure memory. The RWPTAS has been shown to be more accurate than the Glasgow Coma Scale in the identification of cognitive deficits in patients with mild TBI. The A-WPTAS is administered hourly rather than daily. It is used for measuring the length of PTA following a mild traumatic brain injury (that is, when PTA is less than 24 hours).

The AWPTAS is administered according to specific guidelines. A patient is considered to be out of PTA the first time they attain optimal scores of 18 out of 18 (15 out of 15 on the GCS, 3 out of 3 on the picture cards.
