= Harold Winkler =

Harold or Harald Winkler may refer to:

- Harold Winkler of End Conscription Campaign
- Hal Winkler (1894–1956), Harold Winkler, Canadian ice hockey goaltender
- Harald Winkler (born 1962), Austrian bobsledder

== See also ==
- Harry Winkler (disambiguation)
