= Henry Winkler (disambiguation) =

Henry Winkler (born 1945) is an American actor.

Henry Winkler may also refer to:

- Henry R. Winkler (1916–2012), American academic and college administrator

== See also ==
- Heinrich August Winkler (born 1938), German historian
- Harry Winkler (disambiguation)
- Henry Winkles (1801–1860), English architectural illustrator, engraver and printer
