= Galveston Orientation and Amnesia Test =

- Purpose: measure of orientation/attention

The Galveston Orientation and Amnesia Test (GOAT) is a measure of attention and orientation, especially to see if a patient has recovered from post-traumatic amnesia (PTA) after a traumatic brain injury. This was the first measure created to test post-traumatic amnesia, and is still the most widely used test. The test was created by Harvey S. Levin and colleagues (1979), and features ten questions that assess temporal and spatial orientation, biographical recall, and memory. Points are awarded for responses to each question, with a 100 points possible. A score greater than 78 for three consecutive days is considered the threshold for emergence from post-traumatic amnesia. This test is intended for patients aged 15 years or older. Younger patients are given a modified version of the test, known as the Children's Orientation and Attention Test (COAT).

The scores on this test have been found to relate to both the Glasgow Coma Scale and the Glasgow Outcome Scale.

== Modified versions ==
=== MOAT ===
A modified version of this test, known as MOAT or Modified GOAT, is a similar questionnaire that assesses memory, orientation, and attention. This modified version has multiple choice options for those who have expressive-language difficulties or who are intubated. Here, a score of greater than 60 for two consecutive days is considered emergence from PTA.

=== COAT ===
The Children's Orientation and Attention Test (COAT) is a pediatric version of the test for ages 3–15. This test assesses orientation by asking the child or adolescent to give their first and last names, their parents' names, and to identify their current location.
