= Disability Rating Scale =

Traumatic brain injury assessment scale

- Purpose: tracks a traumatic brain injury

The Disability Rating Scale (DRS) was developed as a way to track a traumatic brain injury (TBI) patient from 'Coma to Community'. The scale was used to rate the effects of injury and decide how long recovery might take. The rating gives insight into the cognitive impairment of the individual with the TBI.

The idea of the DRS is similar to the Glasgow Outcome Scale (GOS). However, the point of the scale is to track the patient's progress over time while the GOS is used to simply determine the extent of a brain injury. In many ways, the DRS addresses many of the shortcomings of the GOS.

Training is not required to be able to administer the DRS. However, there is an optional video and powerpoint presentation. The test itself takes anywhere from 1 minute to 30 minutes to administer. It can be self-administered or done through an interview.

== History ==
M. Rappaport introduced the DRS in 1982 to overcome the poor precision of the Glasgow Outcome Scale. It was initially developed to assess individuals with TBI in the rehabilitation phase of recovery. Upon development it was tested with older juvenile and adult individuals who had severe TBI. All tests were performed in an inpatient rehabilitation setting. The intent of the scale was to measure the general functional changes of the patient throughout the course of recovery. It was broken down into percentages.

== Uses and Effectiveness ==
The Disability Rating Scale (DRS) is primarily used to assess impairment, disability, and handicap of an individual. An impairment rating is based on the Glasgow Outcome Scale, such as "Eye Opening," "Communication Ability," and "Motor Response." Disability assesses the cognitive ability of the individual. Handicap assesses the individual's ability to function within society.

Based on single assessments, the DRS is "used to predict ability to return to employment based on admission and discharge." Eliason and Topp have had success in using the DRS for its predictive capabilities on hospital length of stay and discharge for patients with acute brain dysfunctions.

The DRS's major advantage comes from its ability to track a patient's rehabilitation progress. First, its flexibility and ease in assessing a patient makes progress tracking very accommodating. The assessor requires little training for accurate completion and approximately fifteen minutes to score. The patient can perform the assessment retrospectively or it can be done using medical history. Secondly, the scale allows effective tracking of progress. The scale is strongest and most sensitive in scaling general behavioral disability. The DRS becomes more accurate when used in tandem with the Functional Independence Measure (FIM), a more detailed measurement of functionality.

The DRS has a few disadvantages. Some sources claim the inter-rater reliability to be well established, while others report a high variability. Implementation also requires more specialized training by the rater. Because of its strength in general assessment, the DRS has difficulty in specific functional assessment and consequently has difficulty in assessing mild to severe functional impairment; this flaw can easily be overcome by following the assessment up with the FIM, which measures functionality in more detail.
