= Modified Rankin Scale =

Measure of neurological disability

- Purpose: measure degree of disability (stroke)

The modified Rankin Scale (mRS) is a commonly used scale for measuring the degree of disability or dependence in the daily activities of people who have suffered a stroke or other causes of neurological disability. It has become the most widely used clinical outcome measure for stroke clinical trials.

The scale was originally introduced in 1957 by Dr. John Rankin of Stobhill Hospital, Glasgow, Scotland as a 5-level scale ranging from 1 to 5. It was then modified by either van Swieten et al. or perhaps Prof. C. Warlow's group at Western General Hospital in Edinburgh for use in the UK-TIA study in the late 1980s to include the value '0' for patients who had no symptoms. As late as 2005 the scale was still being reported as ranging from 0 to 5. Somewhere between 2005 and 2008 the final change was made to add the value '6' to designate patients who had died. The modern version of modified version differs from Rankin's original scale mainly in the addition of grade 0, indicating a lack of symptoms, and the addition of grade 6 indicating dead.

Interobserver reliability of the mRS can be improved by using a structured questionnaire during the interview process and by having raters undergo a multimedia training process. The multimedia mRS training system which was developed by Prof. K. Lees' group at the University of Glasgow is available online. The mRS is frequently criticized for its subjective nature which is viewed as skewing results, but is used throughout hospital systems to assess rehabilitation needs and outpatient course. These criticisms were addressed by researchers creating structured interviews which ask simple questions both the patient and/or the caregiver can respond to.

More recently, several tools have been developed to more systematically determine the mRS, including the mRS-SI, the RFA, and the mRS-9Q. The mRS-9Q is in the public domain and free web calculators are available at modifiedrankin.com and mdcalc.com.

== The Modified Rankin Scale (mRS) ==
The scale runs from 0–6, running from perfect health without symptoms to death.

- 0 - No symptoms.
- 1 - No significant disability. Able to carry out all usual activities, despite some symptoms.
- 2 - Slight disability. Able to look after own affairs without assistance, but unable to carry out all previous activities.
- 3 - Moderate disability. Requires some help, but able to walk unassisted.
- 4 - Moderately severe disability. Unable to attend to own bodily needs without assistance, and unable to walk unassisted.
- 5 - Severe disability. Requires constant nursing care and attention, bedridden, incontinent.
- 6 - Dead.

== See also ==
- Barthel scale
- Glasgow outcome scale
- strokecenter.org list of stroke assessment scales (external link)
