= Winckler =

Winckler is a surname. Notable people with the surname include:

- Andrew Stuart Winckler (1949–2007), British financial regulator
- Arnold von Winckler (1856–1945), Prussian military officer and World War I general
- Charles Winckler (1867–1932), Danish athlete and tug of war competitor
- Cindy Winckler (born 1950), the Iowa State Representative from the 86th District
- Gustav Winckler (disambiguation), several people
- Heinz Winckler (born 1978), South African singer
- Hugo Winckler, (1863–1913), German archaeologist and historian
- Ida Winckler (1907–1995), Danish painter and textile artist
- Johann Heinrich Winckler (1703–1770), German physicist and philosopher
- John R. Winckler (1916–2001), American experimental physicist
- Josef Winckler (1881–1966), German novelist
- Jutta Hering-Winckler (born 1948), lawyer and patron of music
- Llewellyn Winckler (born 1987), Namibian rugby union player
- Martin Winckler (born 1955), French writer
- Ruby Winckler (1886–1974), Australian painter and children's book illustrator
- William Winckler (born 1964), American actor and independent filmmaker

== See also ==
- Winkler (surname)
