= Todd Winkler =

American convicted killer

- Born: Todd Carl Winkler c. 1967; Iowa, United States
- Occupations: Former fighter pilot, pharmaceutical executive
- Known for: Murder of Rachel Winkler
- Spouse: Rachel Winkler (m. 2005–2012; her death)
- Children: 3
- Status: Incarcerated at San Quentin State Prison
- Conviction: October 22, 2014 (El Dorado County Superior Court, California)
- Criminal charge: First-degree murder (with deadly weapon enhancement)
- Penalty: 26 years to life in state prison; parole eligible June 2031

Details
- Weapon: scissors

Todd Carl Winkler (born ca. 1967) is an American man convicted of first-degree murder for fatally stabbing his third wife, Rachel Winkler in 2012. The case drew national attention due to its brutality, Winkler's history of mental illness, and a prior suspicious death of his second wife. In 2014, he was found guilty sentenced to 26 years to life for killing Rachel. As of 2022, Todd is imprisoned at San Quentin, with parole eligibility around mid-2031.

== Early life and education ==
Todd Carl Winkler was born around 1967 and grew up on a farm in rural Iowa. He was valedictorian of his high school class and served as student body president.

After high school, Winkler was accepted into the United States Air Force Academy in 1990, where he trained as a pilot. After graduating, he served in Japan as an F-16 fighter pilot with the 14th Fighter Squadron, known as the “Fighting Samurai".

Winkler was hospitalized for psychiatric evaluation twice, once in Japan and again in Amsterdam while employed at Abbott Laboratories. His mental health history became part of his defense in the murder trial. Winkler eventually left the U.S. Air Force with a 50% disability rating, linked to his mental health conditions.

Todd Winkler married Rachel Hatfield in 2005 after a short courtship. The couple initially seemed to establish a stable family life in the upscale community of Cameron Park, California. They had three children: Alex, Ariel, and Eva, who were between infancy and about seven years old by early 2012. Rachel managed operations at the Cameron Park airport, while Todd was a pharmaceutical company executive.

By June 2010, Rachel began an affair with James White, a former Marine and sheriff's deputy who worked as a handyman at the airport. Rachel expressed dissatisfaction with her marriage, including Todd's financial stress and erratic behavior. As Rachel finalized divorce proceedings in February 2012, marital tension escalated, likely leading to the events days later.

=== Previous marriages ===
Before marrying Rachel Hatfield in 2005, Winkler had two prior wives. His second wife, Catherine “Cathy” Winkler, died in a 1999 car crash while they lived in Georgia. Todd said the auto crash happened when Cathy crashed the car while driving him to the hospital after he suffered an allergic reaction to an insect bite. Some found his story suspicious as Todd never showed the alleged bite to investigators.

== Murder of Rachel Winkler ==
Rachel told friends and family she planned to divorce Todd and seek full custody of their children, and move in with her new boyfriend James White. Rachel expressed fears for her safety, noting Todd's increasing control, emotional instability, and financial unreliability. Rachel's father and close friends said she believed Todd had staged past accidents and manipulated her psychologically. She had uncovered suspicious details about his past, including the 1999 death of his second wife in a questionable car fire. In the days before her death, Rachel began divorce proceedings and explored legal options for separation and custody.

On February 27, 2012, a violent domestic homicide took place in the upscale aviation community of Cameron Park, California, where Todd and Rachel Winkler lived with their three young children. That morning, emergency responders were called to the Winkler home after a neighbor dialed 911 in response to screaming voices from the Winkler residence. Upon arrival, authorities found Rachel Winkler, 37, dead inside the house with multiple stab wounds and evidence of a struggle.

The attack occurred in the nursery, near the couple's infant child, which surprised investigators. The weapon, a pair of scissors, was used with such force that one blade broke off and lodged in her skull, penetrating her head and neck. Blood patterns and damaged furniture indicated what police believed as a frenzied, prolonged assault, with Rachel sustaining numerous defensive wounds, suggesting she tried to protect herself.

Todd Winkler, then 44, was found at the scene with minor injuries to his hand and neck. He claimed he killed Rachel in self-defense, alleging she attacked him with the scissors during an argument. He said he took the scissors and used them against her. However, law enforcement and paramedics found his injuries inconsistent with an attack, suspecting they were self-inflicted. Investigators concluded the crime scene contradicted Winkler's account. There was no evidence Rachel held or used the scissors, and most blood evidence pointed to Todd as the aggressor. Police investigation indicated the high level of violence, especially the severe neck wound and embedded blade, suggested rage or intentional harm rather than spontaneous self-defense, with the attack being focused and sustained.

== Trial and sentencing ==
Todd Winkler was formally charged with first-degree murder with a deadly weapon enhancement shortly after the February 2012 killing of his wife, Rachel Winkler. Prosecutors claimed the act was intentional and premeditated, driven by jealousy, rage, and a desire to avoid divorce and losing custody of his three children, rather than being spontaneous or defensive.

The case was handled by the El Dorado County District Attorney's Office, with the trial starting in late 2014. The prosecution presented detailed forensic evidence, and argued her injuries pointed to an execution-style attack rather than self-defense. They also suggested Todd waited for a moment when Rachel was vulnerable to strike.

Winkler's defense claimed he had dissociative identity disorder (DID) and was also in a fugue state during the killing. They cited his past psychiatric hospitalizations during military service and employment at Abbott Laboratories, including suicide attempts and delusional behavior. The jury deliberated several days and returned a guilty verdict for first degree murder on October 22, 2014.

Judge Daniel Proud sentenced Winkler to 26 years to life for the murder, plus one year for the deadly weapon enhancement involving the scissors. Winkler was moved to San Quentin State Prison, where he remains. California Department of Corrections records indicate he will be eligible for parole in June 2031.

== Media coverage ==
The case has been featured in multiple true crime programs, including NBC's Dateline, and Accident, Suicide or Murder on the Oxygen network.
