= Constantin von Monakow =

Russian-Swiss neuropathologist

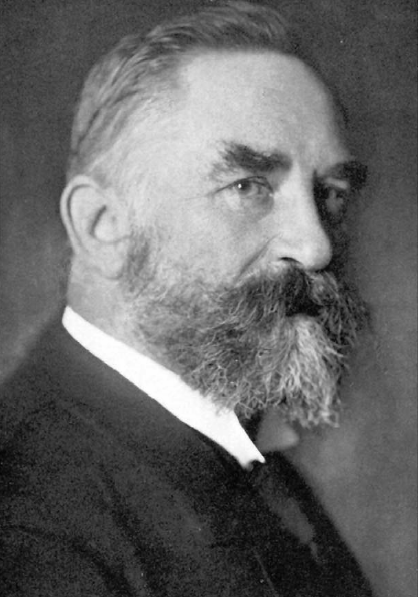
Constantin von Monakow

Constantin von Monakow (4 November 1853 – 19 October 1930) was a Russian-Swiss neuropathologist who was a native of Bobretsovo in the Vologda Governorate.

He studied at the University of Zurich while working as an assistant at the Burghölzli Institute under the directorship of Eduard Hitzig (1839-1907). After graduation, he was an assistant at St. Pirminsberg, where he performed scientific investigations of cerebral anatomy. In 1885 he returned to Zurich, where he later became director of the brain anatomy institute. In 1917 he founded the journal Schweizer Archiv für Neurologie und Psychiatrie (Swiss Archives of Neurology and Psychiatry), and was its editor-in-chief until his death. He died in Zurich in 1930.

== Neuropathological research ==
Monakow made numerous contributions in his analysis of the sensory and motor pathways of the brain. He was interested in the functional relationships amongst the different regions of the brain, and conceptualized that in faculties such as intellect, coordination was needed among its many diverse parts. From his brain research, he introduced the terms "chronogenic localization" and "diaschisis".

In 1910 Monakow coined the term "diaschisis" to describe how an injury to the brain can create behavioral deficiencies that may be followed by eventual recovery. The word is derived from Greek, meaning "shocked throughout". He believed the brain to exist as a delicate balance between its different components, and if a component became disturbed through injury it could affect other parts of the brain not seemingly associated with the site of injury. Therefore, if the damage wasn't too severe, functional behaviour would recover once the period of diaschisis wore off.

His name is lent to "Monakow's nucleus" (lateral cuneate nucleus) and to the "bundle of Monakow" (rubrospinal fasciculus). In addition, "Monakow's syndrome" bears his name, defined as contralateral hemiplegia, hemianaesthesia and homonomous hemianopsia due to occlusion of the anterior choroidal artery.

He was responsible for identifying the arcuate fasciculus as the fibre tract that connected the Broca's and Wernicke's speech areas. This anatomical link (which is now questioned) “soon became a dogma in neurology and still today provides the backbone of anatomical models of language.”

He is mentioned in Anti Oedipus, the first volume of Deleuze and Guattari's Capitalism and Schizophrenia, because of his work with Mourgue which they claim posits 'the introduction of desire into neurology.'

== Selected writings ==
- Beitrag zur Localisation von Hirnrindentumoren, (Thesis/dissertation) (1881) – On localization of cerebral cortex tumors.
- Pathologie du cerveau, in German as Gehirnpathologie (1897) – Brain pathology.
- Über Lokalisation der Hirnfunktion (1910) – On localization of brain function.
- La localisation de l'encéphale et la dégradation fonctionelle par des lésions circonscrites du cortex cérébral, in German as Die Lokalisation im Grosshirn und Abbau der Funktion durch kortikale Herde (1914) – Localization in the cortex and the reduction of cortical function.
- Gefuhl, Gesittung und Gehirn, (1916); translated and published in English as "The emotions, morality and the brain"; Washington, Nervous and Mental Disease Pub. Co., 1925.
- Psychiatrie und Biologie, (1919) – Psychology and biology.
- Schizophrenie und Plexus chorioidei (with Kitabayashi), (1919) - Schizophrenia and the choroid plexus.
