= Glasgow Outcome Scale =

Scale measuring brain injury recovery

- Purpose: Characterizes brain injury into recovery outcome categories

The Glasgow Outcome Scale (GOS) is an interview-based method used since the 1970s to assess a patient's level of recovery from brain injury. It considers several factors such as a patient's ability to communicate, to function independently in activities of daily living (ADLs), and ability to return to work or school. The basic scale has five broad categories: death, vegetative state, severe disability, moderate disability, or good recovery; an extended version (GOSE) of the original scale includes three sub-categories for a total of eight possible outcomes. Both versions of the scale have been widely adopted in clinical practice, as well as in research studies on brain injury.

== History ==
The Glasgow Outcome Scale was first described by Bryan Jennett and Michael Bond in 1975 as a tool to characterize both survival and quality of life after brain injury. Soon after its publication, it was used in several different large clinical studies of brain injury throughout the 1970s and early 1980s. In 1981, Jennett and his colleagues expanded the 5-point original GOS by subdividing some of the original categories, resulting in the 8-point Extended Glasgow Outcome Scale (GOSE).

Throughout the 1980s and 1990s, studies assessing the reliability of both the original and extended version of the GOS found that there was significant inter-rater variation in how patients were ranked on the scales based on the differences in background of the assessor. To address this and achieve greater consistency among different assessors, a structured interview format with clearer guidelines was developed in 1998 for both the GOS and GOSE.

The GOSE-Pediatric Revision (GOSE-Peds), introduced in 2012, is the latest development of the GOS. It uses the same 8 outcome categories as the GOSE, but modifies aspects of the structured interview to consider age and developmental differences.

== Aims ==
The Glasgow Outcome Scale aims to characterize the overall functional outcome and quality of life in patients after sustaining brain injury. Thus, the scale reflects disability and limitations in major areas of life instead of focusing on specific impairments.

The assessment is conducted in interview format, assessing a patient's level of communication, responsiveness, independence in activities of daily living (ADLs), independence outside the home, ability to work, ability to participate in social or leisure activities, and extent of adverse impact on relationships with others. The Extended Glasgow Outcome Scale further includes assessment of other problems caused by or related to the initial injury, such as headaches, migraines, fatigue, or memory difficulty.

The Glasgow Outcome Scale and Extended Glasgow Outcome Scale are intended for use after discharge from hospital. A derivative of the GOSE, the Glasgow Outcome at Discharge Scale (GODS), was developed in 2013 for use in the inpatient setting.

== Scoring ==
The GOS and GOSE is carried out as standardized interview assessment. In some cases, the assessor may need to obtain collateral information from a family member or close friend of the patient if the patient is unable to participate or respond reliably. Multiple sources of information can be combined to determine the final overall scoring. After the interview assessment is complete, the assessor categorizes the responses into one of the possible outcome categories outlined by the scale.

=== Glasgow Outcome Scale ===
The original Glasgow outcome scale outlined five possible outcome categories: death, persistent vegetative state, severe disability, moderate disability and good recovery.

1. Death	Death
2. Persistent Vegetative State	Prolonged state of unresponsiveness with absence of awareness of self or environment
3. Severe Disability	Severe disability with permanent need for assistance with activities of daily living (ADLs)
4. Moderate Disability	Independent with ADLs at home but may require some assistance outside of the home
5. Good Recovery	Fully recovery or minor disability with resumption of normal life

=== Extended Glasgow Outcome Scale ===
The Extended Glasgow Outcome Scale (GOSE) subdivided the three upper categories of the original GOS. This resulted in eight total outcome categories: death, persistent vegetative state, lower severe disability, upper severe disability, lower moderate disability, upper moderate disability, lower good recovery, and upper good recovery.

1. Death	Death
2. Persistent Vegetative State	Prolonged state of unresponsiveness with absence of awareness of self or environment
3. Lower Severe Disability	Requires full assistance with ADLs
4. Upper Severe Disability	Requires some assistance with ADLs
5. Lower Moderate Disability	Independent with ADLs but cannot resume work, school, or all of previous social activities
6. Upper Moderate Disability	Independent with ADLs and able to resume some work, school, or previous activities
7. Lower Good Recovery	Able to resume normal activities with some injury-related problems
8. Upper Good Recovery	Full recovery with no current problems related to the injury

=== Pediatric Scoring: the Glasgow Outcome Scale-Pediatric Revision ===
The Glasgow Outcome Scale-Pediatric Revision (GOSE-P) adjusts the interview questions to account for age and developmental differences in pediatric patients. It uses the same eight outcome categories as the GOSE.

== Applications and uses ==
The Glasgow Outcome Scale is widely used in clinical settings to evaluate patients who have suffered brain injury. It is the recommended outcomes measure for major trauma and head injury by many national-level organizations, including the NIH National Institute of Child Health and Human Development, and the National Institute of Neurological Disorders and Stroke.

The Glasgow Outcome Scale has also been extensively used in research and clinical trials. In a 2016 review on the management of traumatic brain injury that examined over 160 randomized controlled trials published between 1980 and 2015, the GOS or GOSE was the outcome measurement reported in over two-thirds of the trials.

== Challenges and limitations ==
=== Adoption ===
While the GOS is a widely used outcomes measure for assessing patients with brain injury, many other neurological outcome scales exist, including the Modified Rankin Scale, the Cerebral Performance Category Scale, and Functional Status Examination.

=== Sensitivity and reliability ===
Both the original GOS and the GOSE were found to have significant inter-rater variability shortly after they were introduced. This resulted in the development of a structured interview format with detailed guidelines to improve reliability and consistency between different raters. Shortly after the development of the structured interview guidelines, it was reported that use of this format greatly improved the reliability of both the GOS and GOSE. However, some critics still voice concerns over these figures, and report that inter-rater variability remains high when used by untrained assessors.

=== Limited scope ===
One criticism of the GOS is that it does not account for the patient's perspective of the injury and satisfaction with life after the injury. The GOS may not measure specific aspects of recovery or quality of life that are important to patients and families. It does not directly assess for patient satisfaction or the emotional aspects associated with the injury or recovery.

== See also ==
- Barthel scale
- Disability Rating Scale
