= Alexander Winkler =

Alexander Winkler may refer to:

- Alexander Winkler (footballer) (born 1992), German footballer
- Alexander Winkler (composer) (1865–1935), Russian pianist, composer and music educator
- Alexander Winkler (politician), American representative in Colorado
