= Gerhard Winkler =

Gerhard Winkler may refer to:

- Gerhard Winkler (biathlete) (born 1951), German former biathlete
- Gerhard Winkler (composer) (1906–1977), German songwriter
- Geri Winkler (born 1956), Austrian mountaineer
