= Harry Winkler =

Harry Winkler may refer to:

- Harry Winkler (handballer) (born 1945), American Olympic handballer
- Harry Winkler (writer) (1915–1981), American sitcom writer

== See also ==
- Henry Winkler (disambiguation)
- Harold Winkler (disambiguation)
