= Matthew Winkler =

Matthew Winkler may refer to:

- Matthew Winkler (journalist) (born 1955), an American journalist who is a co-founder and editor-in-chief of Bloomberg News
- Matthew Winkler (minister) (1974–2006), a minister who was the victim in a high-profile murder case in 2006
