= Impairment rating =

Disability severity classification

An impairment rating is a percentage intended to represent the degree of person's permanent physical or mental impairment. For people who have had an accident or an illness that has resulted in long term or permanent reduction in the use of a part of their body or bodily function, the impairment rating can be used to measure the loss. Impairment is defined as a deviation away from one's normal health status and functionality. Impairment specifically describes the deviation in a stable condition where, even with further treatment, the impact on the individual's activities of daily living is unlikely to change. Cases which have reached a state where an impairment rating can be determined are said to have reach Maximum medical improvement or MMI. Impairment is distinct from disability. An individual's impairment rating is based on the direct restrictive impact of an impairment, whereas disability includes the indirect consequences one's impairment. despite these differences impairment rating is commonly used by government organizations as a measure of disability, or to determine compensation owed due to an accident or injury. Using medical evidence and expert consensus in the field improves the fairness and consistency in an impairment rating.

The AMA guidelines attempt to standardize impairment rating by basing them off of objective measurements such as Decibel Sum Hearing Loss (DSHL) or visual acuity tests. Despite these attempts, impairment ratings given to an individual by different medical examiners are sometimes problematically inconsistent with each other.

== See also ==
- Accessibility
- Disability abuse
- Disability discrimination act
- Disability studies
- List of disability rights organizations
- List of physically disabled politicians
- Orthopedics
- Workers' compensation
