= Gustav Winckler (disambiguation) =

Gustav Winckler (1925–1979) was a Danish singer and composer.

Gustav Winckler may also refer to:

- Gustav Winckler (jurist) (1897–1980), German jurist
- Gustav Winkler (1867–1954), German industrialist
