= Malcolm Winkler =

American biologist

Malcolm Winkler is an American biologist currently at Indiana University, Bloomington and an Elected Fellow of the American Association for the Advancement of Science. His work has been important on Streptococcus pneumoniae in studying cell structure, metabolism, pathogenesis and stress responses mediated by regulatory mechanisms, signal transduction and supramolecular complexes. His research has been driven by advanced molecular genetics, cell biology, physiology, tissue culture and biochemistry, leading his papers to be highly cited in consecutive years with highs of 719, 369 and 292.
