= Josef Winkler =

Josef Winkler may refer to:

- Josef Winkler (writer) (born 1953), Austrian writer
- Josef Winkler (politician) (born 1974), German politician

== See also ==
- Josef Winckler (1881–1966), German author
