= Barthel scale =

Ordinal scale used to measure performance in activities of daily living (ADL)

- Synonyms: Barthel ADL index
- Purpose: measure performance in activities of daily living

The Barthel scale is an ordinal scale used to measure performance in activities of daily living (ADL). Each performance item is rated on this scale with a given number of points assigned to each level or ranking. It uses ten variables describing ADL and mobility. A higher number is associated with a greater likelihood of being able to live at home with a degree of independence following discharge from a hospital. The amount of time and physical assistance required to perform each item are used in determining the assigned value of each item. External factors within the environment affect the score of each item. If adaptations outside the standard home environment are met during assessment, the participant's score will be lower if these conditions are not available. If adaptations to the environment are made, they should be described in detail and attached to the Barthel index.

The scale was introduced in 1965, and yielded a score of 0–100 (Mahoney, F.I. & Barthel, D.W., 1965. Functional Evaluation: The Barthel Index. Maryland state medical journal, 14, pp. 61–65.). Collin et al. (1988) argued that the original scoring system gave an exaggerated impression of accuracy and subsequently proposed a modification where each domain was scored in one-point increments with a full score of 20 indicating functional independence (Collin, C. et al., 1988. The Barthel ADL Index: a reliability study. International disability studies, 10(2), pp. 61–63.). The sensitized version sharply discriminates between good and better and poor and poorer performances. Its effectiveness is not just with in-patient rehabilitation but home care, nursing care, skilled nursing, and community. The Barthel index signifies one of the first contributions to the functional status literature and it represents occupational therapists' lengthy period of inclusion of functional mobility and ADL measurement within their scope of practice. The scale is regarded as reliable, although its use in clinical trials in stroke medicine is inconsistent. It has however, been used extensively to monitor functional changes in individuals receiving in-patient rehabilitation, mainly in predicting the functional outcomes related to stroke. The Barthel index has been shown to have portability and has been used in 16 major diagnostic conditions as well as different clinical settings (e.g., nursing homes) with satisfactory reliability and validity. The Barthel index has demonstrated high inter-rater reliability (0.95) and test–retest reliability (0.89) as well as high correlations (0.74–0.8) with other measures of physical disability.

Copyright Information: The Maryland State Medical Society holds the copyright for the Barthel Index. It may be used freely for noncommercial purposes with the following citation: Mahoney FI, Barthel D. "Functional evaluation: the Barthel Index." Maryland State Med Journal 1965;14:56-61. Used with permission. Permission is required to modify the Barthel Index or to use it for commercial purposes.

== Variables ==
The ten variables addressed in the Barthel scale are:

- Presence or absence of fecal incontinence
- Presence or absence of urinary incontinence
- Help needed with grooming
- Help needed with toilet use
- Help needed with feeding
- Help needed with transfers (e.g. from chair to bed)
- Help needed with walking
- Help needed with dressing
- Help needed with climbing stairs
- Help needed with bathing

== See also ==
- Modified Rankin Scale
