= John E. Winkler =

John E. Winkler (1941–2007) was an author of and photographer for books, articles and calendars that typically featured his unique off-trail location representations of the Adirondack and Shawangunk Mountains of New York State. He was the only "46er" to have bushwhacked (hiked without using the trail) all 46 of the Adirondack high peaks.

== Publications: Books ==
John's books are often referred to as "coffee table books" since this book format features the larger page size than the typical standard reading books and are usually displayed on coffee tables for decoration, light reading or as a conversation starter.

A Bushwhacker's View of the Adirondacks. John E. Winkler and Neal S. Burdick. book. Published June 1, 1995. Publisher: North Country Books. 128 Pages. This book contains photos taken in the High Peaks region of the Adirondack wilderness during all season of 30 years of trips; chapters feature views of "Mountain Vistas", "Lakes and Ponds", "Rock Slides" and others. Also included are poems by C. W. Uschman, pen and ink sketches by M. Whelan and the illustrator John Wiley.

A Cherished Wilderness the Adirondacks. John E. Winkler. 1998. Northcountry Books. This book features more unique vistas of the Adirondacks with a more photos from the less traveled regions outside of the High Peaks. Other regions include the Three Ponds / Silver Lake Wilderness Area, Hudson River Gorge, Moose River Plains, Indian Lake area, regions north west of Saranac Lake, Whitney landholdings and Piseco Lake region and more. From spectacular frozen waterfalls to bright fall colors this book has all seasons. Also features more poems by C. W. Uschman and sketches by John Wiley and M. Whelan. This book proved to be the most popular of all and sold out within 5 years.

An Enchanted Land the Shawangunk Mountains. John E. Winkler. 2003. Northcountry Books. Photos from the 2000+ ft ridge south of the Catskill Mountains. The unique geography of the Shawangunks or "Gunks" includes white quartz cliffs, glacial lakes, and dry highlands. Photos include some of the micro-environments surrounding streams, swamps, lakes, and the highlands near Sam's Point. Winkler bushwhacked through many un-trailed blocks of thick woods to get rare photos of native plants animals and geographic features. The book has short passages on the history of the area from the wealthy who stayed at the Mohonk House to the now gone communities of gypsy berry pickers. Contemporary issues in the book include rock climbing and the destruction of the Southwestern sections of the ridge by developers. The book has many photos of the unique formation called the "Ice Caves" which at the time of most photos was a trail-less area. Some trips were done with local Gunks author historian Mark Fried.

== Technique ==
John Winkler is among several popular Adirondack photographers of his time including Nathan Farb and Carl Heilman II. Winkler's books were different in that he focused on photos from off trail locations, mostly remote rocky outcrops, rock slides, streambeds, lakes and swamps. He carried a Canon SLR camera with 35 mm color slide film. Other popular photographers like Nathan Farb were known for carrying large format cameras that weighed a lot and inhibited distant travel. Winkler traveled light since much of the terrain he traveled in was extremely thick or steep. Traveling in high altitude spruce forests requires "swimming" through tangled stiff branches and a compass for navigation. John Winkler was a master of the map and compass, and integrated direct observation of the visible terrain to solve navigation problems. Doing 35 mm photography worked the best in sub-zero temperatures, cloud soaked forests, and steep wooded slopes. John used Sherpa Snowclaw snowshoes. He did not rock or ice climb but often navigated class 4 slopes in all seasons. He used the GPS briefly in the late 90s but eventually chose to move back to the magnetic compass.

== Other publications ==
Winkler's photos were featured in numerous calendars. Other photos were published in articles for 46er Magazine, Adirondack Life and Adirondac Magazine. He wrote some articles for magazines as well.

== Background ==
John E. Winkler was born in traditional German-Lutheran family of Pennsylvania. He worked 25 years for Benchmark Printing in Schenectady, New York. He was an active member of the Schenectady Chapter of the Adirondack Mountain Club. Through the club he met others with similar interest and became an excursion leader on the weekends. John hiked almost every weekend from the late 1970s until the 2000s. He retired at the earliest possible date in order to be able to hike during the week and he maintained a cleaning service job during the evening. He was an avid historic license plate collector.

== Affiliations ==
Adirondack Mountain Club (ADK), Adirondack 46ers, Bashakill Preservation Society, Mohunk Preserve, Automobile license Plate Collection Association of Schenectady
