= Diaschisis =

Diaschisis (from Greek διάσχισις meaning "shocked throughout") is a sudden change of function in a portion of the brain connected to a distant, but damaged, brain area. The site of the originally damaged area and of the diaschisis are connected to each other by neurons. The loss of the damaged structure disrupts the function of the remaining intact systems and causes a physiological imbalance. This can lead both to restitution as well as disruption of distal brain areas. The injury is produced by an acute focal disturbance in an area of the brain, from traumatic brain injury or stroke, for example. Regarding dysfunctional diaschisis, some function may be restored with gradual readjustment of the intact but suppressed areas through intervention and the brain's natural neuroplasticity.

== History ==
The term diaschisis was coined by Constantin von Monakow in 1914. Von Monakow's concept of neurophysical changes in distant brain tissue to the focal lesion led to a widespread clinical interest. Doctors were interested in how diaschisis could describe the signs and symptoms of brain lesions that could not be explained.

== Mechanism ==
The areas of the brain are connected by vast organized neuronal pathways that allow one area of the brain to influence other areas more distal to it. Understanding these dense pathways helps to link a lesion causing brain damage in one area of the brain to degeneration in a more distal brain area. A focal lesion causes damage that also disturbs the structural and functional connectivity to the brain areas distal to the lesion.

The primary mechanism of diaschisis is functional deafferentation, which is the loss of the input of information from the part of the brain that is now damaged. The decrease in information and neural firing to the distal brain area causes those synaptic connections to weaken and initiates a change in the structural and functional connectivity around that area. This leads to diaschisis. Diaschisis is also influenced by many other factors, including stroke, brain swelling, and neuroanatomical disconnection. The severity of these factors is manifested in altered neuronal excitability, hypo-metabolism, and hypo perfusion.

Currently the term diaschisis has a more positive connotation, describing the period of rapid recovery of function immediately following brain insult. Diaschisis is an especially important recovery factor in children with insults, as child brains are more susceptible to neurodegenerative processes. This is due to differences in myelination and water content, which allow a diffuse transmission of traumatic forces.

== Classification ==
=== Classification by extent of the effect (focal/non focal) ===
There are two types of diaschisis. The first is focal diaschisis, which refers to the remote neurophysiological changes that are caused by a focal lesion based on von Monakow's definition. The second type of diaschisis is non-focal diaschisis and it focuses on the changes in the strength and direction of neural pathways and connectivity between brain areas. This type of diaschisis has only been a topic in recent studies as a result of the advancement of brain imaging tools and technology. These new tools allow for better understanding of the organization of the brain connectivity and further investigation into new types of diaschisis, like non-focal or connectional diaschisis. This new type of diaschisis relates much more closely to clinical findings.

=== Classification by anatomical lesion ===
Diaschisis may be classified based on the specific neural pathways disrupted by the primary lesion. These subtypes correspond to distinct patterns of brain connectivity.

==== Crossed cerebellar diaschisis ====
Crossed cerebellar diaschisis is defined by reduced metabolism and blood flow in the cerebellar hemisphere contralateral to a supratentorial cerebral lesion, most commonly observed following an ischemic stroke.

Mechanism

This phenomenon results from interruption of the corticopontocerebellar pathway, which connects the cerebral cortex to the contralateral cerebellum. Damage to supratentorial cortical areas reduces excitatory input to the cerebellum, leading to functional suppression of neuronal activity in the affected hemisphere. In summary, damage to supratentorial cortical areas leads to reduced excitatory input and subsequent functional deactivation of the contralateral cerebellar hemisphere.

Crossed cerebellar diaschisis is identified using functional imaging techniques such as positron emission tomography (PET) and single-photon emission computed tomography (SPECT), which reveal decreased cerebellar perfusion despite no direct structural injury.

==== Thalamic diaschisis ====
Thalamic diaschisis, also known as ipsilateral thalamic diaschisis (ITD), is marked by decreased thalamic function, metabolism, and perfusion secondary to a distant cerebral lesion in the same hemisphere. This phenomenon typically occurs following a supratentorial ischemic stroke that does not directly involve the thalamus.

Mechanism

This subtype results from disruption of corticothalamic connections that link the thalamus to cortical and subcortical structures. Injury to those interconnected regions leads to functional deafferentation of the thalamus. The resulting decrease in neuronal activity contributes to reduced metabolic demand and cerebral blood flow. Secondary functional depression of the thalamus can be detected using functional neuroimaging techniques such as computed tomography (CT) perfusion, positron emission tomography (PET), or magnetic resonance imaging (MRI), even in the absence of a primary thalamic lesion.

==== Transhemispheric diaschisis ====
Transhemispheric diaschisis refers to reduced neuronal activity in cortical regions of one hemisphere following a lesion in the opposite hemisphere, without direct structural damage to the affected site.

Mechanism

This phenomenon is associated with disruption of interhemispheric connections, particularly through commissural pathways such as the corpus callosum. Damage to one hemisphere reduces excitatory signaling to homologous regions in the contralateral hemisphere.

Unlike other forms of diaschisis, this subtype specifically reflects alterations in interhemispheric communication and highlights the importance of bilateral cortical integration. Functional imaging studies show decreased metabolism or perfusion in the unaffected hemisphere.

==== Comparison table ====
| Type | Pathway | Location affected |
|---|---|---|
| CCD | Corticopontocerrebellar | Contralateral cerebellum |
| Thalamic | Corticothalamic | Ipsilateral thalamus |
| Transhemispheric | Commissural pathways (corpus callosum) | Contralateral cortex |
