= Maximum medical improvement =

Plateau in a person's healing process

Maximum Medical Improvement (MMI) occurs when an injured person reaches a state where their condition cannot be improved further or their healing process reaches a treatment plateau. It can mean that the patient has fully recovered from the injury or their medical condition has stabilized to the point that no major medical or emotional change can be expected in the person's condition. At that point, no further healing or improvement is deemed possible and this occurs despite continuing medical treatment or rehabilitative programs the injured person partakes in.

MMI is relevant in multiple contexts, including personal injury cases and workers' compensation cases. When a worker receiving Workers' Compensation benefits reaches maximum medical improvement, their condition is assessed and a degree of permanent or partial impairment is determined. This degree will impact the amount of benefits the worker is able to receive.

MMI means that treatment options have been exhausted. Temporary disability payments are terminated and a settlement is agreed regarding the condition of the worker at this point.
