= Leibniz Prize =

German research award

Gottfried Wilhelm Leibniz Prize Förderpreis für deutsche Wissenschaftler im Gottfried Wilhelm Leibniz-Programm der Deutschen Forschungsgemeinschaft
- Awarded for: Exceptional scientists and academics for their outstanding achievements in the field of research
- Location: Berlin, Germany
- Presented by: German Research Foundation
- Reward: up to €2.5 million
- First award: 1986
- Website: dfg.de

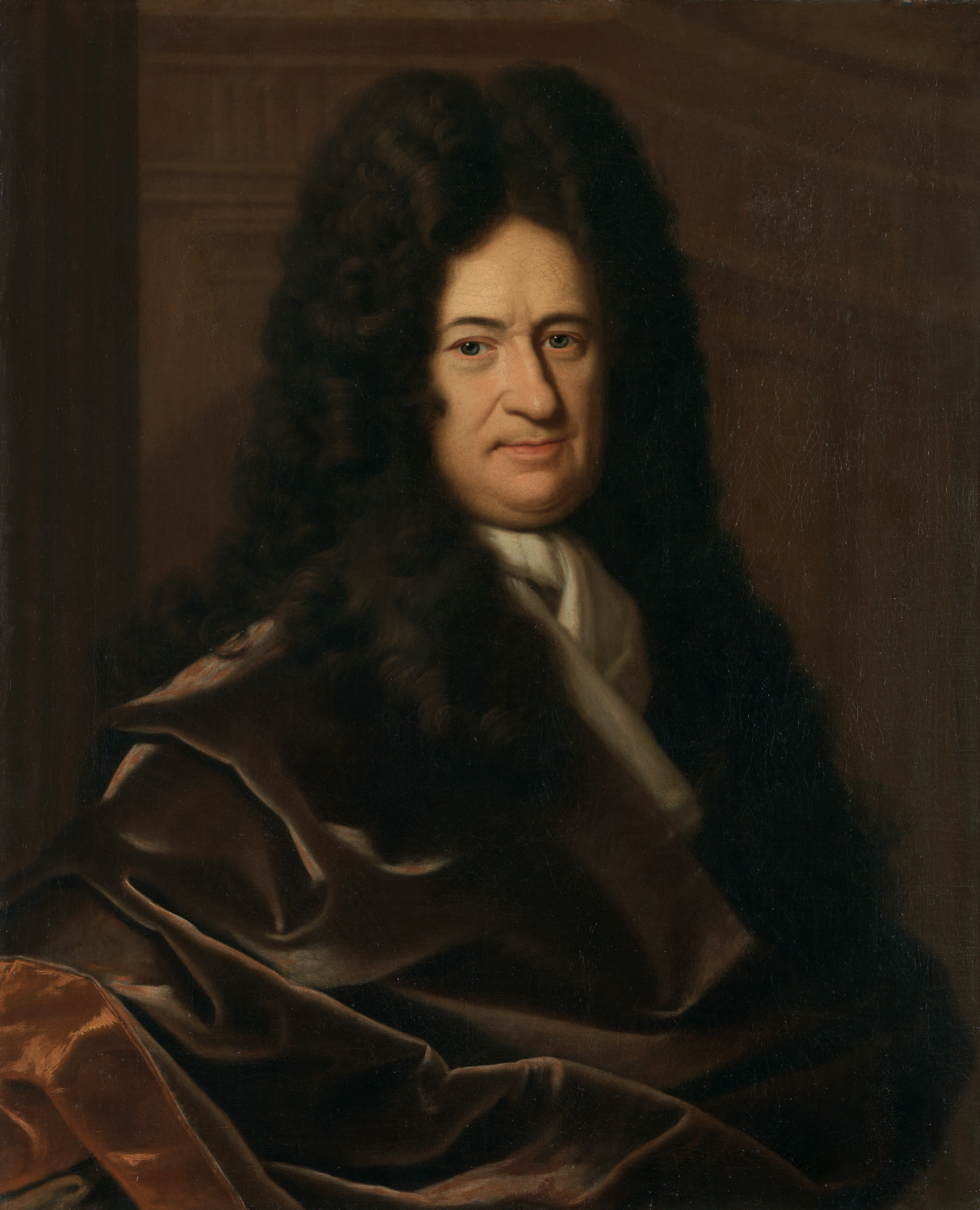
Gottfried Wilhelm Leibniz portrayed by Christoph Bernhard Francke, c. 1695; Herzog Anton Ulrich Museum, Braunschweig

The Gottfried Wilhelm Leibniz Prize (German: Förderpreis für deutsche Wissenschaftler im Gottfried Wilhelm Leibniz-Programm der Deutschen Forschungsgemeinschaft), or Leibniz Prize, is awarded by the German Research Foundation to "exceptional scientists and academics for their outstanding achievements in the field of research". Since 1986, up to ten prizes have been awarded annually to individuals or research groups working at a research institution in Germany or at a German research institution abroad. It is considered the most important research award in Germany.

The prize is named after the German polymath and philosopher Gottfried Wilhelm Leibniz (1646–1716). It is one of the highest endowed research prizes in Germany with a maximum of €2.5 million per award. Past prize winners include Stefan Hell (2008), Gerd Faltings (1996), Peter Gruss (1994), Svante Pääbo (1992), Theodor W. Hänsch (1989), Erwin Neher (1987), Bert Sakmann (1987), Jürgen Habermas (1986), Hartmut Michel (1986), and Christiane Nüsslein-Volhard (1986).

== Prizewinners ==
=== 2020–2029 ===
2026 | 2025 | 2024 | 2023 | 2022 | 2021 | 2020

2026:

- Klaus Blaum – Experimental Physics, Max Planck Institute for Nuclear Physics, Heidelberg
- Christian Doeller – Cognitive Neuroscience and Psychology, Max Planck Institute for Human Cognitive and Brain Sciences, Leipzig
- Christian Hasse – Energy Process Technology, Technische Universität Darmstadt
- Johannes Krause – Archaeogenetics, Max Planck Institute for Evolutionary Anthropology, Leipzig
- Julia Mahamid – Structural Biology, European Molecular Biology Laboratory (EMBL), Heidelberg
- Klaus-Robert Müller – Machine Learning, Technische Universität Berlin
- Frank Pollmann – Theoretical Condensed Matter Physics, Technical University of Munich (TUM)
- Armido Studer – Organic Molecular Chemistry, University of Münster
- Barbara Vetter – Theoretical Philosophy, Free University of Berlin
- Cornelia Zumbusch – Modern German Literature, University of Hamburg

2025:

- Volker Haucke – Biochemistry and Cell Biology, Leibniz Research Institute for Molecular Pharmacology, Berlin
- Hannes Leitgeb – Theoretical Philosophy, LMU Munich
- Bettina Valeska Lotsch – Solid State and Materials Chemistry, Max Planck Institute for Solid State Research, Stuttgart
- Wolfram Pernice – Experimental Physics, Heidelberg University
- Ana Pombo – Genome Biology, Max Delbrück Center for Molecular Medicine, Berlin
- Daniel Rueckert – Artificial Intelligence, Technical University of Munich
- Angkana Rüland – Applied Mathematics, University of Bonn
- Michael Seewald – Catholic Theology, University of Münster
- Maria-Elena Torres-Padilla – Epigenetics, Helmholtz Zentrum München
- Robert Zeiser – Hemato-Oncology, University Medical Center Freiburg

2024:

- Dmitri Efetov – Experimental Solid State Physics, LMU Munich
- Tobias J. Erb – Synthetic Microbiology, Max Planck Institute for Terrestrial Microbiology, Marburg, and Marburg University
- Jonas Grethlein – Classical Philology, Heidelberg University
- Moritz Helmstaedter – Neuroscience, Max Planck Institute for Brain Research, Frankfurt am Main
- Ulrike Herzschuh – Geoecology, Alfred Wegener Institute, Potsdam, and University of Potsdam
- Eike Kiltz – Cryptography, Ruhr University Bochum
- Rohini Kuner – Neuropharmacology, Heidelberg University
- Jörn Leonhard – Modern and Contemporary History, University of Freiburg
- Peter Schreiner – Organic Molecular Chemistry, University of Giessen
- Eva Viehmann – Mathematics, University of Münster

2023:

- Lars T. Angenent – Bioengineering, University of Tübingen
- Claudia Höbartner – Biological Chemistry, University of Würzburg
- Achim Menges – Architecture, University of Stuttgart
- Sarah O'Connor – Natural Product Biosynthesis, Max Planck Institute for Chemical Ecology, Jena
- Stefan Pfister – Paediatric Oncology, Deutsches Krebsforschungszentrum (DKFZ) and Heidelberg University
- Hartmut Rosa – Sociology, University of Jena and University of Erfurt
- Georg Schett – Rheumatology, University of Erlangen–Nuremberg
- Catharina Stroppel – Pure Mathematics, University of Bonn
- Fabian Theis – Bio- and Medical Informatics, Helmholtz Zentrum München and Technical University of Munich (TUM)
- Anita Traninger – Romance Literary Studies, Free University of Berlin

2022:

- Almut Arneth – Ecosystem Research, Karlsruhe Institute of Technology (KIT)
- Marietta Auer – Law, Max Planck Institute for Legal History and Legal Philosophy, Frankfurt am Main
- Iain Couzin – Behavioral Biology, Konstanz
- Eileen Furlong – Functional Genomics, European Molecular Biology Laboratory (EMBL)
- Peter Hommelhoff – Experimental Physics, University of Erlangen–Nuremberg
- Stefanie Dehnen – Inorganic Molecular Chemistry, Marburg University
- Gabriel Martínez-Pinedo – Theoretical Physics, GSI Helmholtz Centre for Heavy Ion Research and Technische Universität Darmstadt
- Mischa Meier – Ancient History, University of Tübingen
- Karen Radner – Ancient Near Eastern Studies, LMU Munich
- Moritz Schularick – Economics, University of Bonn

2021:

- Asifa Akhtar – Epigenetics, Max Planck Institute of Immunobiology and Epigenetics, Freiburg
- Elisabeth André – Computer Science, University of Augsburg
- Giuseppe Caire – Theoretical Communications Engineering, Technische Universität Berlin
- Nico Eisenhauer – Biodiversity Research, Leipzig University
- Veronika Eyring – Earth System Modelling, German Aerospace Center, Oberpfaffenhofen and University of Bremen
- Katerina Harvati – Palaeoanthropology, University of Tübingen and Senckenberg Centre for Human Evolution and Palaeoenvironment, Tübingen
- Steffen Mau – Sociology, Humboldt University of Berlin
- Rolf Müller – Pharmaceutical Biology, Helmholtz Institute for Pharmaceutical Research Saarland (HIPS) and Saarland University
- Jürgen Ruland – Immunology, Rechts der Isar Hospital, Technical University of Munich (TUM)
- Volker Springel – Astrophysics, Max Planck Institute for Astrophysics, Garching bei München

2020:

- Thorsten Bach – Chemistry, Technical University of Munich
- Baptiste Jean Germain Gault – Materials Science, Max Planck Institute for Iron Research
- Johannes Grave – Art History, University of Jena
- Thomas Kaufmann – Evangelical Theology, University of Göttingen
- Andrea Musacchio – Cell Biology, Max Planck Institute for Molecular Physiology
- Thomas Neumann – Computer Science, Technical University of Munich
- Marco Prinz – Neuropathology, University of Freiburg
- Markus Reichstein – Biogeochemistry, Max Planck Institute for Biogeochemistry
- Dagmar Schäfer – History of Science, Max Planck Institute for the History of Science
- Juliane Vogel – Literature, University of Konstanz

=== 2019–2010 ===
2019 | 2018 | 2017 | 2016 | 2015 | 2014 | 2013 | 2012 | 2011 | 2010

2019:

- Sami Haddadin – Robotics, Technical University of Munich
- Rupert Huber – Experimental physics, University of Regensburg
- Andreas Reckwitz – Sociology, European University Viadrina, Frankfurt (Oder)
- Hans-Reimer Rodewald – Immunology, German Cancer Research Center (DKFZ), Heidelberg
- Melina Schuh – Cell biology, Max Planck Institute for Biophysical Chemistry (Karl Friedrich Bonhoeffer Institute), Göttingen
- Brenda Schulman – Biochemistry, Max Planck Institute of Biochemistry (MPIB), Martinsried
- Ayelet Shachar – Law and Political science, Max Planck Institute for the Study of Religious and Ethnic Diversity, Göttingen
- Michèle Tertilt – Economics, University of Mannheim
- Wolfgang Wernsdorfer – experimental Solid-state physics, Karlsruhe Institute of Technology (KIT)
- Matthias Wessling – Chemical reaction engineering, RWTH Aachen University and Leibniz-Institut für Interaktive Materialien (DWI), Aachen

2018:

- Jens Beckert – Sociology, Max Planck Institute for the Study of Societies, Cologne
- Alessandra Buonanno – Gravitational Physics, Max Planck Institute for Gravitational Physics (Albert Einstein Institute), Potsdam
- Nicola Fuchs-Schündeln – Economics, Goethe University Frankfurt
- Veit Hornung – Immunologie, Gene Center Munich, LMU Munich and Eicke Latz, Immunologie, University Hospital Bonn, University of Bonn
- Heike Paul – Amerikanistik, University of Erlangen–Nuremberg
- Erika L. Pearce – Immunologie, Max Planck Institute of Immunobiology and Epigenetics, Freiburg/Breisgau
- Claus Ropers – Experimental Solid-state Physics, University of Göttingen
- Oliver G. Schmidt – Materials Science, Leibniz Institute for Solid State and Materials Research, Dresden and Fakultät für Elektrotechnik und Informationstechnik, Chemnitz University of Technology
- Bernhard Schölkopf – Machine Learning, Max Planck Institute for Intelligent Systems, Tübingen
- László Székelyhidi – Applied Mathematics, Leipzig University

2017:

- Lutz Ackermann – Organic Molecular Chemistry, University of Göttingen
- Beatrice Gründler – Arabistics, Free University of Berlin
- Ralph Hertwig – Cognition Psychology, Max Planck Institute for Education Research
- Karl-Peter Hopfner – Structure Biology, LMU Munich
- Frank Jülicher – Theoretical Biophysics, Max Planck Institute for Physics of Complex Systems
- Lutz Mädler – Mechanical Process engineering, University of Bremen
- Britta Nestler – Material science, Karlsruhe Institute of Technology (KIT)
- Joachim P. Spatz – Biophysics, Max-Planck-Institute for Intelligent Systems and Heidelberg University
- Anne Storch – Africanistics, University of Cologne
- Jörg Vogel – Medical Microbiology, University of Würzburg

2016:

- Frank Bradke – Neuroregeneration, German Center for Neurodegenerative Diseases (DZNE), Bonn
- Emmanuelle Charpentier – Infection Biology, Max Planck Institute for Infection Biology, Berlin
- Daniel Cremers – Computer Vision, Chair of Informatics IX: Image Understanding and Knowledge-Based Systems, Technical University of Munich
- Daniel James Frost – Mineralogy/Experimental Petrology, University of Bayreuth
- Dag Nikolaus Hasse – Philosophy, Institute of Philosophy, University of Würzburg
- Benjamin List – Organic Molecular Chemistry, Department of Homogeneous Catalysis, Max Planck Institute for Coal Research, Mülheim an der Ruhr
- Christoph Möllers – Law, Chair of Public Law and Legal Philosophy, Humboldt University of Berlin
- Marina Rodnina – Biochemistry, Max Planck Institute for Biophysical Chemistry (Karl Friedrich Bonhoeffer Institute), Göttingen
- Bénédicte Savoy – History of Modern Art, Center for Metropolitan Studies, Technische Universität Berlin
- Peter Scholze – Arithmetic Algebraic Geometry, Mathematical Institute, University of Bonn

2015:

- Henry N Chapman – Biological Physics/X-Ray Physics, Deutsches Elektronen-Synchrotron (DESY), Hamburg, and University of Hamburg
- Hendrik Dietz – Biochemistry/Biophysics, Technical University of Munich
- Stefan Grimme – Theoretical Chemistry, University of Bonn
- Christian Hertweck – Biological Chemistry, Leibniz Institute for Natural Product Research and Infection Biology – Hans Knöll Institute (HKI), Jena, and University of Jena
- Friedrich Lenger – Modern and Contemporary History, University of Giessen
- Hartmut Leppin – Ancient History, Goethe University Frankfurt
- Steffen Martus – Modern German Literature, Humboldt University of Berlin
- Tobias Moser – Auditory Sensing/Otolaryngology, University of Göttingen

2014:

- Artemis Alexiadou – Linguistics, University of Stuttgart
- Armin von Bogdandy – Foreign public law and international law, Max Planck Institute for Comparative Public Law and International Law, Heidelberg
- Andreas Dreizler – Combustion research, Technische Universität Darmstadt
- Christof Schulz – Combustion and gas dynamics, University of Duisburg-Essen
- Nicole Dubilier – Marine ecology, Max Planck Institute for Marine Microbiology, Bremen, and University of Bremen
- Leif Kobbelt – Informatics and computer graphics, RWTH Aachen University
- Laurens Molenkamp – Experimental solid-state physics, University of Würzburg
- Brigitte Röder – Biological psychology/neuro-psychology, University of Hamburg
- Irmgard Sinning – Structural biology, Heidelberg University
- Rainer Waser – Nanoelectronics/Materials science, RWTH Aachen University and Peter Grünberg Institute (PGI), Forschungszentrum Jülich
- Lars Zender – Hepatology/oncology, Universitätsklinikum Tübingen

2013:

- Thomas Bauer – Islamic studies, University of Münster
- Ivan Đikić – Biochemistry/cell biology, Goethe University Frankfurt
- Frank Glorius – Molecular chemistry, University of Münster
- Onur Güntürkün – Biological psychology, Ruhr University Bochum
- Peter Hegemann – Biophysics, Humboldt University of Berlin
- Marion Merklein – Metal forming technology/manufacturing engineering, University of Erlangen–Nuremberg
- Roderich Moessner – Max Planck Institute for the Physics of Complex Systems, Dresden, together with Achim Rosch – Theoretical solid-state physics, University of Cologne
- Erika von Mutius – Paediatrics, Allergology, Epidemiology, LMU Klinikum
- Vasilis Ntziachristos – Bio-imaging with optical techniques, Technical University of Munich
- Lutz Raphael – Modern and recent history, University of Trier

2012:

- Michael Brecht – Neurophysiology/cellular neuroscience (Bernstein Zentrum für Computational Neuroscience Berlin and Humboldt University of Berlin)
- Rainer Forst – political philosophy/theory (Goethe University Frankfurt)
- Gunther Hartmann – Clinical pharmacology/natural immunity (University Hospital Bonn)
  Christian Kurts – Immunology/Nephrology (University Hospital Bonn)
- Matthias Mann – Biochemistry (Max Planck Institute of Biochemistry, Martinsried)
- Friederike Pannewick – Islamic studies/literature, theater, history of ideas (Marburg University)
- Nikolaus Rajewsky – System biology (Max Delbrück Center for Molecular Medicine, Berlin)
- Ulf Riebesell – Oceanography (Leibniz-Institut für Meereswissenschaften (IFM-Geomar) at Kiel University)
- Peter Sanders – Theoretical computer science and algorithms (Karlsruhe Institute of Technology, KIT)
- Barbara Wohlmuth – Numerical analysis (Technical University of Munich, TUM)
- Jörg Wrachtrup – Experimental physics (University of Stuttgart)

2011:

- Michael Brecht – Neuroscience (Bernstein Center for Computational Neuroscience Berlin)
- Ulla Bonas – Microbiology / Molecular phytopathology (Martin Luther University Halle-Wittenberg)
- Christian Büchel – Cognitive neuroscience (University Medical Center Hamburg-Eppendorf)
- Anja Feldmann – Computer science / Computer networks / Internet (Technische Universität Berlin, T-Labs)
- Kai-Uwe Hinrichs – Organic geochemistry (University of Bremen)
- Anthony A. Hyman – Cell biology / Microtubuli and cleavage (Max Planck Institute of Molecular Cell Biology and Genetics, Dresden)
- Bernhard Keimer – Experimental solid-state physics (Max Planck Institute for Solid State Research, Stuttgart)
- Franz Pfeiffer – X-ray physics (Technical University of Munich, TUM)
- Joachim Friedrich Quack – Egyptology (Heidelberg University)
- Gabriele Sadowski – Thermodynamics (Technical University of Dortmund)
- Christine Silberhorn – Quantum optics (Paderborn University)

2010:

- Jan Born – Neuroendocrinology / Sleep research (University of Lübeck)
- Peter Fratzl – Biomaterials (Max Planck Institute of Colloids and Interfaces, Potsdam)
- Roman Inderst – Macroeconomics (Goethe University Frankfurt)
- Christoph Klein – Pediatrics / Oncology (Hannover Medical School)
- Ulman Lindenberger – Lifespan psychology (Max Planck Institute for Human Development, Berlin)
- Frank Neese – Theoretical chemistry (University of Bonn)
- Jürgen Osterhammel – Recent and modern history (University of Konstanz)
- Petra Schwille – Biophysics (Dresden University of Technology)
- Stefan Treue – Cognitive Neurosciences (German Primate Center, Göttingen)
- Joachim Weickert – Digital image processing (Saarland University)

=== 2009–2000 ===
2009 | 2008 | 2007 | 2006 | 2005 | 2004 | 2003 | 2002 | 2001 | 2000

2009:

- Antje Boetius – Max Planck Institute for Marine Microbiology, Bremen
- Holger Braunschweig – Inorganic chemistry, University of Würzburg
- Wolfram Burgard – Computer science, University of Freiburg
- Heinrich Detering – University of Göttingen
- Jürgen Eckert – IFW Dresden, and Dresden University of Technology
- Armin Falk – Economist, University of Bonn
- Frank Kirchhoff – University of Ulm
- Jürgen Rödel – Materials scientist, Technische Universität Darmstadt
- Karl Lenhard Rudolph – University of Ulm
- Burkhard Wilking – University of Münster
- Martin R. Zirnbauer – University of Cologne

2008:

- Susanne Albers – theoretical computer science, University of Freiburg
- Martin Beneke – theoretical particle physics, RWTH Aachen University
- Holger Boche – telecommunications engineering and information theory, Technische Universität Berlin
- Martin Carrier philosophy, Bielefeld University
- Elena Conti – structural biology, Max Planck Institute of Biochemistry, Martinsried
- Elisa Izaurralde – cell biology, Max Planck Institute for Developmental Biology, Tübingen
- Holger Fleischer – economic law, University of Bonn
- Stefan W. Hell – biophysics, Max Planck Institute for Biophysical Chemistry, Göttingen
- Klaus Kern – physical solid state chemistry, Max Planck Institute for Solid State Research, Stuttgart
- Wolfgang Lück – algebraic topology, University of Münster;
- Jochen Mannhart – experimental solid state physics, University of Augsburg

2007:

- Jens Claus Brüning – molecular diabetes research, endocrinology (University of Cologne)
- Patrick Bruno – theoretical solid-state physics (Max Planck Institute of Microstructure Physics, Halle/Saale)
- Magdalena Götz – neurology (GSF – Forschungszentrum für Umwelt und Gesundheit and LMU Munich)
- Peter Gumbsch – material science (University of Karlsruhe (TH) and Fraunhofer-Institut für Werkstoffmechanik, Freiburg i. Br. and Halle/Saale)
- Gerald Haug – paleoclimatology (GeoForschungsZentrum Potsdam and University of Potsdam)
- Bernhard Jussen – mediaeval history (Bielefeld University)
- Guinevere Kauffmann – astrophysics (MPI for Astrophysics, Garching)
- Falko Langenhorst – mineralogy and petrology (University of Jena)
- Oliver Primavesi – classical philology (LMU Munich)
- Detlef Weigel – plant biology (MPI for Developmental Biology, Tübingen)

2006:

- Matthias Beller and Peter Wasserscheid – homogeneous catalysis (Leibniz-Institute for Organic Catalysis at the University of Rostock) and chemical processing (University of Erlangen–Nuremberg)
- Patrick Cramer – structural biology (LMU Munich)
- Peter Jonas – neurophysiology (University of Freiburg)
- Ferenc Krausz – quantum optics (LMU Munich and Max Planck Institute for Quantum Optics, Garching)
- Klaus Mezger – geochemistry (University of Münster)
- Thomas Mussweiler – social psychology (University of Cologne)
- Felix Otto – analysis of partial differential equations (University of Bonn)
- Dominik Perler – history of philosophy/theoretical philosophy (Humboldt University of Berlin)
- Gyburg Radke – classical philology and philosophy (Marburg University)
- Marino Zerial – cell biology (Max Planck Institute for Molecular Cell Biology and Genetics, Dresden)

2005:

- Peter Becker – cell biology/biochemistry (LMU Munich)
- Immanuel Bloch – quantum optics (University of Mainz)
- Stefanie Dimmeler – molecular cardiology (Goethe University Frankfurt)
- Jürgen Gauß – theoretical chemistry (University of Mainz)
- Günther Hasinger – astrophysics (Max Planck Institute for Extraterrestrial Physics, Garching)
- Christian Jung – plant breeding (Kiel University)
- Axel Ockenfels – experimental economics (University of Cologne)
- Wolfgang Peukert – mechanical process engineering (University of Erlangen–Nuremberg)
- Barbara Stollberg-Rilinger – History of early modern Europe (University of Münster)
- Andreas Tünnermann – microsystems technology (Fraunhofer Institute for Applied Optics and Precision Engineering, Jena)

2004:

- Frank Allgöwer – control engineering (University of Stuttgart)
- Gabriele Brandstetter – theatre science (Free University of Berlin)
- Thomas Carell – organic chemistry (LMU Munich)
- Karl Christoph Klauer – social and cognitive psychology (University of Bonn)
- Hannah Monyer – neurobiology (Heidelberg University)
- Nikolaus Pfanner and Jürgen Soll – biochemistry/molecular cell biology of plants (University of Freiburg and LMU Munich)
- Klaus Dieter Pfeffer – immunology (Heinrich Heine University Düsseldorf)
- Dierk Raabe – material science (Max Planck Institute for Iron Research GmbH, Düsseldorf)
- Konrad Samwer – solid state physics (University of Göttingen)
- Manfred Strecker – structural geology (University of Potsdam)

2003:

- Winfried Denk – medical optics (Max Planck Institute for Medical Research, Heidelberg)
- Hélène Esnault and Eckart Viehweg – algebraic geometry (University of Duisburg-Essen)
- Gerhard Huisken – geometrical analysis (Max Planck Institute for Gravitational Physics (Albert Einstein Institute), Golm, Potsdam)
- Rupert Klein – computational fluid dynamics (Free University of Berlin and Potsdam Institute for Climate Impact Research)
- Albrecht Koschorke – Renaissance and modern German literature (University of Konstanz)
- Roland Lill – cell biology/biochemistry (Marburg University)
- Christof Niehrs – molecular development biology (Deutsches Krebsforschungszentrum, Heidelberg)
- Ferdi Schüth – inorganic chemistry (Max Planck Institute für Kohlenforschung (Coal Research) (incorporated foundation), Mülheim/Ruhr)
- Hans-Peter Seidel – graphics (Max Planck Institute for Informatics, Saarbrücken)
- Hubert Wolf – history of Christianity/Catholic theology (University of Münster)

2002:

- Carmen Birchmeier-Kohler – molecular biology (Max Delbrück Center for Molecular Medicine, Berlin-Buch)
- Wolfgang Dahmen – mathematics (RWTH Aachen University)
- Wolf-Christian Dullo – paleontology (Kiel University)
- Bruno Eckhardt – theoretical physics (Marburg University)
- Michael Famulok – biochemistry (University of Bonn)
- Christian Haass – pathological biochemistry (LMU Munich)
- Franz-Ulrich Hartl – cell biology (Max Planck Institute for Biochemistry, Martinsried)
- Thomas Hengartner – cultural anthropology (University of Hamburg)
- Reinhold Kliegl – general psychology (University of Potsdam)
- Wolfgang Kowalsky – optoelectronics (Technische Universität Braunschweig)
- Karl Leo – solid state physics (Dresden University of Technology)
- Frank Vollertsen – forming and stretching manufacturing engineering (Paderborn University)

2001:

- Jochen Feldmann – optoelectronical component (LMU Munich)
- Eduard Christian Hurt – molecular biology (Heidelberg University)
- Hans Keppler – mineralogy (University of Tübingen)
- Arthur Konnerth – neurophysiology (LMU Munich)
- Ulrich Konrad – musicology (University of Würzburg)
- Martin Krönke – immunology/cell biology (University of Cologne)
- Joachim Küpper – Romantic literary theory (Free University of Berlin)
- Christoph Markschies – history of Christianity (Heidelberg University)
- Wolfgang Marquardt – process systems engineering (RWTH Aachen University)
- Helge Ritter – informatics (Bielefeld University)
- Günter Ziegler – mathematics (Technische Universität Berlin)

2000:

- Klaus Fiedler – cognitive social psychology (Heidelberg University)
- Peter Greil – materials science (University of Erlangen–Nuremberg)
- Matthias W. Hentze – molecular biology (European Molecular Biology Laboratory, Heidelberg)
- Peter M. Herzig – geochemistry and economic geology (Freiberg University of Mining and Technology)
- Reinhard Jahn – cellular biology (Max Planck Institute for Biophysical Chemistry (Karl Friedrich Bonhoeffer Institute), Göttingen)
- Aditi Lahiri – general linguistics (University of Konstanz)
- Gertrude Lübbe-Wolff – public law (Bielefeld University)
- Dieter Lüst – theoretical physics (Humboldt University of Berlin)
- Stefan Müller – mathematics (Max Planck Institute for Mathematics in the Sciences, Leipzig)
- Manfred Pinkal – computational linguistics (Saarland University)
- Ilme Schlichting – biophysics (Max Planck Institute for Molecular Physiology, Dortmund)
- Friedrich Temps and Hans-Joachim Werner – physical chemistry (Kiel University) and theoretical chemistry (University of Stuttgart)
- Martin Wegener – solid state physics (University of Karlsruhe)

=== 1999–1990 ===
1999 | 1998 | 1997 | 1996 | 1995 | 1994 | 1993 | 1992 | 1991 | 1990

1999:

- Ekkard Brinksmeier – manufacturing engineering (University of Bremen)
- Bernd Bukau – cellular biology (University of Freiburg)
- Joachim Cuntz – mathematics (University of Münster)
- Alois Fürstner – organometalic chemistry (Max Planck Institute für Kohlenforschung (Coal Research) (rechtsfähige Stiftung), Mülheim/Ruhr)
- Friedrich Wilhelm Graf – Evangelical theology (University of Augsburg)
- Ulrich Herbert – modern and contemporary history (University of Freiburg)
- Martin Johannes Lohse – pharmacology (University of Würzburg)
- Volker Mosbrugger – paleontology (University of Tübingen)
- Hans-Christian Pape – neurophysiology (Otto von Guericke University Magdeburg)
- Joachim Ullrich – experimental physics (University of Freiburg)

1998:

- Heinz Breer – zoology (University of Hohenheim)
- Nikolaus P. Ernsting and Klaus Rademann – physical chemistry (Humboldt University of Berlin)
- Hans-Jörg Fecht – metallic materials (University of Ulm)
- Ute Frevert – modern history (Bielefeld University)
- Wolf-Bernd Frommer – molecular plant physiology (University of Tübingen)
- Christian Griesinger – organic chemistry (Goethe University Frankfurt)
- Regine Hengge-Aronis – microbiology (University of Konstanz)
- Onno Oncken – geology (GeoForschungsZentrum, Potsdam and Free University of Berlin)
- Hermann Parzinger – prehistoric and early historical Europe (German Archaeological Institute, Berlin)
- Ingo Rehberg – experimental physics (Otto von Guericke University Magdeburg)
- Dietmar Vestweber – cellular biology/biochemistry (University of Münster)
- Annette Zippelius – solid state physics (University of Göttingen)

1997:

- Thomas Boehm – molecular development biology (Deutsches Krebsforschungszentrum, Heidelberg)
- Wolfgang Ertmer – experimental physics (Leibniz University Hannover)
- Angela D. Friederici – neuropsychology (Max Planck Institute for Neuropsychological Research, Leipzig)
- Georg Fuchs – microbiology (University of Freiburg)
- Jean Karen Gregory – material science (Technical University of Munich)
- Andreas Kablitz – Romance philology/Italian studies (University of Cologne)
- Matthias Kleiner – sheet metal forming (Brandenburg University of Technology)
- Paul Knochel – organometallic chemistry (Marburg University)
- Elisabeth Knust – development genetics (Heinrich Heine University Düsseldorf)
- Stephan W. Koch – theoretical physics (Marburg University)
- Christian F. Lehner – molecular genetics (University of Bayreuth)
- Stefan M. Maul – ancient orientalism (Heidelberg University)
- Ernst Mayr – information theory (Technical University of Munich)
- Gerhard Wörner – mineralogy/geochemistry (University of Göttingen)

1996:

- Eduard Arzt – materials science (University of Stuttgart and Max Planck Institute for Metals Research, Stuttgart)
- Hans Werner Diehl – theoretical physics (University of Duisburg-Essen)
- Gerd Faltings – mathematics (Max Planck Institute for Mathematics, Bonn)
- Ulf-Ingo Flügge – biochemistry of plants, (University of Cologne)
- Wolfgang Klein – linguistics (Max Planck Institute for Psycholinguistics, Nijmegen)
- Dieter Langewiesche – modern history (University of Tübingen)
- Reinhard Lührmann – molecular biology (Marburg University)
- Joachim Reitner – paleontology (University of Göttingen)
- Michael Reth – immunology (Max Planck Institute for Immunobiology, Freiburg)
- Wolfgang Schnick – solid state chemistry (University of Bayreuth)
- Winfried Schulze – history of early modern Europe (LMU Munich)
- Reinhard Zimmermann – history of law and civil law (University of Regensburg)

1995:

- Siegfried Bethke – elementary particle physics (RWTH Aachen University)
- Niels Birbaumer – psychophysiology (University of Tübingen)
- Hans-Joachim Freund – physical chemistry (Ruhr University Bochum)
- Martin Grötschel – applied mathematics (Technische Universität Berlin)
- Axel Haverich – surgery (Kiel University)
- Gerhard Hirzinger – robotics (German Aerospace Center, Oberpfaffenhofen)
- Thomas Jentsch – biochemistry (University of Hamburg)
- Gerd Jürgens – molecular plant development (University of Tübingen)
- Wolfgang Schleich – quantum optics (University of Ulm)
- Manfred G. Schmidt – political science (Heidelberg University)
- Thomas Schweizer (†) – cultural anthropology (University of Cologne)
- Elmar Weiler – plant physiology (Ruhr University Bochum)
- Emo Welzl – informatics (Free University of Berlin)

1994:

- Gisela Anton – experimental physics (University of Bonn)
- Manfred Broy and Ernst-Rüdiger Olderog – computer science (Technical University of Munich and University of Oldenburg)
- Ulrich R. Christensen – geophysics (University of Göttingen)
- Ulf Eysel – neurophysiology (Ruhr University Bochum)
- Theodor Geisel – theoretical physics (Goethe University Frankfurt)
- Peter Gruss – cellular biology (MPI for biophysical chemistry, Göttingen)
- Wolfgang Hackbusch – numerical mathematics (Kiel University)
- Adrienne Héritier and Helmut Willke – sociology/politology (Bielefeld University)
- Stefan Jentsch – molecular biology (Heidelberg University)
- Glenn W. Most – classical philology (Heidelberg University)
- Johann Mulzer – organic chemistry (Free University of Berlin)
- Peter Schäfer – Jewish studies (Free University of Berlin)

1993:

- Christian von Bar – international privatright (Osnabrück University)
- Johannes Buchmann and Claus Peter Schnorr – information theory (Saarland University and Goethe University Frankfurt)
- Dieter Enders – organic chemistry (RWTH Aachen University)
- Gunter Fischer – biochemistry (Martin Luther University Halle-Wittenberg)
- Michael Frotscher – neuroanatomy (University of Freiburg)
- Jürgen Jost – mathematics (Ruhr University Bochum)
- Regine Kahmann – molecular genetics (LMU Munich)
- Wolfgang Krätschmer – nuclear physics (MPI for Nuclear Physics, Heidelberg)
- Klaus Petermann – high frequency technics (Technische Universität Berlin)
- Wolfgang Prinz – psychology (MPI für für Psychologische Forschung, München)
- Rudolf G. Wagner – sinology (Heidelberg University)
- Jürgen Warnatz – technical combustion (University of Stuttgart)

1992:

- Georg W. Bornkamm – virology (GSF-Forschungszentrum für Umwelt und Gesundheit München)
- Christopher Deninger, Michael Rapoport, Peter Schneider and Thomas Zink – mathematics (University of Münster, University of Wuppertal, University of Cologne and Bielefeld University)
- Irmela Hijiya-Kirschnereit – japanology (Free University of Berlin)
- Jürgen Kocka – history of sociology (Free University of Berlin)
- Joachim Menz – mine surveying (Freiberg University of Mining and Technology)
- Friedhelm Meyer auf der Heide and Burkhard Monien – informatics (Paderborn University)
- Jürgen Mlynek – experimental physics (University of Konstanz)
- Svante Pääbo – molecular biology (LMU Munich)
- Wolfgang Raible – romanistics (University of Freiburg)
- Hans-Georg Rammensee – immunology (Max Planck Institute for Developmental Biology, Tübingen)
- Jan Veizer – geochemistry of sediments (Ruhr University Bochum)

1991:

- Gerhard Ertl – physical chemistry (Fritz Haber Institute of the MPG, Berlin)
- Dieter Fenske and Michael Veith – inorganic chemistry (University of Karlsruhe and Saarland University)
- Ernst O. Göbel – solid state physics (Marburg University)
- Dieter Häussinger – internal medicine (University of Freiburg)
- Karl-Heinz Hoffmann – applied mathematics (University of Augsburg)
- Randolf Menzel – zoology/neurobiology (Free University of Berlin)
- Rolf Müller – biochemistry/molecular biology (Marburg University)
- Hermann Riedel – material mechanics (Fraunhofer-Institut für Werkstoffmechanik Freiburg)
- Hans-Ulrich Schmincke – mineralogy/vulcanology (Research Center for Marine Geosciences (GEOMAR), Kiel)
- Michael Stolleis – history of law (Goethe University Frankfurt)
- Martin Warnke – history of art (University of Hamburg)

1990:

- Reinhard Genzel – astrophysics (Max Planck Institute for Astrophysics, Garching)
- Rainer Greger – physiology (University of Freiburg)
- Ingrid Grummt – microbiology (University of Würzburg)
- Martin Jansen and Arndt Simon – inorganic chemistry (University of Bonn and Max Planck Institute for Solid State Research, Stuttgart)
- Bert Hölldobler – zoology (University of Würzburg)
- Konrad Kleinknecht – experimental physics (University of Mainz)
- Norbert Peters – combustion engineering (RWTH Aachen University)
- Helmut Schwarz – organic chemistry (Technische Universität Berlin)
- Dieter Stöffler – planetology (University of Münster)
- Richard Wagner – material science (GKSS-Forschungszentrum Geesthacht)

=== 1989–1986 ===
1989 | 1988 | 1987 | 1986

1989:

- Heinrich Betz – neurobiology (Heidelberg University)
- Claus Wilhelm Canaris – civil law (LMU Munich)
- Herbert Gleiter – material science (Saarland University)
- Theodor W. Hänsch – laser physics (LMU Munich and Max Planck Institute for Quantum Optics, Garching)
- Joachim Milberg – production technics (Technical University of Munich)
- Jürgen Mittelstraß – philosophy (University of Konstanz)
- Sigrid D. Peyerimhoff – theoretical chemistry (University of Bonn)
- Manfred T. Reetz – organic chemistry (Marburg University)
- Michael Sarnthein and Jörn Thiede – marine geology (Kiel University and Leibniz Institute of Marine Sciences, Kiel)
- Reinhard Stock – experimental nuclear physics (Goethe University Frankfurt)
- Wolfgang Stremmel – internal medicine (Heinrich Heine University Düsseldorf)

1988:

- Karl Joachim Ebeling – high frequency technics (Technische Universität Braunschweig)
- Lothar Gall – modern history (Goethe University Frankfurt)
- Günter Harder – mathematics (University of Bonn)
- Walter Haug and Burghart Wachinger – older German literature science (University of Tübingen)
- Werner Hildenbrand – social economics (University of Bonn)
- Ingo Müller – theoretical physics (Technische Universität Berlin)
- Herbert W. Roesky and George Michael Sheldrick – inorganic chemistry (University of Göttingen)
- Wolfram Saenger and Volker Erdmann – biochemistry (Free University of Berlin)
- Günther Schütz – molecular biology (German Cancer Research Center, Heidelberg)
- Hans Wolfgang Spiess – physical chemistry (Max Planck Institute for Polymer Research, Mainz)
- Karl Otto Stetter – microbiology (University of Regensburg)
- Thomas Weiland – high energy physics (DESY (German electron synchrotron), Hamburg)

1987:

- Gerhard Abstreiter – semiconductor physics (Technical University of Munich)
- Knut Borchardt – history of economics/social economics (LMU Munich)
- Nils Claussen – ceramic materials (Hamburg University of Technology)
- Bernd Giese – organic chemistry (Technische Universität Darmstadt)
- Wolfgang A. Herrmann and Hubert Schmidbaur – inorganic chemistry (Technical University of Munich)
- Günter Hotz, Kurt Mehlhorn and Wolfgang Paul – Computer Science (Saarland University)
- Erwin Neher and Bert Sakmann – biophysical chemistry (Max Planck Institute for Biophysical Chemistry / Karl Friedrich Bonhoeffer Institute), Göttingen
- Friedrich A. Seifert – mineralogy (University of Bayreuth)
- Rudolf K. Thauer – biochemical microbiology (Marburg University)
- Hans-Peter Zenner – Otolaryngology/cell biology (University of Würzburg)

1986:

- Géza Alföldy – ancient history (Heidelberg University)
- Dietrich Dörner – psychology (University of Bamberg)
- Jürgen Habermas – philosophy (Goethe University Frankfurt)
- Otto Ludwig Lange and Ulrich Heber – ecology and biochemistry (University of Würzburg)
- Hartmut Michel – biology (Max Planck Institute of Biochemistry, Martinsried)
- Christiane Nüsslein-Volhard and Herbert Jäckle – biology (Max Planck Institute for Developmental Biology, Tübingen)
- Peter R. Sahm – casting (RWTH Aachen University)
- Fritz Peter Schäfer – laser physics (MPI für biophysikalische Chemie, Göttingen)
- Frank Steglich – solid state physics (Technische Universität Darmstadt)
- Albert H. Walenta – experimental physics (University of Siegen)
- Julius Wess – theoretical physics (University of Karlsruhe)

== See also ==
- List of general science and technology awards
- List of physics awards
