= Jürgen Rödel =

German materials scientist

Jürgen Rödel (born September 17, 1958 in Hof) is a German materials scientist and professor of non-metallic inorganic materials at the Technische Universität Darmstadt.

He is particularly well known for his fundamental and pioneering work on the mechanical and functional properties of ceramics. This includes his research work on the sintering behaviour of ceramics and the development of lead-free piezoceramics. Until then, lead-free piezo materials were considered impossible. Through meticulous research, he found the first lead-free systems with "Giant" elongation. In 2008, he received the Gottfried Wilhelm Leibniz Prize, the highest award for German researchers, for his contributions to the development of ferroelectric functional ceramics, new lead-free piezoelectric ceramics and novel gradient materials.

== Life ==
From 1977 to 1983, Rödel studied materials science at the University of Erlangen and ceramics at the University of Leeds. Rödel received his diploma in materials science from the University of Erlangen. In 1988, he received his Ph.D. in materials science from the University of California, Berkeley. In 1992, he habilitated in materials science at the TU Hamburg-Harburg. Since 1994 he has been professor of non-metallic inorganic materials at the Technische Universität Darmstadt.

== Work ==
In 2019, Rödel has acquired the research grant Reinhart-Koselleck project funded by the German Research Foundation (DFG). It was the first time for the Technische Universität Darmstadt that the grant was brought to the university. With the support he is currently working on improving ceramics by disrupting their atomic structure. His team is concentrating on a type of crystal defect that, although trivial for metals, has so far seemed unthinkable for hard ceramics. The mechanical deformation of ceramics takes place under controlled pressure and temperature.

== Publications ==
- Rödel, Jürgen; Jo, Wook; Seifert, Klaus T. P.; Anton, Eva-Maria; Granzow, Torsten; Damjanovic, Dragan (2009). "Perspective on the Development of Lead-free Piezoceramics". Journal of the American Ceramic Society. 92 (6). Wiley: 1153–1177. doi:10.1111/j.1551-2916.2009.03061.x. ISSN 0002-7820.
- Zhang, Shan-Tao; Kounga, Alain Brice; Aulbach, Emil; Ehrenberg, Helmut; Rödel, Jürgen (10 September 2007). "Giant strain in lead-free piezoceramics Bi0.5Na0.5TiO3–BaTiO3–K0.5Na0.5NbO3 system". Applied Physics Letters. 91 (11). AIP Publishing: 112906. Bibcode:2007ApPhL..91k2906Z. doi:10.1063/1.2783200. ISSN 0003-6951.
- Jo, Wook; Dittmer, Robert; Acosta, Matias; Zang, Jiadong; Groh, Claudia; Sapper, Eva; Wang, Ke; Rödel, Jürgen (27 May 2012). "Giant electric-field-induced strains in lead-free ceramics for actuator applications – status and perspective". Journal of Electroceramics. 29 (1). Springer Science and Business Media LLC: 71–93. doi:10.1007/s10832-012-9742-3. ISSN 1385-3449. S2CID 137408263.

== Awards ==
- 1992: Heinz-Maier-Leibnitz-Preis
- 2003: Fellow of the American Ceramic Society
- 2008: Gottfried-Wilhelm-Leibniz-Preis
- 2013: Member of the German Academy of Science and Engineering (Acatech)
- 2016: IEEE Ferroelectrics Recognition Award
- 2018: Robert B. Sosman Award
- 2020: Fellow of the Materials Research Society
