= Jonas Grethlein =

German classical scholar

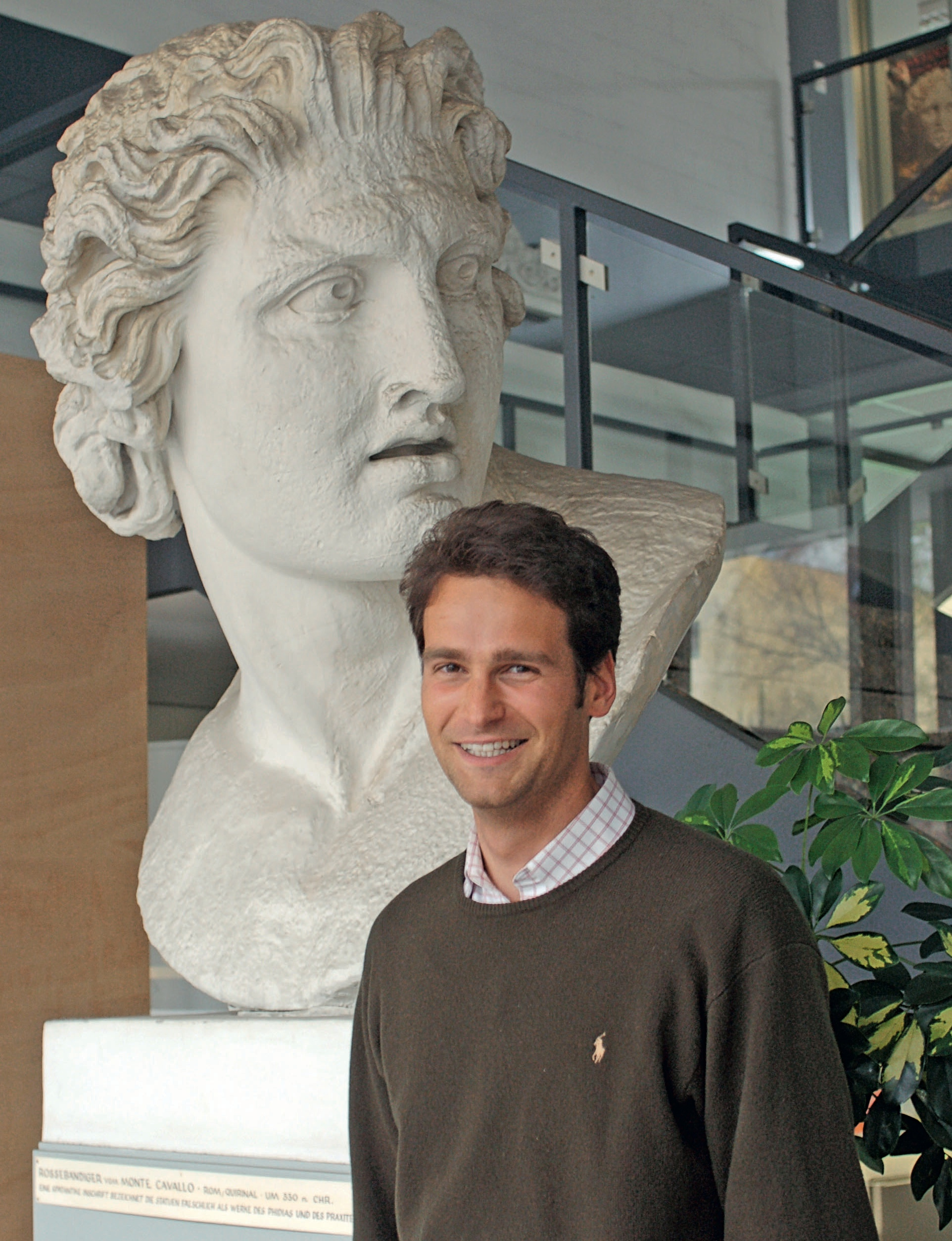
- Grethlein in 2008
- Born: 1978 (age 47–48); Munich, Bavaria, West Germany
- Awards: Heinz Maier-Leibnitz-Preis (2006)

Academic background
- Education: University of Göttingen; Trinity College, Oxford; University of Freiburg
- Thesis: Asyl und Athen. Die Konstruktion kollektiver Identität in der griechischen Tragödie (2002)

Academic work
- Discipline: Classics
- Sub-discipline: Ancient Greek literature
- Institutions: University of California, Santa Barbara; Heidelberg University

Jonas Grethlein (born 1978) is a German scholar of Ancient Greek literature. Having received a doctorate from the University of Freiburg, he is a professor of Ancient Greek at Heidelberg University. His academic work has focused on Greek tragedy, the Homeric epics, narratology, and historiography. In 2012, he was awarded a Starting Grant of about €1.4 Million by the European Research Council.

== Academic career ==
Born in 1978 in Munich, Jonas Grethlein studied Classics and History at the University of Göttingen, Trinity College, Oxford, and the University of Freiburg, where he received his Doctor of Philosophy in 2002. In 2005, he attained a habilitation in Classics and Ancient history at the same institution. In 2007, he became an assistant professor at the University of California, Santa Barbara. In 2008, he was appointed to the Chair of Ancient Greek literature at Heidelberg University. Grethlein was elected to two professorships in the United Kingdom: the Chair of Classics at the University of St Andrews in 2012, and the Regius Professorship of Greek at the University of Cambridge in 2021; he declined to take up the appointment on both occasions.

== Work ==
Grethlein wrote his doctoral dissertation (Asyl und Athen. Die Konstruktion kollektiver Identität in der griechischen Tragödie) on the topic of Greek tragedy. Continuing to publish on tragedy, has also written about the Homeric epics, narratology, and historiography.

== Honours and awards ==
In 2006, Grethlein won the Heinz Maier-Leibnitz-Preis, an award given to young researchers by the German Research Foundation. In 2012, he was awarded a Starting Grant of about €1.4 Million by the European Research Council for a project entitled AncNar – Experience and Teleology in Ancient Narrative. He has been elected to research positions at Brown University, the Berlin Institute for Advanced Study, and the Marsilius-Kolleg at Heidelberg. Since 2021, he has been a member of the Heidelberg Academy of Sciences and Humanities. In 2023, Grethlein won the Leibniz Prize.
