= Leif Kobbelt =

German Computer Science Scientist

Leif Kobbelt (born 12 December 1966 in Cologne) is a German university professor for Computer Science with a specialization in Computer Graphics. Since 2001 he is the head of the Institute for Computer Graphics and Multimedia at RWTH Aachen university.

== Life and career ==
After receiving his diploma in 1992 and his PhD in 1994 in Computer Science from the Karlsruhe Institute of Technology he worked at the University of Wisconsin-Madison, the University of Erlangen–Nuremberg and the Max Planck Institute of Computer Science before he moved to RWTH Aachen University in 2001. Here he built up an internationally renowned research group which eventually led to the foundation of the Visual Computing Institute at RWTH in 2015.

His research interests include 3D reconstruction, efficient geometry processing, realtime rendering, digital fabrication and multi-media applications. Kobbelt published a substantial number of influential papers in international top-conferences and journals. He also acts as a consultant, reviewer, and editor for international companies, research organizations and journals, respectively.

For his research he was awarded with the Heinz-Maier-Leibnitz award in 2000, the Eurographics Outstanding Technical Contribution Award 2004, two Günther Enderle Awards (in 1999 and 2012), an ERC Advanced Grant 2013 and the Gottfried Wilhelm Leibniz Prize in 2014. He was nominated as a Fellow of the Eurographics Association (2008) and as a Distinguished Professor of RWTH Aachen University (2013). In 2015 he became a member of the Academia Europaea and in 2016 a member of the North Rhine-Westphalian Academy of Sciences, Humanities and the Arts.

Besides university teaching, Leif Kobbelt is very active in communicating scientific topics to the general public.
