= Merklein =

Merklein is a German surname. Notable people with the surname include:

- Marion Merklein (born 1973), German metallurgist
- Mark Merklein (born 1972), Bahamian tennis player
- Vico Merklein (born 1977), German paracyclist
