= Greil =

Greil is the name of:

== People with the given name ==
- Greil Marcus (born 1945), American author

== People with the surname ==
- Peter Greil (fl. from 2003), German materials scientist

== Fictional characters ==
- Greil, character in Fire Emblem: Path of Radiance

== See also ==
- Micheál Mac Gréil (1931–2023), Irish Jesuit priest
