= Eduard Arzt =

Austrian physicist

Eduard Arzt is an Austrian physicist and materials scientist. He is the recipient of the Gottfried Wilhelm Leibniz Prize, the highest research award of the German Research Foundation (DFG), the Acta Metallurgica Award, and the Heyn-Award, the highest award of the German Materials Society (DGM). He is a member of the German Leopoldina Academy of Sciences in Halle, and a corresponding member of the Austrian Academy of Sciences in Vienna. In 2020, Arzt was elected an international member of the US National Academy of Engineering

== Biography ==
Arzt studied physics and mathematics at the University of Vienna, where he received his Ph.D. in 1980. Subsequent to a postdoctoral appointment at the University of Cambridge, he joined the Max Planck Institute for Intelligent Systems in Stuttgart. In 1989 and 1990 he spent a year as visiting professor at Stanford University. In 1990 he was appointed to the chair for physical metallurgy/metal physics at Stuttgart University, with a joint appointment as director at the MPI for metals research (today the MPI for Intelligent Systems). In 1996 he taught as visiting professor at the Massachusetts Institute of Technology. In 2003 he became managing director at the MPI in Stuttgart. On October 1, 2007, he took the position as scientific director and chairman at Leibniz Institute for New Materials (INM) in Saarbrücken and was appointed professor for new materials at Saarland University. During his directorship, the Leibniz Institute was thematically re-oriented into an interdisciplinary center for modern materials research. In 2023 to 2025, Eduard Arzt was Distinguished Visiting Professor in the Department of Mechanical and Aerospace Engineering of the University of California San Diego; he is currently Affiliate Faculty in the Program in Materials Science and Engineering there. In 2026, Arzt was appointed Distinguished Professor at Technical University Leoben (Montanuniversität) in Austria.

== Professional activities ==
Arzt has been invited for research stays and endowed lectures, i.a., by the Massachusetts Institute of Technology, Cambridge, US, the University of California, Santa Barbara, the University of California, San Diego, the University of Illinois at Urbana–Champaign, Case Western Reserve University, the Technion Israel Institute of Technology, the Chinese Academy of Sciences, and the University of Vienna and Graz Technological University. He is editor-in-chief of Progress in Materials Science, a review journal in the field of materials science.

== Research areas ==
Arzt has worked in numerous fields of materials science, ranging from high-temperature structural alloys, micro and nanomechanics of thin film materials, mechanisms of electromigration and degradation in miniaturized materials systems to the modeling of materials properties under extreme conditions. His current research focus lies on the synthesis and characterization of bio-inspired adhesive surfaces and their commercialization in robotics and automation.

== Awards and prizes ==
- Masing Award, German Materials Society (DGM), 1985
- Heinz Maier-Leibnitz-Preis, German Ministry for Education and Research, 1988
- Acta Metallurgica Outstanding Paper Award, 1990
- Max-Planck-Forschungspreis (with William D. Nix, Stanford), 1990
- Gottfried Wilhelm Leibniz Prize, Deutschen Forschungsgemeinschaft, 1996
- R.S. Williams Lecturer, Massachusetts Institute of Technology, 1996
- Corresponding Member of the Austrian Academy of Sciences, 1997
- Member of Deutsche Akademie der Naturforscher Leopoldina, 2002
- Advanced Grant, European Research Council (ERC), 2013
- Heyn Memorial Coin, DGM, 2017
- Member of the US National Academy of Engineering, 2020
