= Vollertsen =

Vollertsen is a surname. Notable people with the surname include:

- Frank Vollertsen (born 1958), German scientist
- Julie Vollertsen (born 1959), American volleyball player and coach
- Norbert Vollertsen (born 1958), German physician and human rights activist
