= Epigenetics & Chromatin =

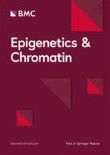
- Discipline: Epigenetics
- Language: English
- Edited by: Frank Grosveld, Steven Henikoff

Publication details
- History: 2008-present
- Publisher: BioMed Central
- Open access: Yes
- License: Creative Commons Attribution License 4.0
- Impact factor: 4.237

Standard abbreviations
- ISO 4: Epigenetics Chromatin

Indexing
- CODEN: ECPHAK
- ISSN: 1756-8935
- OCLC no.: 263688252

Links
- Journal homepage

Epigenetics & Chromatin is a peer-reviewed open access scientific journal published by BioMed Central that covers the biology of epigenetics and chromatin.

== Scope ==
Epigenetics & Chromatin is a peer-reviewed open access scientific journal that publishes research related to epigenetic inheritance and chromatin-based interactions. First published in 2008 by BioMed Central, its overall aim is to understand the regulation of gene and chromosomal elements during the processes of cell division, cell differentiation, and any alterations in the environment. To date, 13 volumes have been published.

== Usage ==
As of October 2020, there has been over 340,000 downloads and over 750 Altmetric mentions.

== Metrics ==
BMC, Part of Springer Nature

=== Impact factor ===
According to Journal Citation Reports, it received an impact factor of 4.237 in 2019. Its current SCImago Journal Rank is 2.449.

=== Citation impact ===
Its 2-year and 5-year citation impact factor is 4.237 and 4.763, respectively. Its Source Normalized Impact per Paper (SNIP) is 0.896.

== Editors ==
Its current Journal Authority Factor (JAF) is 111.5.

=== Editors-in-Chief ===
Editor	Institution
Frank Grosveld	Erasmus University Medical Center, Netherlands
Steven Henikoff	Fred Hutchinson Cancer Research Center, USA

=== Editorial Board ===
Editor	Institution
Julie Ahringer	The Gurdon Institute, University of Cambridge, UK
Juan Ausió	University of Victoria, Canada
Shelley Berger	The Wistar Institute, USA
Timothy Bestor	Columbia University, USA
Yamini Dalal	National Cancer Institute, USA
Elzo de Wit	Netherlands Cancer Institute, The Netherlands
Jerome Dejardin	Institute of Human Genetics, France
Anne Ferguson-Smith	University of Cambridge, UK
Amanda Fisher	Imperial College London, UK
John Greally	Albert Einstein College of Medicine, USA
Shiv Grewal	National Institutes of Health, USA
Joost Gribnau	Erasmus University Medical Center, Netherlands
Gordon Hager	National Cancer Institute, USA
Steven Jacobsen	University of California, Los Angeles, USA
Albert Jeltsch	University of Stuttgart, Germany
Paul Kaufman	University of Massachusetts Medical School, USA
William Kelly	Emory University, USA
Siavash Kurdistani	University of California, Los Angeles, USA
Colin Logie	Radboud University Medical Centre, The Netherlands
Frank Lyko	German Cancer Research Center, Germany
Kazuhiro Maeshima	National Institute of Genetics, Japan
Valerio Orlando	King Abdullah University of Science and Technology, Saudi Arabia
Vincenzo Pirotta	Rutgers University, USA
Ana Pombo	Max Delbrueck Centre, Germany
Oliver Rando	Harvard FAS Center for Systems Biology, USA
Jasper Rine	University of California, Berkeley, USA
Wendy Robinson	BC Children's Hospital Research Institute, Canada
Yang Shi	Harvard Medical School, USA
David Spector	Cold Spring Harbor Laboratory, USA
Brian Strahl	University of North Carolina, USA
Azim Surani	The Wellcome Trust & Cancer Research UK, UK
David Tremethick	Australian National University, Australia
Jessica Tyler	MD Anderson Cancer Center, USA
Bas van Steensel	The Netherlands Cancer Institute, Netherlands
Jörn Walter	Universität des Saarlandes, Germany
Jerry Workman	Stowers Institute for Medical Research, USA
Anton Wutz	ETH Zurich, Switzerland
Rui-ming Xu	Chinese Academy of Sciences, China
Yi Zhang	Harvard Medical School, USA

== Submission guidelines ==
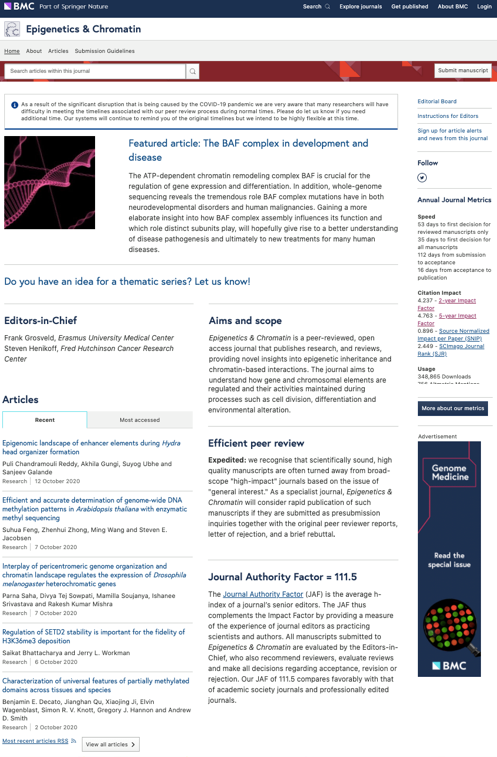
The homepage of the journal website

Current submission guidelines are as follows:

=== Prior to submitting ===
Submitters must ensure that Epigenetics & Chromatin is the most suitable journal for the proposed article in addition to understanding of the costs, funding options, and copyright agreement associated with submission. Accuracy and readability of the manuscript must also be considered.

=== During the submission process ===
The manuscript must follow all formatting rules which authors must read, understand and accept.

=== After successful submission ===
Authors should review the peer-review policy. Authors should also be familiar with the process of manuscript transfers to a different journal, as well as how to promote the publication.

=== Speed of the submission process ===
On average, it takes 53 days to reach a decision for reviewed manuscripts and 35 days for all manuscripts. The process of acceptance takes an average of 112 days after submission. After acceptance, it takes an average of 16 days for an article to be published.

== Indexing services ==
After successful publication in Epigenetics & Chromatin, articles are also included in:

- Biological Abstracts
- Chemical Abstracts (CAS)
- Citebase
- Directory of Open Access Journals (DOAJ)
- Embase
- EMBiology
- MEDLINE
- OAIster
- PubMed
- PubMed Central (PMC)
- Science Citation Index Expanded
- Scopus
- SOCOLAR
- Zetoc (operated by Jisc)

== Notable publications ==
As of October 2020, the most accessed articles are:

- Chromatin accessibility: a window into the genome (Tsompana & Buck, 2014)
- Constitutive heterochromatin formation and transcription in mammals (Saksouk et al., 2015)
- Chromatin structure and DNA damage repair (Dinant et al., 2008)
- Profiling genome-wide DNA methylation (Yong et al., 2016)
- Additional annotation enhances potential for biologically relevant analysis of the Illumina Infinium HumanMethylation450 BeadChip Array (Price et al., 2013)
