= Joachim Küpper =

German philologist, romanist and specialist in literature

Joachim Küpper (born 1952) is a professor of romance studies and comparative literature at the Free University of Berlin. Küpper has published on authors from various periods, including Homer, Dante, Petrarch, Shakespeare, Francisco de Quevedo, Pedro Calderón de la Barca, Lope de Vega, Alessandro Manzoni, Balzac, Flaubert, Theodor Fontane, and Alain Robbe-Grillet. In addition, he works on problems of literary theory and intellectual history. He is the author of eight monographs and approximately 100 articles, as well as the editor of numerous volumes and scholarly journals.

== Career ==
After studying romance literatures and history at Ruhr University Bochum, the University of Toulouse and the University of Paris, Küpper began working as assistant professor at the Institute for Romance Philology of LMU Munich in 1977. Following upon his doctoral dissertation (1980) and his habilitation (1987), he became a full professor of romance studies at the University of Wuppertal in 1989. In 2000, he switched to the Free University of Berlin, where he has since been employed as professor of romance studies and comparative literature, having declined offers from numerous other universities in Germany such as the University of Tübingen, the University of Bonn and the University of Cologne.

In 1987, Küpper was awarded the Heinz Maier-Leibnitz-Preis, and in 2001 the Gottfried Wilhelm Leibniz Prize. In 2007, he established the first center for the humanities in Germany, the Dahlem Humanities Center, at the Free University of Berlin. From 2010 to 2016, Küpper acted as principal researcher of an Advanced Grant Project under the auspices of the European Research Council (ERC). The project was dedicated to the development of a “network theory” of culture. The monograph resulting from the project, written by Küpper, was published in 2018 as The Cultural Net. Küpper has lectured at universities worldwide, including Princeton University, University of California, Los Angeles (UCLA), the Chinese University of Hong Kong, the National Research University Higher School of Economics in Moscow, and the Hebrew University of Jerusalem. For many years, he was a visiting associate professor at Johns Hopkins University in Baltimore, as well as a Directeur de recherche invité at the École des Hautes Études en Sciences Sociales (EHESS) in Paris.

Küpper is a member of the Göttingen Academy of Sciences, the North Rhine-Westphalian Academy of Sciences, Humanities and the Arts, the German National Academy (Leopoldina), and the American Academy of Arts and Sciences.
