= Jan Born =

German neuroscientist

- Citizenship: Germany
- Occupation: Professor of Behavioral Neuroscience
- Awards: Oswald-Külpe Award (2017) Leibniz Award (2010)

Academic background
- Education: University of Ulm; University of Tübingen

Jan Born (born March 30, 1958, in Celle, Germany) is a neuroscientist who researches the role of sleep in memory consolidation, problem solving, and brain plasticity. He is Head of the Institute of Medical Psychology and the Behavioral Neurobiology department at the University of Tübingen.

Born serves as the Deputy Editor of SLEEP, the Section Editor of Neurobiology of Learning and Memory, and the Associate Editor of the Journal of Sleep Research.

In 1988 Born received the Marius Tausk-Award from the German Society for Endocrinology. In 2010 he received the Leibniz Award of the Deutsche Forschungsgemeinschaft. In 2017, he received the Oswald-Külpe Award, with the award citation emphasizing that in his "very innovative studies, he was able to prove that it is not REM sleep, but deep sleep that is crucial for the transmission of information to the long-term memory of the brain and thus for memory formation."

Born is a member of the Academy of Sciences Leopoldina.

== Biography ==
Born studied psychology, mathematics, and medicine at the University of Tübingen and the University of Ulm from 1976 to 1980. He was a research fellow from 1980 to 1981 in the Department of Biological Psychology at the State University of New York at Stony Brook. He attended the University of Tübingen, where he obtained his Ph.D. in psychology in 1985. As a graduate student, Born investigated the use of potential-related events in studying brain function in humans. After completing his doctorate, Born completed his habilitation in psychology at the University of Ulm (1985-1989). Born was professor of physiological psychology at the Otto-Friedrich-University Bamberg (1989–1998) and professor of neuroendocrinology at the University of Lübeck (1999–2010) before joining the faculty of the University of Tübingen as chair of medical psychology in 2010.

Born's work has been supported by Deutsche Forschungsgemeinschaft and by the Federal Ministry of Education and Research.

== Research ==
Born researches and publishes in the field of memory formation during sleep. He was one of the first researchers to show that sleep was causally related to memory. He showed that procedural memories are not consolidated by REM sleep, as has been previously assumed. Instead, he showed that procedural memories are improved when REM sleep is pharmacologically suppressed.

Born found that slow-wave sleep reactivates recently encoded memories while REM sleep stabilizes them. As well, his research demonstrated that slow-wave sleep actually consolidates immunological memories (it helps the immune system to identify antigens) as well as psychological memories. He also found that sleep especially assists in consolidating memories that involve a promise of reward.

His other work focuses on the metabolic and behavioral control of body weight.

== Representative Publications ==
- Born, Jan; Lange, Tanja; Kern, Werner; McGregor, Gerard P.; Bickel, Ulrich; Fehm, Horst L. (6 May 2002). "Sniffing neuropeptides: a transnasal approach to the human brain". Nature Neuroscience. 5 (6). Springer Science and Business Media LLC: 514–516. doi:10.1038/nn0602-849. ISSN 1097-6256. PMID 11992114. S2CID 10826706.
- Diekelmann, Susanne; Born, Jan (4 January 2010). "The memory function of sleep". Nature Reviews Neuroscience. 11 (2). Springer Science and Business Media LLC: 114–126. doi:10.1038/nrn2762. ISSN 1471-003X. PMID 20046194. S2CID 1851910.
- Rasch, Björn; Büchel, Christian; Gais, Steffen; Born, Jan (9 March 2007). "Odor Cues During Slow-Wave Sleep Prompt Declarative Memory Consolidation". Science. 315 (5817). American Association for the Advancement of Science (AAAS): 1426–1429. Bibcode:2007Sci...315.1426R. doi:10.1126/science.1138581. ISSN 0036-8075. PMID 17347444. S2CID 19788434.
- Rasch, Björn; Pommer, Julian; Diekelmann, Susanne; Born, Jan (5 October 2008). "Pharmacological REM sleep suppression paradoxically improves rather than impairs skill memory". Nature Neuroscience. 12 (4). Springer Science and Business Media LLC: 396–397. doi:10.1038/nn.2206. ISSN 1097-6256. PMID 18836440. S2CID 5231613.
- Westermann, Jürgen; Lange, Tanja; Textor, Johannes; Born, Jan (2015). "System Consolidation During Sleep – A Common Principle Underlying Psychological and Immunological Memory Formation". Trends in Neurosciences. 38 (10). Elsevier BV: 585–597. doi:10.1016/j.tins.2015.07.007. hdl:1874/329452. ISSN 0166-2236. PMID 26442693. S2CID 3528280.
