= Rupert Huber (physicist) =

German physicist

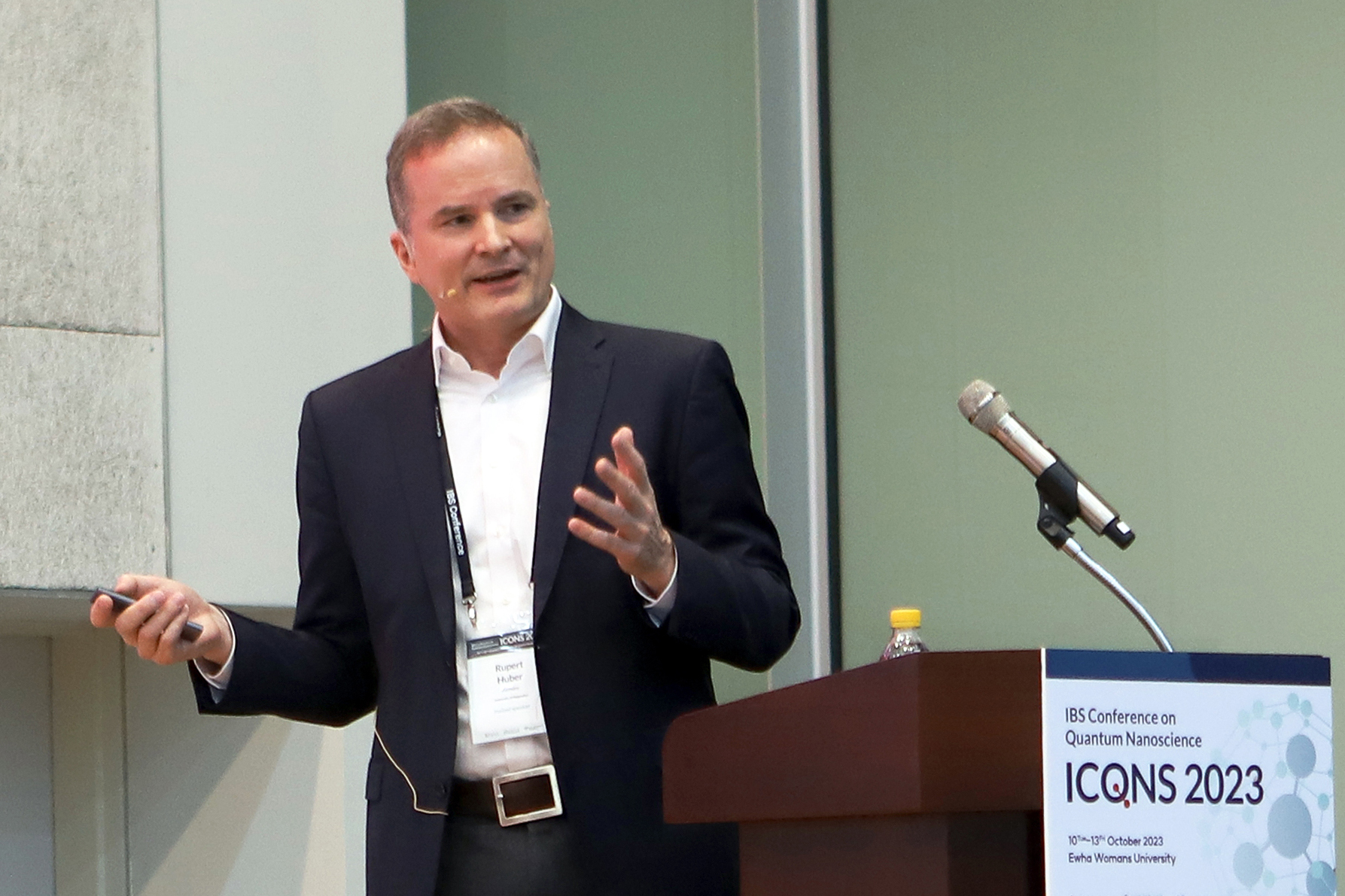
- Born: 1973 (age 52–53); Traunstein, Germany
- Education: University of California, Berkeley, Technical University of Munich
- Known for: Research in terahertz technology and semiconductor physics

Rupert Huber (born 1973, in Traunstein) is a German physicist and university professor. Huber is known for his research in terahertz technology and semiconductor physics.

== Career ==
Huber attended the Technical University of Munich where he majored in physics. He was awarded a PhD in 2003 from University of California, Berkeley. In 2010 he became a professor at the University of Regensburg.

He is particularly well known for his research on terahertz physics at the interface between optics and electronics. In the framework of so-called lightwave electronics, his research group uses the carrier field of light as an ultrafast electrical bias. He was the first to resolve key quantum dynamics on the sub-cycle time scale, such as Bloch oscillations in bulk semiconductors, quasiparticle collisions, or high-harmonic generation. He also works on ultrafast nanoscopy. In a close collaboration, the research groups of Rupert Huber and Jascha Repp (also at the University of Regensburg) demonstrated a lightwave scanning tunneling microscope in 2016, which allowed the motion of a single molecule to be directly resolved in space and time for the first time.

== Awards ==
- 2004: Feodor Lynen Research Fellowship from the Alexander von Humboldt Foundation
- 2007: Emmy-Noether grant and DFG junior research group
- 2008: European THz Young Investigator Award from the European Optical Society
- 2009: Rudolf Kaiser Prize of the Donors' Association for German Science
- 2012: ERC Starting Grant (European Research Council)
- 2016: Prize for good teaching at the state universities in Bavaria
- 2019: Gottfried Wilhelm Leibniz Prize
- 2019: Appointment as Fellow of the Optical Society of America (OSA)
