= Peter Wasserscheid =

Chemist, engineer (born 1970)

Peter Wasserscheid (born 23 October 1970 in Würzburg) is a German chemist and professor for chemical reaction engineering at the University of Erlangen-Nuremberg. Together with Matthias Beller he won the Gottfried Wilhelm Leibniz Prize in 2006.

== Personal background ==
Wasserscheid studied chemistry at the RWTH Aachen from 1991 to 1995 before he did his doctorate in the work group of Professor Wilhelm Keim. After postdoctoral research at BP in Great Britain he habilitated at the RWTH Aachen. Since October 2003, Wasserscheid holds the chair of Chemical engineering at the University of Erlangen-Nuremberg.

Wasserscheid is also a founder member of the company Solvent Innovation GmbH and Scientific Supervisor in this company since 2001.

Wasserscheid is married and has 3 children.

== Work ==
The focus of Wasserscheids work is ionic liquids where he is a pioneer, particularly in the region of developing halogenfree ionic liquids.

== Awards ==
- 1996: Friedrich-Wilhelm-Preis of the RWTH Aachen for the diploma thesis
- 1999: Borchers-Plakette of the RWTH Aachen for the dissertation
- 2000: Carl-Zerbe-Preis
- 2001: DECHEMA-Preis of the Max-Buchner-Forschungsstiftung
- 2003: Innovationspreis der Deutschen Wirtschaft
- 2006: Gottfried Wilhelm Leibniz Prize
