= Joachim Weickert =

German mathematician

Joachim Weickert (born 15 March 1965 in Ludwigshafen) is a German professor of mathematics and computer science at Saarland University. In 2010, Weickert was awarded the Gottfried Wilhelm Leibniz Prize for his work in image processing.

Weickert did his undergraduate studies at the University of Kaiserslautern and then stayed there as a graduate student, earning his doctorate in mathematics in 1996 under the supervision of Helmut Neunzert; his dissertation was titled Anisotropic Diffusion in Image Processing. After taking postdoctoral research positions at the University of Utrecht and the University of Copenhagen, he became an assistant professor at the University of Mannheim, and earned a habilitation degree there in 2001. In the same year, he took a faculty position as a full professor at Saarland University.
