= Gabriele Sadowski =

German chemist

Gabriele Sadowski (born 18 February 1964) is a German chemist.

== Early life and education ==
Sadowski studied chemistry at Technische Universität Leuna-Merseburg from 1982 to 1987. She finished her doctorate in 1991 at Technische Universität Leuna-Merseburg. She completed her dissertation at Technische Universität Berlin in 2000.

== Career and research ==
Her research focuses on Polymer Thermodynamics, Thermodynamics of Pharmaceutical Systems, and Reaction Thermodynamics. Since 2001, she is full professor at TU Dortmund University. She took over the responsibility of prorector research in 2016.

== Awards and honours ==
She was awarded the Gottfried Wilhelm Leibniz Prize in 2011 and she is a member of the North Rhine-Westphalian Academy of Sciences, Humanities and the Arts.

== See also ==
- Timeline of women in science
