= Rolf Müller (molecular biologist) =

Molecular biologist (born 1953)

Rolf Müller (born August 13, 1953) is a German molecular biologist and researcher in tumor biology and translational oncology. His work focuses on oncogenic signaling and the molecular mechanisms of cell cycle control.

From 1987 to 2019, Müller was a full professor (W3) of Molecular Biology at Philipps University of Marburg. Following his retirement from the chair, he held a Senior Professorship for Translational Oncology funded by the Anneliese Pohl Foundation at the same institution until late 2025.

== Academic career and research ==
Müller studied biology at Ruhr University Bochum, completing his diploma in 1972. He earned a doctorate in 1979 at the University of Essen under Manfred Rajewsky, where he researched the repair of alkyl-modified DNA.

Between 1981 and 1983, Müller was a postdoctoral fellow at the Salk Institute for Biological Studies in La Jolla, California. Working in the laboratory of Inder Verma, he demonstrated the tissue-specific expression of proto-oncogenes, including Fos, Fms, Kras, and Abl, during prenatal mouse development.

He later served as a group leader at the European Molecular Biology Laboratory (EMBL) in Heidelberg. His research there identified Fos as a component of the early response to growth factors. His team showed that Fos heterodimerizes with Jun to form the transcription factor AP-1, which regulates cellular responses to external stimuli.

=== Research at the University of Marburg ===
In 1987, Müller completed his habilitation and was appointed professor of tumor research at the University of Marburg. His laboratory expanded into several areas of molecular oncology:

- Cell Cycle Control: He showed that Cyclin D1 is induced by mitogens during the transition from the G0 to G1 phase, rather than being regulated in a phase-specific manner like other cyclins.
- PPARβ/δ Signaling: His group identified the oncogenic potential of the transcription factor PPARβ/δ in vivo. In collaboration with other researchers, his team developed bioavailable antagonists for this factor and characterized its role in macrophages.
- Ovarian Carcinoma: In recent years, Müller has focused on the signaling networks within the tumor microenvironment of human ovarian cancer. This research, conducted with the Marburg University Hospital, identified protein and lipid mediators associated with tumor survival, including cytokines, the adhesion molecule BCAM, and lysophosphatidic acid (LPA).

=== Academic Administration ===
Müller has held several leadership roles within the German research community. He was a primary proponent for the establishment of the Center for Tumor and Immunobiology (ZTI) in Marburg and has headed the center since 2013. His further includes a long tenure as the Director of the Institute for Molecular Biology and Tumor Research (IMT) from 2000 to 2019, as well as serving as the Vice Dean for Research of the Faculty of Medicine at Marburg between 2010 and 2022. Müller also represented the interests of the scientific community as a spokesperson for several Collaborative Research Centers (SFB) funded by the German Research Foundation (DFG), most notably SFB 215 ("Tumor and Endocrinium") and SFB 397 ("Multifactorial Nucleoprotein Complexes").

== Honors and Recognition ==
Müller has authored or co-author over 250 scientific publications. His research into gene expression and cell cycle regulation has been recognised with several awards, including the Robert Koch Promotion Prize in 1987, the German Cancer Prize in 2000, and the Leibniz Prize in 1991 and 2021. In 1990, he was elected as a member of the European Molecular Biology Organization (EMBO).
