= Daniel Rueckert =

Computer science researcher

Daniel Rueckert (born January 1969) is professor of visual information processing and former head of the Department of Computing at Imperial College London.

He received a diploma in computer science from Technische Universität Berlin and a PhD in computer science from Imperial College London entitled Segmentation and tracking in cardiovascular images using geometrically deformable models and templates.

He is a Fellow of the Royal Academy of Engineering, a Fellow of the Institute of Electrical and Electronics Engineers (IEEE), and a Fellow of the Academy of Medical Sciences.

He has an h-index of 111.

Since May 2023, Rueckert is a director of the Munich Center for Machine Learning. He was elected a Fellow of the Royal Society in 2025. In 2025, he received the Gottfried Wilhelm Leibniz Prize.
