= Christian Hertweck =

German chemist

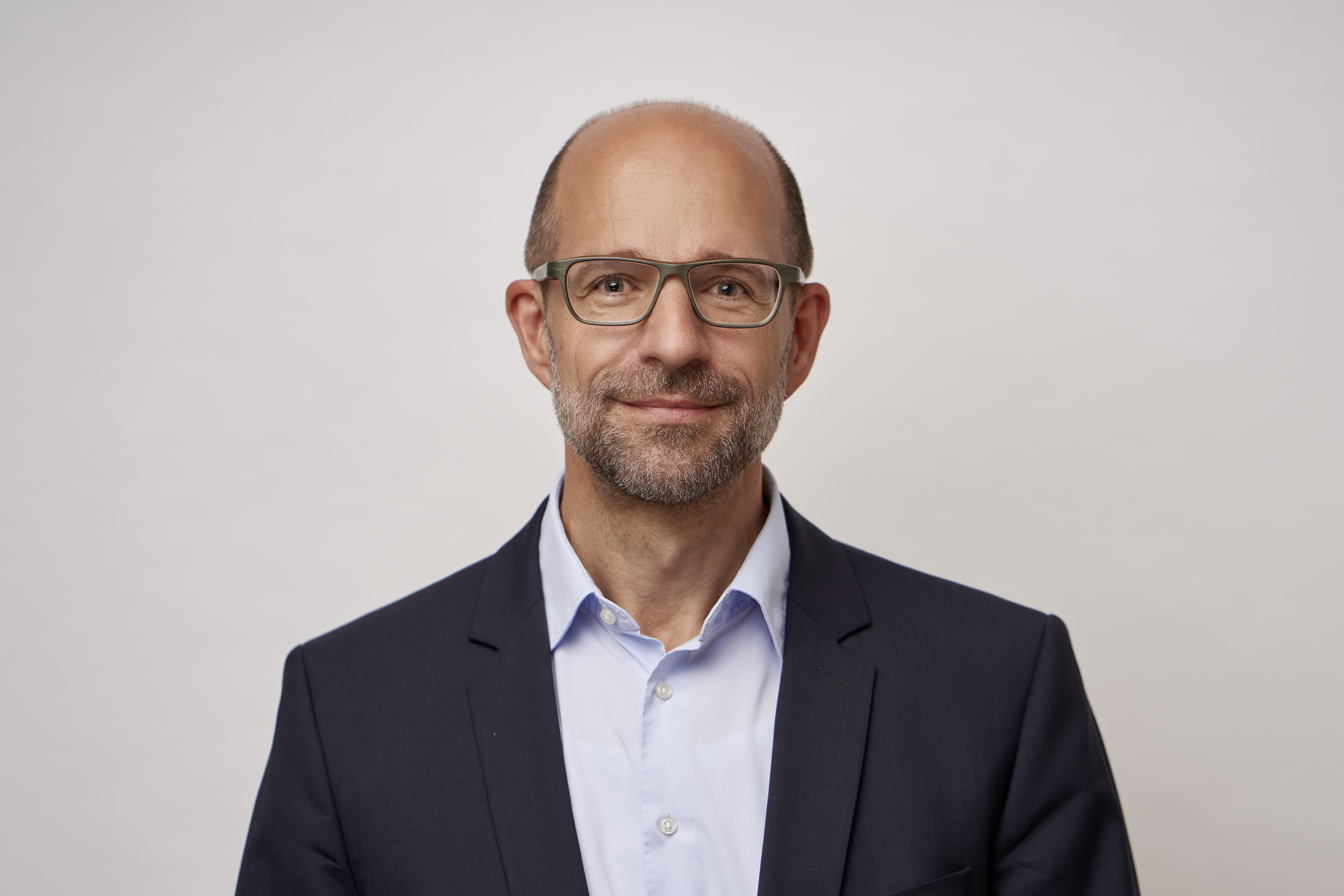
Christian Hertweck

Christian Hertweck is a German chemist, deputy director and head of the department of biomolecular chemistry at the Leibniz Institute for Natural Products Research and Infection Biology.

== Career ==
Hertweck studied chemistry at the University of Bonn and did his doctorate under Wilhelm Boland at the Max Planck Institute for Chemical Ecology in 1996–1999. After a research stay (1999–2000) with Heinz G. Floss and Bradley S. Moore at the University of Washington, Seattle, US, funded by a Feodor Lynen Research Fellowship for Postdoctoral Researchers (Alexander von Humboldt Foundation), he started his independent research as head of a junior research group at the Hans Knöll Institute (2001–2005), which led to a habilitation (venia legendi) in organic chemistry at the FSU Jena. Since 2006, he has been full professor at the Friedrich Schiller University Jena (chair of natural product chemistry) and head of the department of biomolecular chemistry at the Leibniz Institute for Natural Product Research and Infection Biology; in 2008 he became deputy director of the institute.

== Area of research ==
Hertweck's research focuses on specialized metabolites of bacteria and fungi with the intent to identify pharmacologically relevant substances and to understand how they are assembled. Genetic methods (genome mining) and are primarily used to discover new active substances. To modify the structures of natural substances, his research group uses synthetic and enzymatic methods as well as synthetic biology approaches, in which genes from active substance producers are modified or recombined. He has co-authored over 350 publications and articles in scientific journals. In 2015, he was awarded the Leibniz Prize of the German Research Foundation for his research on bioactive natural products from microorganisms.
