= Peter Becker (biologist) =

German molecular biologist (born 1958)

- Born: 12 September 1958 (age 68); Frankfurt am Main, West Germany
- Education: Heidelberg University, German Cancer Research Center
- Awards: Gottfried Wilhelm Leibniz Prize (2005)
- Scientific career
- Fields: Molecular biology
- Workplaces: LMU Munich

Peter Burkhard Becker (born 1958) is a German molecular biologist. He studied biology at Heidelberg University until 1984 and finished his Ph.D. at the German Cancer Research Center and Heidelberg University in 1987.

After being employed at the European Molecular Biology Laboratory (EMBL) from 1991 until 1999, he became head of the Adolf Butenandt Institute for molecular biology at LMU Munich. In 2000, he was elected as a member of EMBO.

In 2005, he received the Gottfried Wilhelm Leibniz Prize of the Deutsche Forschungsgemeinschaft, which is the highest honour awarded in German research. In 2007, he became a member of the German Academy of Sciences Leopoldina. He became chair of EMBL Council, the governing body of EMBL, in 2023, having served as a delegate since 2016.
