= Hendrik Dietz =

German biophysicist

- Born: 18 December 1977; Dresden, Germany
- Education: Technical University of Munich; LMU Munich; Paderborn University
- Known for: DNA Origami
- Awards: Leibniz Prize (2015)
- Scientific career
- Fields: Physics
- Workplaces: Technical University of Munich; Harvard University

Hendrik Dietz (born December 18, 1977, in Dresden Germany) is a German physicist known for his contributions in the field of DNA origami. He is founder and CEO of CPTx and a full-professor for biophysics at the Technical University of Munich (TUM).

== Life ==
Dietz studied physics at Paderborn University, the University of Zaragoza, and at LMU Munich. He completed his studies with a diploma in 2004. Subsequently, he became a research associate at the Technical University of Munich (TUM). In 2007, he earned his Dr. rer. nat. with research on the mechanical anisotropy of proteins in single-molecule experiments. After that, he spent two years as a postdoc at Harvard University. Since the summer of 2009, he has been a Professor of Biophysics at TUM.

== Research ==
Dietz's main research focus is on DNA nanotechnology. He uses DNA origami to design molecular machines that can execute user-defined tasks. Among these devices are force-sensing nano-structures, gigadalton-sized DNA assemblies, dynamically switching devices, molecular motors, and virus traps.

In the long term, Dietz hopes to make a significant contribution to the creation of molecular machines and systems with practical benefits for everyday life. This includes uses in medicine such as vaccines or drug delivery vehicles and synthetic enzymes for biologically inspired chemistry.

== Awards ==
- 2010, European Research Council (ERC) Starting Grant
- 2015, Gottfried Wilhelm Leibniz Prize of the German Research Foundation (DFG)
- 2016, European Research Council (ERC) Consolidator Grant
- 2021, European Research Council Advanced Grant
