= Andreas Dreizler =

German physicist

Andreas Dreizler (born 27 March 1966 in Freiburg im Breisgau, Germany) is a German physicist, professor of mechanical engineering at the Technische Universität Darmstadt and heads the research group Reactive Flows and Diagnostics.

In 2014, he received the Gottfried Wilhelm Leibniz Prize, the highest award for researchers in Germany, for his achievements in quantitative laser diagnostics of reactive flows. His scientific achievements include, for example the world's first measurements of hydrocarbon concentrations and temperatures in flames using nonlinear optics.

== Life ==
Andreas Dreizler studied physics at the University of Kiel, where he received his intermediate diplom in 1988. He continued his studies at the Ruprecht-Karls-University Heidelberg and received his diplom in 2002. During this time, he had research stays at the University of Oxford supported by a DAAD scholarship. In 2005 he received his doctorate in physical chemistry under Jürgen Wolfrum with a thesis on polarization spectroscopy. The title of his dissertation was "Einsatz von Vierwellenmischug und Polarisationsspektroskopie zur Diagnostik reaktiver Strömungen" (Use of four-wave mixing and polarization spectroscopy for the diagnosis of reactive flows). He then worked as a technology consultant for laser technology at the Association of German Engineers in Düsseldorf and as a university assistant and working group leader at the Institute for Technical Combustion at the University of Stuttgart. In 2002 he completed his habilitation in combustion technology with Johannes Janicka at the Technische Universität Darmstadt. The title of his habilitation thesis was "Über Experimente zur Entwicklung und Validierung von Modelle für die Beschreibung turbulenter Flammen" (On Experiments for the Development and Validation of Models for the Description of Turbulent Flames).

He is married and has four children. He is a member of the German Bunsen Society for Physical Chemistry, the Optical Society and the German Section of the Combustion Institute.

== Publications ==
- Schneider, Ch.; Dreizler, A.; Janicka, J.; Hassel, E.P. (2003). "Flow field measurements of stable and locally extinguishing hydrocarbon-fuelled jet flames". Combustion and Flame. 135 (1–2): 185–190. Bibcode:2003CoFl..135..185S. doi:10.1016/S0010-2180(03)00150-0. ISSN 0010-2180.
- Brübach, Jan; Pflitsch, Christian; Dreizler, Andreas; Atakan, Burak (2013). "On surface temperature measurements with thermographic phosphors: A review". Progress in Energy and Combustion Science. 39 (1): 37–60. Bibcode:2013PECS...39...37B. doi:10.1016/j.pecs.2012.06.001. ISSN 0360-1285.
- Dreizler, A.; Böhm, B. (2015). "Advanced laser diagnostics for an improved understanding of premixed flame-wall interactions". Proceedings of the Combustion Institute. 35 (1): 37–64. Bibcode:2015PComI..35...37D. doi:10.1016/j.proci.2014.08.014. ISSN 1540-7489.
