= Albert H. Walenta =

German physicist (born 1943)

Albert H. Walenta (born 2 October 1943) is professor for experimental physics at the University of Siegen in Germany.

In 1986 he received the Leibniz Prize by the German Research Foundation.
