= Carmen Birchmeier =

German geneticist and developmental biologist

Carmen Birchmeier-Kohler, (née Kohler; born July 6, 1955, in Waldshut-Tiengen) is a German geneticist and developmental biologist. The focus of her research group is the development of embryonic tissues and the nervous system. The model organism for her investigations is the mouse.

== Life and work ==
Birchmeier studied biochemistry at the University of Konstanz, the University of California, San Diego and the ETH Zurich from 1974 to 1979. She completed her PhD thesis with Max Birnstiel in 1984 at the Institute of Molecular Biology II at the University of Zurich. After a stay abroad as a postdoctoral fellow with Michael Wigler and as a scientist at the Cold Spring Harbor Laboratory on Long Island (USA) from 1984 to 1989, she took over the direction of a working group in the Max Planck Institute for Plant Breeding Research in Cologne. There she completed her habilitation in 1993.

Since 1995 she works at the Max Delbrück Center for Molecular Medicine (MDC) in Berlin. In 2002 she received a C4-professorship at the Faculty of Medicine of Freie Universität Berlin, now Charité.

Carmen Birchmeier is married to developmental biologist and cancer researcher Walter Birchmeier.

== Research interests ==
Birchmeier is concerned with the molecular biology of embryogenesis and organogenesis in mammals and their significance for abnormal development of the nervous system, in skeletal muscle and heart diseases as well as in cancer. With the help of knockout mice, Birchmeier-Kohler and co-workers were able to elucidate the role of various growth factors or their receptors and the transcription factors they control for the development of the organism.

== Awards and honors ==
In 2002 she was awarded the Gottfried Wilhelm Leibniz Prize for her research on signal transduction between cells during embryonic and organ development of mammals.

== Memberships (selection) ==
Since 2013 she is a member of the Academia Europaea. In 2018 she was elected a member of the German Academy of Sciences Leopoldina.
