= Erika von Mutius =

German pediatrician and allergologist

Erika von Mutius (born 14 May 1957 in Bonn, Germany) is a German pediatrician and allergologist at the Helmholtz Center Munich and LMU Munich. Her research interests include paediatrics, pediatric pneumology, allergology and epidemiology.

== Life ==
Her parents were Franz von Mutius and Hanna Elisabeth von Mutius, née Gazert. Her mother came from a Partenkirchen-based medical family of North German origin. Her maternal grandfather was the German expedition physician and medical officer Hans Gazert; his father, Medical Council Ludolph Friedrich Gazert, originated from a Luneburger merchant family.

== Career ==
Erika von Mutius studied Medicine from 1976 to 1984 at LMU Munich. From 1984 to 1992 she was trained as a specialist in pediatrics at the Dr. von Hauner Children's Hospital of LMU Munich with all general pediatric wards, the neonatal intensive care unit, the pediatric intensive care unit and the pediatric surgical ambulance. In July 1992 she passed the pediatric exam.

She was a senior physician at the Haunersches Children's Hospital and habilitated in 1998. Since 2000, she has been Head of the Allergy and Asthma Department of the hospital. In 2004, she was appointed Professor of Pediatrics at LMU Munich.

Since 2017, she has been the Director of the new Institute for Asthma and Allergy Prevention (IAP) at Helmholtz Center Munich.

== Research ==
Erika von Mutius received the Gottfried Wilhelm Leibniz Prize in 2013 for her basic insights into the causes of childhood lung diseases – in particular epidemiological studies on allergic asthma.

She is one of the first allergy researchers who found out after the fall of the German wall in 1989/90 that in the GDR, despite the poorer environmental conditions caused by the air pollution, proportionately only half as many allergies existed as in the Federal Republic of Germany. After the reunification, the same level in both parts of the country was reached within a few years. Erika von Mutius suspected that the children had more contact with other children through their daycare in kindergarten. She stated in comparative studies that despite higher air pollution in Leipzig compared to Munich, the risk of asthma in children was not higher. She also found that children who grow up in the countryside and who are in contact with animals have a lower risk of allergies.

== Awards ==
- 1996: Award of the European Respiratory Society for Pediatric Respiratory Research in Europe
- 1999: Elliot Ellis Lectureship at the American Academy of Allergy, Asthma and Immunology Annual Meeting
- 2004: Robert Sauer Prize of the Bavarian Academy of Sciences
- 2008: European Medal of the Bavarian State Chancellery
- 2010: Honorary Doctor of the University of Helsinki
- 2011: Daniel Bovet Award for improving treatment and prevention of allergic diseases
- 2013: Gottfried Wilhelm Leibniz Prize for "fundamental discoveries related to the formation and treatment of lung disease in children".
- 2013: Order of Merit of the Federal Republic of Germany
- 2019: Balzan Prize

== Memberships ==
- since 2014 Leopoldina
- since 2016 member of the Academia Europaea
- European Respiratory Society (ERS)
- European Academy of Allergy and Clinical Immunology (EAACI)

== Editorships ==
Erika von Mutius is a member of the Editorial Board of the New England Journal of Medicine and editor of the Journal of Allergy and Clinical Immunology and the European Respiratory Journal.
