= Markus Reichstein =

- Occupation: professor

Academic work
- Discipline: Geology
- Sub-discipline: Biogeochemistry
- Institutions: University of Jena

Markus Reichstein is a German biogeochemist, artificial intelligence researcher and University of Jena professor. He is a fellow of the European Laboratory for Learning and Intelligent Systems and the American Geophysical Union. He won a Leibniz Prize in 2020.
