= Hannah Monyer =

German biologist

Prof. Dr. Hannah Monyer
- Born: 3 October 1957 (age 68); Laslea, Romania
- Education: University of Heidelberg
- Awards: Gottfried Wilhelm Leibniz Prize
- Scientific career
- Fields: Neurobiology
- Workplaces: University of Heidelberg

Hannah Monyer (born 3 October 1957 in Laslea, Romania) is a Romanian-born (Transylvanian Saxon) German neurobiologist and, since 1999, she has been Director of the Department of Clinical Neurology at the University Hospital in Heidelberg. In 2004 she was awarded the 1.55 million euro Gottfried Wilhelm Leibniz Prize. She received the Philip Morris Research Prize—described by Bio-pro as "one of the most prestigious science awards in Germany"—in 2006. In 2010, the European Research Council awarded her a total of 1.87 million euros for her research.

Her research has examined the composition of NMDA receptors and their expression patterns in brain cell populations. NMDA receptors are relevant to synaptic plasticity and ultimately to the brain's capacity to remember and learn. She has also shown that there are different kinds of glutamate receptor, studied various neurological disorders, and the modulation of gamma-Aminobutyric acid interneurones in a genetic paradigm. She developed the new techniques in molecular analysis that underlie her work.

Monyer is an associate editor of Frontiers in Molecular Neuroscience, published by the University of Heidelberg, and a member of the Senate of the Deutsches Zentrum für Neurodegenerative Erkrankungen ((in German) "German Centre for Neurodegenerative Diseases".)

After receiving her MD in 1983, Monyer did postdoctoral work at Stanford University Medical Centre. She returned to Heidelberg in 1989, where she received a Schilling endowment professorship before setting up her own research group.

The Siebenbürgische Zeitung ((in German) "Transylvanian Newspaper") describes her as "multilingual and highly musical", mentioning her proficiency with the piano and her ability to speak to most of her multinational employees in their own language.
