= Ulrike Herzschuh =

German geoecologist

- Education: Free University of Berlin (PhD, 2004)
- Awards: Gottfried Wilhelm Leibniz Prize (2024)
- Scientific career
- Fields: Geoecology, Palaeoclimatology
- Workplaces: Alfred Wegener Institute; University of Potsdam

Ulrike Herzschuh is a German geoecologist and palaeoclimatologist. She leads the Polar Terrestrial Environmental Systems section at the Alfred Wegener Institute (AWI), Helmholtz Centre for Polar and Marine Research in Potsdam, a position she has held since 2012.

== Career ==
Herzschuh completed her doctorate at the Free University of Berlin in 2004. She then worked as a researcher at the University of Bergen in Norway before returning to Germany. In 2005 she was appointed junior professor of palaeoecology and palaeoclimatology at the University of Potsdam.

She has been elected as Germany's representative on the international expert committees of the International Arctic Science Committee (IASC) and Conservation of Arctic Flora and Fauna (CAFF).

== Research ==
Herzschuh's work examines how climate fluctuations over geological time have affected biodiversity, particularly in Arctic and high-mountain environments. She conducts fieldwork in Siberia, Antarctica, the Tibetan Plateau, and Alaska, collecting sediment cores from lakes and marine deposits. These cores contain fossil pollen, chironomid midges, stable isotopes, and biomarkers that allow reconstruction of past climates.

Her group has contributed to developing methods for extracting ancient DNA (aDNA) from lake sediments to track changes in species composition over millennia. They have also developed individual-based vegetation models incorporating plant functional traits.

In 2018 she received an ERC Consolidator Grant for the project Glacial Legacy (grant no. 772852), which examined whether present-day plant distributions in Arctic and subarctic regions still reflect the influence of the last glacial period.

== Awards ==
Year	Award	Awarding body
2003	Bernd-Rendel-Preis	Deutsche Forschungsgemeinschaft
2008	Brandenburg State Early Career Prize	State of Brandenburg
2010	Albert Maucher Prize for Geosciences	Deutsche Forschungsgemeinschaft
2018	ERC Consolidator Grant	European Research Council
2024	Gottfried Wilhelm Leibniz Prize	Deutsche Forschungsgemeinschaft
