= Marion Merklein =

German metallurgist (born 1973)

Marion Merklein (born 1973) is a German metallurgist who studies metal forming, including stamping and additive manufacturing. She is a professor of mechanical engineering at the University of Erlangen–Nuremberg, where she heads the Institute of Manufacturing Technology.

== Education and career ==
Merklein earned a diploma (the German equivalent of a master's degree) in material science in 1997 from the University of Erlangen–Nuremberg, and continued at the same university for a doctorate in mechanical engineering, through the university's Institute of Manufacturing Technology, which she completed in 2001. Her dissertation concerned the use of lasers in the additive manufacturing of aluminum alloys.

From 2001 to 2008 she worked as a senior manager in the Institute of Manufacturing Technology, on sheet metal forming, earning a habilitation in 2006. In 2008 she took a professorship in the institute, serving as dean of engineering from 2011 to 2015.

== Recognition ==
Merklein was a 2004 recipient of the Heinz Maier-Leibnitz-Preis and a 2013 recipient of the Gottfried Wilhelm Leibniz Prize. With Jürgen Lechler, she was a 2008 recipient of the SAE/AISI Sydney H. Melbourne Award for Excellence in the Advancement of Automotive Sheet Steel.

In 2015, she was elected to the German National Academy of Sciences Leopoldina and to the Berlin-Brandenburg Academy of Sciences and Humanities. She is also a member of acatech, the German Academy of Science and Engineering, and a Fellow of the International Academy for Production Engineering.

She received the Bavarian Order of Merit in 2018.
