= Christoph Klein =

German pediatrician and oncologist

Christoph Klein (born 18 August 1964 in Kirchen (Sieg)) is a German Pediatric Hematologist/Oncologist and Director at the Dr. von Hauner Children’s Hospital, LMU Munich, Germany.

== Career ==
Christoph Klein completed clinical and scientific training at the Dr. von Hauner Children's Hospital Munich, Hôpital Necker Enfants Malades, Paris, University Children's Hospital Freiburg, and Boston Children's Hospital. He was Chair of the Department of Pediatric Hematology/Oncology at Hannover Medical School before being appointed Chair of the Department of Pediatrics at LMU Munich in 2011.

Klein and his laboratory investigate clinical, genetic and cell biological aspects of rare diseases of the blood and immune system. By studying rare human diseases, his team is interested in elucidating basic mechanisms orchestrating the development and function of hematopoietic and immune cells. Furthermore, the team strives toward the development of novel cell- and gene-based therapeutic strategies.

He discovered numerous diseases and conducted the first clinical gene therapy study for patients with Wiskott Aldrich syndrome.

Klein co-founded the international Care-for-Rare Foundation for children with rare diseases. Care-for-Rare is a non-profit organization following the Leitmotiv "From Discovery to Cure". No child should be destined to suffer or die just because his or her disease is very rare, regardless of ethnic origin and the financial opportunities of his or her family.

== Honors and awards ==
The American Society of Hematology honored Klein with a scholar award (1998) and the William-Dameshek Prize (2011). Klein is also recipient of the Gottfried Wilhelm Leibniz Prize awarded by the German Research Society (2010), the Adalbert Czerny Prize awarded by the German Society for Pediatrics (2007), the Eva Luise Köhler Prize for Rare Diseases (2011), and the Khwarizmi International Award by the Islamic Republic Iran (2016).

The American Society of Clinical Investigation (2014) and the Hector Fellow Academy (2013) elected Klein as member.

He is also recipient of the Cusanus-Award for his philanthropic and social activities (2015).
