= Eike Kiltz =

German cryptographer and professor

- Born: Germany
- Education: Ruhr University Bochum (PhD, 2004)
- Awards: Gottfried Wilhelm Leibniz Prize (2024); ERC Consolidator Grant (2013); Sofja Kovalevskaja Award (2010)
- Scientific career
- Fields: Cryptography, Complexity theory
- Workplaces: Ruhr University Bochum

Eike Kiltz is a German cryptographer and professor of computer science at Ruhr University Bochum.

== Career ==
Kiltz studied mathematics at Ruhr University Bochum, where he completed his PhD in 2004. He then worked as a postdoctoral researcher at the University of California, San Diego, before moving to the Centrum Wiskunde & Informatica in Amsterdam in 2005. In 2010, he accepted a professorship at Ruhr University Bochum.

From 2010 to 2014, he received funding through a Sofja Kovalevskaja Award from the Alexander von Humboldt Foundation. In 2013, he was awarded an ERC Consolidator Grant (ERC-2013-CoG-615073-ERCC) by the European Research Council.

He is an editorial board member of the Journal of Cryptology (Springer) and a board member of the Horst Görtz Institute for IT Security.

== Research ==
Kiltz's research focuses on public-key cryptography, post-quantum cryptography, and complexity theory. He contributed to the development of CRYSTALS-Kyber and CRYSTALS-Dilithium, two cryptographic schemes that were selected by the National Institute of Standards and Technology (NIST) as post-quantum cryptography standards in 2024. These standards are intended to resist attacks by future quantum computers.

== Awards ==
Year	Award	Awarding body
2010	Sofja Kovalevskaja Award	Alexander von Humboldt Foundation
2013	ERC Consolidator Grant	European Research Council
2024	Gottfried Wilhelm Leibniz Prize	Deutsche Forschungsgemeinschaft
