= Jörg Wrachtrup =

German physicist

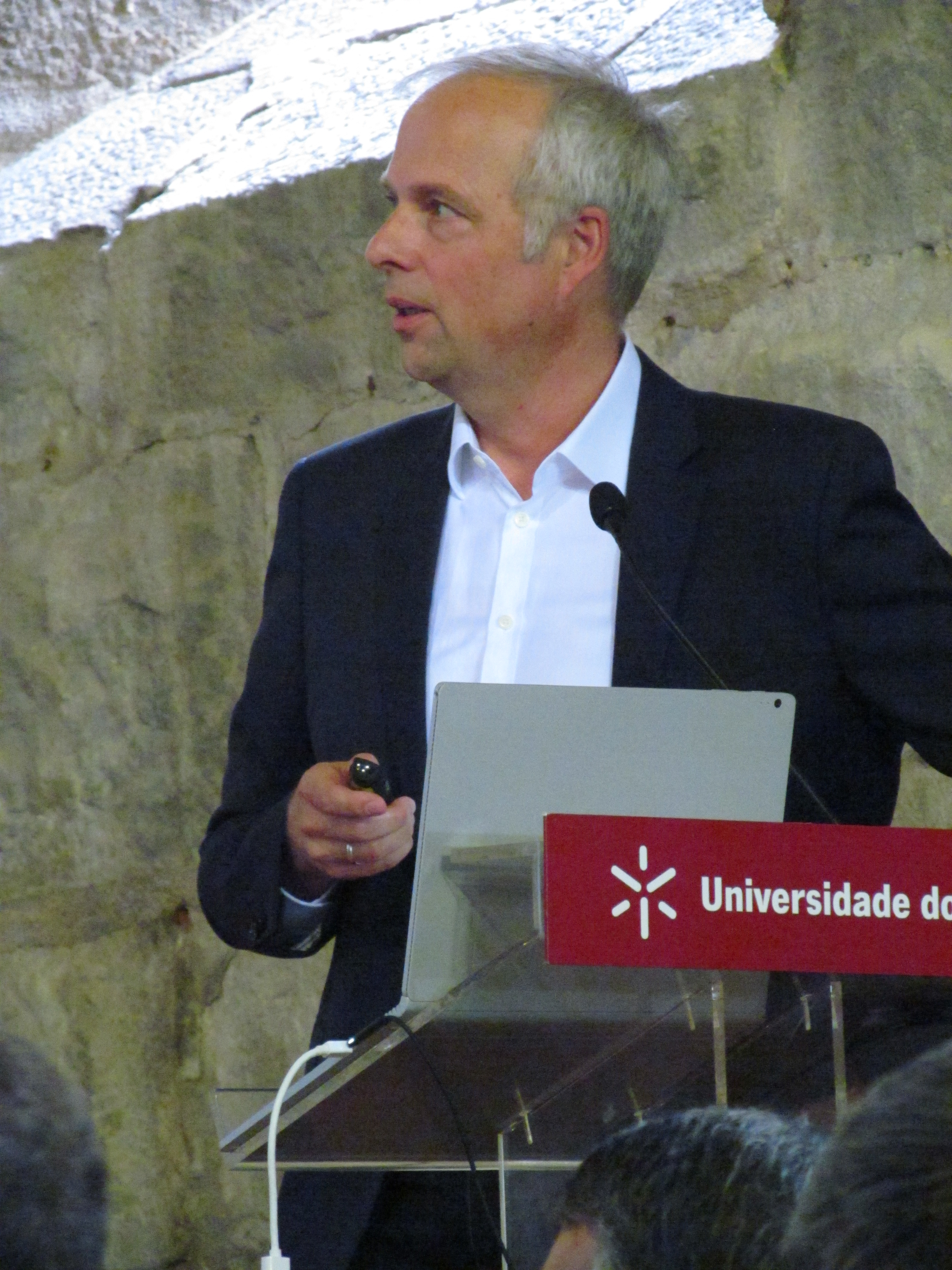
Jörg Wrachtrup in 2016.

Jörg Wrachtrup (born 27 December 1961) is a German physicist. He is director of the 3rd Institute of Physics and the Centre for Applied Quantum Technology at Stuttgart University. He is an appointed Max Planck Fellow at the Max Planck Institute for Solid State Research in Stuttgart. Wrachtrup is a pioneer in solid state quantum physics. Already in his PhD thesis, he carried out the first electron spin resonance experiments on single electron spins. The work was done in close collaboration with M. Orrit at the CNRS Bordeaux. To achieve the required sensitivity and selectivity, optical excitation of single molecules was combined with spin resonance techniques. This optically detected magnetic resonance is based on spin dependent optical selection rules. An important part of the early work was coherent control. As a result the first coherent experiments on single electron spins and nuclear spins in solids were accomplished.

While working at the Chemnitz University of Technology, he headed a research team that has, for the first time, detected the optical as well as spin signal of a single dopant atom in a solid. The particular dopant, was a nitrogen atom joined by a vacancy, the nitrogen-vacancy center (N-V) in diamond. This pioneering work has created standards for numerous follow-up studies of individual N-V centers aiming at manipulations of individual electron and nuclear spins in solids (quantum computer). In contrast to the earlier studies on single molecules the target spin state in these system is a ground state. This facilitates quantum control as spin relaxation and coherence times turned out to be exceptionally long, even under ambient conditions. In addition the defect center proved to be unconditionally photostable, in contrast to most other single quantum emitters. This discovery is the basis for numerous applications of defects in diamond as single photon source, quantum register and in magnetometry.

Wrachtrup has made several pioneering contribution to solid state quantum physics. Most notably this is demonstration of nanoscale quantum sensing of magnetic fields using single defects. His group accomplished spin Hamiltonian engineering to measure electric fields as well as temperature using single defect centers. The first entanglement between single electron and nuclear spins in solids as well as single shot quantum state readout was accomplished by his group. Nanoscale quantum sensors also proved to be capable to detects single electron spins as well as measure nuclear magnetic resonance signals with unprecedented sensitivity and spatial resolution.

Wrachtrup received numerous awards for his work, including the Leibniz Prize of the German Science Foundation, the Max Planck award of the Humboldt Foundation and the Max Planck Society, the Zeiss Research Award, the Gold Medal of the International Society for Electron Spin Resonance, the Heinrich Hertz Award of the German Physical Socienty. Wrachtrup is continuously listed as Highly Cited Researcher since 2014 and has been appointed as Max Planck Fellow of the Max Planck Institute for Solid State Research as well as member of the Berlin Brandenburg Academy of Science.
