= Dieter Fenske =

German chemist (1942)

Dieter Fenske (born 29. September 1942) is a German inorganic chemist.

== Life ==
Fenske studied chemistry at the University of Münster, received his PhD in 1973 and his Habilitation in 1978. He is Professor for Inorganic chemistry at the University of Karlsruhe and Director at the Institute for Nanotechnology (INT) of Forschungszentrum Karlsruhe.

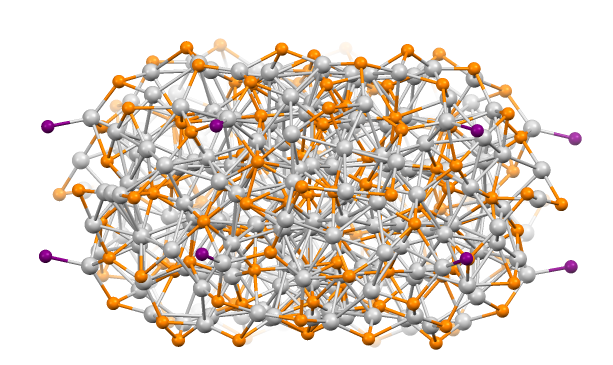
Nanoscale Phosphine-stabilized Ag-S cluster prepared by Fenske et al. Color code: gray = Ag, violet = P, orange = S.

== Awards ==
In 1991, he received the Gottfried Wilhelm Leibniz Prize of the Deutsche Forschungsgemeinschaft. In 1993, he was awarded the Wilhelm-Klemm Award of the Society of German Chemists. Since 1999, he is a full member of the Heidelberg Academy of Sciences and Humanities. In 2005, he received a Doctor honoris causa title from the Russian Academy of Sciences in Novosibirsk. Since 2007, he is a member of the Academy of Sciences Leopoldina.
