= Britta Nestler =

German mathematician

Britta Nestler (born 1972) is a German materials scientist at the Karlsruhe Institute of Technology. Her research involves the development of software to simulate the formation of microstructures in advanced materials for which experimental studies would be too expensive or difficult.

Nestler did her undergraduate and graduate studies in mathematics and physics at RWTH Aachen University. She joined the Karlsruhe University of Applied Sciences in 2001 and moved to the Karlsruhe Institute of Technology in 2009.

In 2017, the Deutsche Forschungsgemeinschaft awarded to her the Gottfried Wilhelm Leibniz Prize "for her significant, internationally recognised research in computer-assisted materials research and the development of new material models with multiscale and multiphysical approaches".
