= Wolfgang Peukert =

German process engineer (born 1958)

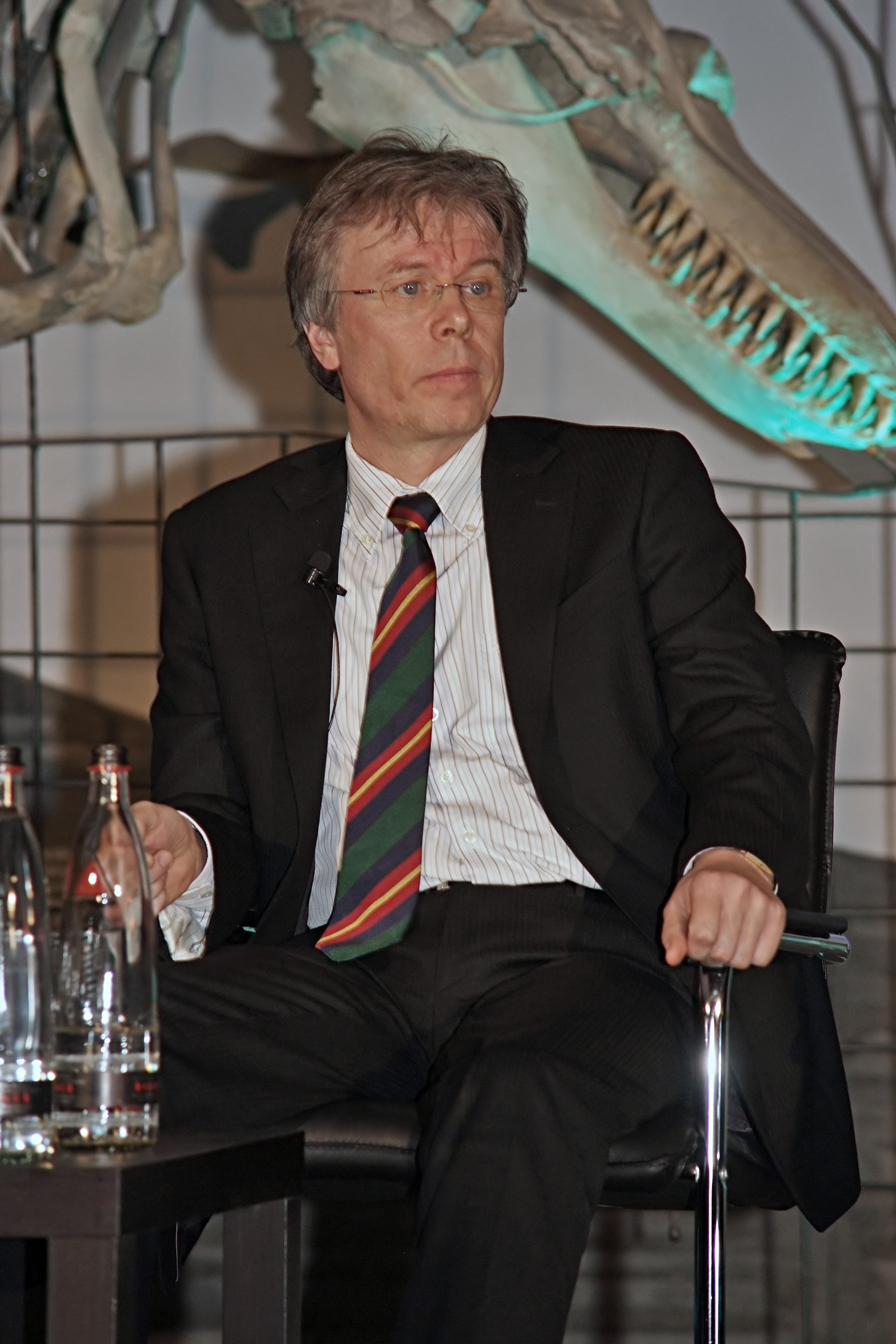
Wolfgang Peukert, 2009

Wolfgang Peukert (born 9 June 1958 in Karlsruhe) is a German process engineer. He won the Gottfried Wilhelm Leibniz Prize in 2005.

== Life ==
Wolfgang Peukert studied chemical engineering at the University of Karlsruhe and received his doctorate in 1990 at the Institute of Mechanical Process Engineering with the topic "The combined separation of particles and gases in packed bed filters". After seven years in the development department of the Japanese Hosokawa Group, he became a full professor at the Institute of Particle Technology, Technical University of Munich (TUM) in 1998. He moved to the Institute of Particle Technology at the Friedrich-Alexander University Erlangen - Nürnberg, Chair and full professor, in 2003.

== Scientific work ==
Prof. W. Peukert works and shapes the scientific field of particle technology. Starting from the field of mechanical process engineering, he develops particle technology into an interdisciplinary field of research. By combining the working methods of physics, chemistry and process engineering, individual processes and process-structure-property relationships are fundamentally investigated.

Using experimental, analytical and theoretical methods, he mainly studies particles with sizes in the submicrometric and nanometer range, where the surface properties have a greater influence than the volume properties. The field of research is covering particle synthesis and formation, interface engineering, characterization of particles, particle interactions and structure formation and product design.

W. Peukert is member and coordinator of several research initiatives and invited plenary and keynote speaker at major international conferences.

== Honors and awards ==
- Environmental Prize of the City of Karlsruhe, 1990
- Gottfried Wilhelm Leibniz Prize, German Research Foundation, 2005
- Berlin-Brandenburg Academy of Sciences and Humanities, 2008
- Ernest Solvay Prize, 2012
- Member of the German Academy of Science and Engineering (Acatech).
- Hans Rumpf Medal 2018
