= Stefan Pfister =

German paediatric oncologist and professor

- Education: University of Hamburg; University of Tübingen (MD, 2002)
- Awards: German Cancer Award (2013); Léopold Griffuel Award (2021); Baden-Württemberg State Research Award (2022); Gottfried Wilhelm Leibniz Prize (2023); Thomas and Doris Ammann Prize (2026)
- Scientific career
- Fields: Paediatric oncology, Neurooncology
- Workplaces: German Cancer Research Center (DKFZ); Heidelberg University; Hopp Children's Cancer Center Heidelberg (KiTZ); Heidelberg University Hospital (UKHD)

Stefan Pfister is a German paediatric oncologist and professor at the Medical Faculty of Heidelberg University.

== Career ==
Pfister studied medicine at the University of Hamburg and the University of Tübingen, where he completed his doctorate in 2002. He then worked as a postdoctoral researcher at the Dana-Farber Cancer Institute at Harvard Medical School in Boston.

He completed his clinical training in paediatrics at the university hospitals in Mannheim and Heidelberg, and at the DKFZ. In 2010, he completed his habilitation in paediatrics at Heidelberg University.

Since 2012, he has headed the Division of Paediatric Neurooncology at the DKFZ. He has held a professorship at the Medical Faculty Heidelberg since 2014.

In 2016, he initiated the founding of the Hopp Children's Cancer Center Heidelberg (KiTZ), the first centre in Germany to combine childhood cancer treatment and research under one roof.

== Research ==
Pfister's research focuses on the genetic and epigenetic characterisation of childhood brain tumours. His work contributed to the development of a methylation-based classification system for brain tumours, which the World Health Organization has adopted in its official tumour classifications.

He is a member of the German National Academy of Sciences Leopoldina (elected 2020) and the European Molecular Biology Organization (elected 2022).

== Awards ==
| Year | Award | Awarding body |
|---|---|---|
| 2013 | German Cancer Award | German Cancer Society |
| 2021 | Léopold Griffuel Award | Fondation ARC |
| 2022 | Baden-Württemberg State Research Award | State of Baden-Württemberg |
| 2023 | Gottfried Wilhelm Leibniz Prize | Deutsche Forschungsgemeinschaft |
| 2026 | Thomas and Doris Ammann Prize | Thomas and Doris Ammann Foundation |
