= Christian Kurts =

German immunologist and nephrologist

Christian Kurts (born 27 November 1964 in Helmstedt, Germany) is a German immunologist and nephrologist.

== Career ==
Since 2009, Christian Kurts has been the Director Institute of Experimental Immunology, University Hospital Bonn, University of Bonn, Germany. In 2016, he founded the Bonn & Melbourne Research and Graduate training group (Bo&MeRanG) and remains a Co-Spokesperson of the Deutsche Forschungsgemeinschaft-funded program.

=== Scientific interests ===
Christian Kurts in known for publications in the fields of cross-presentation, and immune tolerance as well as his work on the function of dendritic cells in a variety of organs, with a particular focus on the urogenital tract.

=== Awards ===
In 2012, he shared the Gottfried Wilhelm Leibniz Prize with Gunther Hartmann for their "seminal discoveries concerning the mode of action of the body’s endogenous defence systems."
