= Ulrich Herbert =

German historian

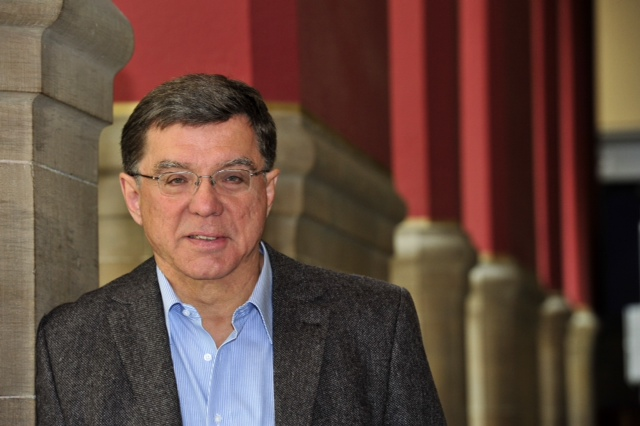
- Herbert in April 2014
- Born: 24 September 1951; Düsseldorf, Germany
- Education: University of Freiburg (teacher's certification); Universität-Gesamthochschule Essen (PhD); Fernuniversität Hagen (habilitation)
- Scientific career
- Fields: History
- Workplaces: Universität-Gesamthochschule Essen; Fernuniversität Hagen; University of Hamburg; University of Freiburg
- Thesis: (1985)
- Doctoral advisor: Lutz Niethammer
- Other academic advisors: Heinrich August Winkler

Ulrich Herbert (born 24 September 1951) is a German historian and a specialist in the Nazi era and German history during World War II.

Herbert was a professor at the University of Freiburg (Emeritus since fall 2019). In 1999 Herbert received the Gottfried Wilhelm Leibniz Prize in modern and contemporary history. He edited European history in the 20th Century, a series of ten surveys by German scholars.

== Bibliography ==
- Herbert, Ulrich (1991). A History of Foreign Labor in Germany, 1880–1980: Seasonal Workers/Forced Laborers/Guest Workers. University of Michigan Press. ISBN 978-0-472-10159-7.
- Herbert, Ulrich (1993). "LABOUR AND EXTERMINATION: ECONOMIC INTEREST AND THE PRIMACY OF WELTANSCHAUUNG IN NATIONAL SOCIALISM". Past and Present (1): 144–195. doi:10.1093/past/138.1.144. ISSN 0031-2746.
- Herbert, Ulrich (1995). "Immigration, Integration, Foreignness: Foreign Workers in Germany Since the Turn of the Century". International Labor and Working-Class History. 48: 91–93. doi:10.1017/S0147547900005354. ISSN 0147-5479.
- Herbert, Ulrich (1996). Werner Best biographische Studien über Radikalismus, Weltanschauung und Vernunft, 1903–1989 (in German). J.H.W. Dietz. p. 24. ISBN 978-3-8012-5019-5.
- Herbert, Ulrich (1997). Hitler's Foreign Workers: Enforced Foreign Labour in Germany Under the Third Reich. Cambridge University Press. ISBN 978-0-521-02530-0..
- Herbert, Ulrich (1999). "Academic and Public Discourses on the Holocaust: The Goldhagen Debate in Germany". German Politics & Society. 17 (3): 35–53. doi:10.3167/104503099782486824.
- Herbert, Ulrizh (2000). "Forced Laborers in the "Third Reich". International Labor and Working-Class History (58): 192–218. doi:10.1017/S0147547900003677. S2CID 145344942.
- Herbert, Ulrich (2000). National-socialist Extermination Policies: Contemporary German Perspectives and Controversies (in German). Berghahn Books. ISBN 978-1-57181-751-8.
- Herbert, Ulrich (2007). "Europe in High Modernity. Reflections on a Theory of the 20th Century". Journal of Modern European History. 5 (1): 5–21. doi:10.17104/1611-8944_2007_1_5. S2CID 147641844.
- Herbert, Ulrich (2016). Das Drittes Reich: Geschichte einer Diktatur (in German). C. H. Beck. ISBN 978-3-406-72240-0.
- Herbert, Ulrich (2019). A History of 20th-Century Germany. Oxford University Press. ISBN 978-0-19-007064-9.
- Herbert, Ulrich (2021). Wer waren die Nationalsozialisten? (in German). C.H. Beck. ISBN 978-3-406-76898-9.
