= Frank Bradke =

German neurobiologist

- Born: 16 October 1969; West Berlin, West Germany
- Education: Free University of Berlin (diplom); University College London (B.S.); European Molecular Biology Laboratory (Ph.D.)
- Awards: Gottfried Wilhelm Leibniz Prize (2016)
- Scientific career
- Fields: Neurobiology
- Academic advisors: Marc Tessier-Lavigne (post doc)
- Website: www.dzne.de/bradke

Frank Bradke (born 16 October 1969 in Berlin) is a German neurobiologist who works on the physiological regeneration of nerve cells in the central nervous system. In 2016, he was awarded the Gottfried Wilhelm Leibniz Prize for his "pioneering research in the field of regenerative neurobiology." He is currently a Group Leader at the German Center for Neurodegenerative Diseases. He is a member of the editorial board for Current Biology.

== Early life and education ==
Frank Bradke was born on 16 October 1969 in what was then West Berlin. From 1989 to 1995, Bradke attended a special program in which he was simultaneous enrolled as a student at the Free University of Berlin and the University College London in which he received a Diplom in Biochemistry from the German university and a Bachelor of Science in Anatomy and Developmental Biology from the British university. He was later a doctoral student at the European Molecular Biology Laboratory in Heidelberg and award a Ph.D. in biology in 1999. After receiving his doctorate, Bradke moved to the United States in 2000 to work as a postdoctoral fellow under Marc Tessier-Lavigne, first at University of California, San Francisco and later at Stanford University.

== Career ==
In 2003, Bradke returned to Germany to work at the Max Planck Institute of Neurobiology in Martinsried. In 2011, Bradke moved to the University of Bonn.
