= Manfred Pinkal =

German computational linguist

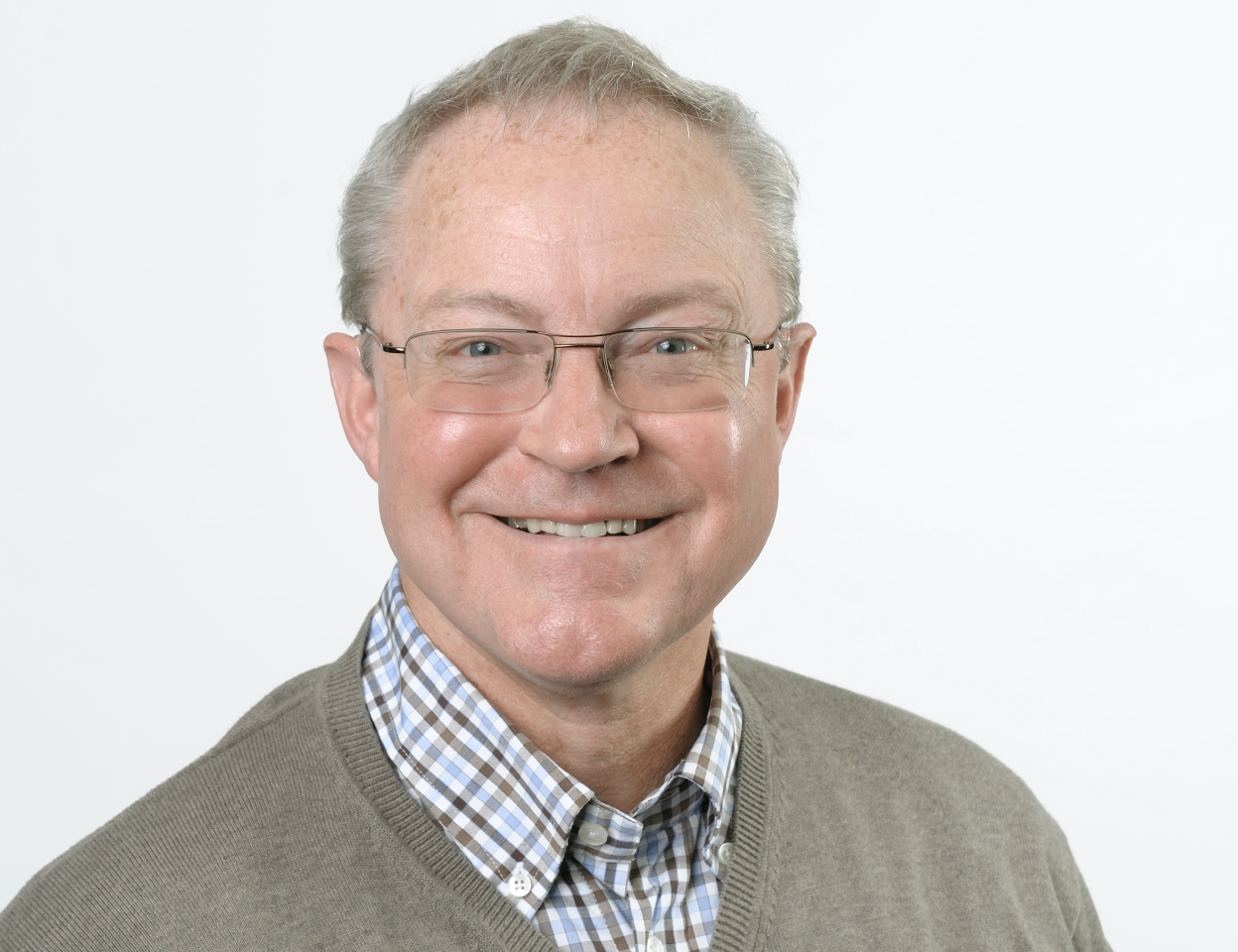
- Born: 24 August 1949 (age 77); Dortmund, West Germany
- Education: University of Stuttgart
- Awards: Leibniz Prize
- Scientific career
- Fields: Computational Linguistics
- Workplaces: Saarland University

Manfred Pinkal (born 24 August 1949) is a German computational linguist. He is a senior professor at the Saarland University.

== Education and career ==
Manfred Pinkal studied Linguistics, Philosophy, German Language and Literature, and Computer Science at the University of Bochum and University of Stuttgart. He received his Ph.D. in Linguistics from the University of Stuttgart.

== Research ==
Pinkal’s work is centered around representation and processing of natural-language meaning, both in the frameworks of truth-conditional and distributional semantics, with a special focus on vagueness, ambiguity, and the interaction of meaning and context. Since 1990, he is teaching as a professor of Computational Linguistics at Saarland University. He was co-founder and principal investigator of two Collaborative Research Centers and founding speaker of the International Post-Graduate College “Language Technology and Cognitive Systems” of German Science Foundation (DFG). Since 2007, he has been deputy director of the Cluster of Excellence “Multi-Modal Computing and Interaction” (MMCI).

== Awards and honors ==
Pinkal was the first computational linguist to win the Gottfried Wilhelm Leibniz Prize. He is member of the Akademie der Wissenschaften und der Literatur at Mainz.
