= Lutz Raphael =

German historian and historiographer (born 1955)

Lutz Raphael (born 12 September 1955) is a German historian and historiographer. He is a professor at the University of Trier.

== Life ==
Lutz Raphael was born in Essen. He studied History, Romance studies, Philosophy and Sociology at Münster and Paris between 1974 and 1984. It was at Münster that he received his doctorate with a doctorate entitled "Partei und Gewerkschaft" on the trades union strategies of the Communist Parties in Italy and France since 1970. Between 1987 and 1996 he was employed as an academic research assistant at TU Darmstadt. In 1994 his habilitation, received from the TU, opened the way to a lifelong academic career. His dissertation, this time, was entitled "The successors of Bloch and Febvre. Annales-historiography and 'Nouvelle histoire' in France (1945–1980)" ("Die Erben von Bloch und Febvre. Annales-Historiographie und nouvelle histoire in Frankreich 1945–1980"). In 1996 he became Professor of Modern and Contemporary History at Trier, a position he has retained (2018) for more than twenty years.

Raphael served as a member of the German Council of Science and Humanities between 2007 and 2013. He was a Leibniz Prize winner in 2013. Since 2014 he has been a member of the Mainz-based Academy of Sciences and Literature. During 2015/2016 he was the Gerda Henkel Visiting Professor at the German Historical Institute London.

== Output (selection) ==
- 1984 Partei und Gewerkschaft. Die Gewerkschaftsstrategien der kommunistischen Parteien Italiens und Frankreichs seit 1970, Münster 1984.
- 1993 Le Centre de recherches historiques de 1949 à 1975 (Cahiers du Centre de Recherches Historiques 10 Avril 1993) Paris 1993.
- 1994 Die Erben von Bloch und Febvre. Annales-Historiographie und nouvelle histoire in Frankreich 1945−1980, Stuttgart 1994.
- 2000 Recht und Ordnung. Herrschaft durch Verwaltung im 19. Jahrhundert (in Europa), Frankfurt/Main 2000.
- 2003 Geschichtswissenschaft im Zeitalter der Extreme. Hauptwerke und Hauptströmungen von 1900 bis zur Gegenwart, München 2003.
- 2010 together with Anselm Doering-Manteuffel, Nach dem Boom. Perspektiven der Zeitgeschichte nach 1970, Göttingen 2008, 2nd enlarged edition 2010.
- 2010 Ilaria Porciani/Lutz Raphael, Atlas of European Historiography. The Making of a Profession 1800−2005, Houndmills, Basingstoke 2010.
- 2011 Imperiale Gewalt und mobilisierte Nation, Europa 1914−1945, München 2011.

An exceptionally high proportion of collaboratively produced work is listed.
