= Vasilis Ntziachristos =

Greek American engineer, scientist, and inventor

- Education: Aristotle University of Thessaloniki (Diploma); University of Pennsylvania (MSc, PhD)
- Known for: Optoacoustic imaging and sensing
- Awards: Member of the Leopoldina (2024); Karl Heinz Beckurts Prize (2021); ECS Innovation Award, European Union, Horizon Europe Program (2021); Gold Medal Award of the World Molecular Imaging Society (WMIS, 2015); DFG Gottfried Wilhelm Leibniz Prize (2013)
- Scientific career
- Fields: Imaging, Microscopy, Optoacoustics, Photonics, Clinical Translation, Computational Methods, Biomedical Engineering, Bioengineering, Machine Learning, Data Analytics
- Workplaces: Technical University of Munich; Helmholtz Munich

Vasilis Ntziachristos is a Greek-American biomedical engineer, scientist and inventor known for developing foundational fluorescence and optoacoustic imaging and sensing technologies for biological and medical applications. He is Professor of Medicine and Electrical Engineering at the Technical University of Munich, where he holds the Chair of Biological Imaging. He is also the Director of the Institute of Biological and Medical Imaging and the Director of Bioengineering at Helmholtz Munich.

== Education ==
Ntziachristos studied Electrical and Computer Engineering at the Aristotle University of Thessaloniki, earning a Diploma degree. He continued his training as a Research Fellow at the Panum Institute, NMR Center of the University of Copenhagen and as a Visiting Scholar in Radiology at the University of Pennsylvania. He completed an M.Sc. (1998) and a Ph.D. (2000) in Bioengineering at the University of Pennsylvania. His doctoral work was carried out under the supervision of Britton Chance, Arjun Yodh and Mitchell Schnall, and focused on integrating magnetic resonance and optical imaging. This work received several distinctions and awards, including the Solomon R. Pollack Awards for Excellence in Graduate Bioengineering Research, from the University of Pennsylvania.

== Career ==
Following his PhD, Ntziachristos joined Harvard Medical School and Massachusetts General Hospital as an Instructor in 2001, becoming Assistant Professor and Director of the Laboratory for Bio-Optics and Molecular Imaging in 2002. In 2007, he was recruited jointly by the Technical University of Munich and Helmholtz Munich to develop biological and medical imaging teaching and research programs, where he holds a Full Professor (C4/W3) position.

== Leadership and institutional roles ==
Ntziachristos has held several major leadership positions across European research institutions. He has been an ardent promoter of Bioengineering activities across the Munich academic ecosystem, playing a foundational role at establishing the Munich School of Bioengineering, now known as the Munich Institute of Biomedical Engineering, MIBE, an interdisciplinary research institute at TUM for Bioengineering research and the central research institute for translational cancer research TranslaTUM, where he serves on the Board of Directors. He has also been a founding member of the Center for Bioengineering at Helmholtz Munich, where he serves as its director and of the Helmholtz Pioneer Campus, a research institute focusing on metabolic health, where he serves as director of bioengineering. Ntziachristos has also served (2023 - 2025) as Director of the Institute of Electronic Structure and Laser (IESL) at the Foundation for Research & Technology – Hellas (FORTH), where he spearheaded the foundation of the Center for Quantum Science and Technologies.

Beyond the institutional leadership roles, Ntziachristos has contributed to the establishment and direction of several major research programs at both TUM and Helmholtz Munich, with a focus on advancing bioengineering and biological imaging and sensing technologies across the European research landscape. In the area of scientific publishing, he founded and served as Editor-in-Chief of Photoacoustics (Elsevier) from 2009 to 2017. Photoacoustics is the only peer-reviewed journal dedicated entirely to photoacoustic / optoacoustic research. He has also served as Associate Editor for Optics Letters and IEEE Transactions on Medical Imaging. Ntziachristos also plays an active role in shaping research policy and promoting the visibility of optics, photonics and bioengineering, including service in advisory councils for the Greek government, organizing international conferences on biooptics, imaging and articulating a compelling vision of bioengineering as the translation engine for medical applications.

== Research ==
Ntziachristos is an internationally recognized researcher in biomedical imaging. A major focus of his work is on developing fluorescence molecular imaging technologies to support surgical and endoscopic procedures, with the aim of improving cancer detection and clinical outcome. In 2011, he and his collaborators published a translational study in which a targeted fluorescent agent was administered to patients to help distinguish tumor from healthy tissue during surgery. This approach is now being validated in several clinical studies. In 2012, Ntziachristos co-founded SurgVision BV, a company developing fluorescence-guided systems for surgery, which was acquired by Bracco Imaging S.p.A. in 2017. More recently his team has demonstrated improved early cancer detection of esophageal cancer compared with white-light microscopy, with potential implications for earlier treatment and significant healthcare cost savings.

Another major focus of his research involves the development of optoacoustic imaging technologies designed to offer a breakthrough in optical imaging of tissues and cells. His team works on theoretical and applied development of novel methodologies for non-invasive optoacoustic imaging and sensing and their translation to the benefit of the patient. Among various contributions, he is the inventor of multispectral optoacoustic tomography (MSOT) and raster-scan optoacoustic mesoscopy (RSOM), two non-invasive imaging approaches that enable simultaneous measurement of different physiological and pathological tissue parameters, offering new possibilities for disease early detection and treatment monitoring. MSOT and RSOM have been applied in preclinical and clinical studies examining conditions such as psoriasis, breast tumors, metastatic melanoma, and inflammation in Crohn’s disease, as well as metabolic activity in brown‑fat tissue. Optoacoustic systems based on these technologies are in use in research and clinical environments in various locations worldwide and accounted in 2025 for 55% of all worldwide ongoing optoacoustic studies in humans. Ntziachristos is also the founder of Spear UG, and co-founder of sThesis GmbH and Maurus OY, companies that commercialize optoacoustic technologies. He is also a co-founder of i3 Inc., which develops intravascular imaging technologies.

Other notable developments from his research work include the development of the world’s smallest ultrasound detector, label-free microscopy using mid-infrared optoacoustics, and the development of a next-generation sensor that reads glucose non-invasively from blood, within tissues.

== Awards and honours ==
Ntziachristos has received numerous international awards, including the Gottfried Wilhelm Leibniz Prize (2013), the Gold Medal of the World Molecular Imaging Society (2015), the Karl Heinz Beckurts Prize (2021), the Blaise Pascal International Chair Award (2019), and the GO-Bio Award of the Federal Ministry of Education and Research (Germany). He is the recipient of two ERC Advanced Grants (2008, 2015) and ERC PoC Award, the 2014 Germany’s Innovation Prize, the Erwin Schrödinger Prize (2011), and was named to the MIT TR100 list of top innovators in 2004. The 2018 anniversary report of the Technical University of Munich features a chapter on Vasilis Ntziachristos, naming him as one of the professors that have shaped the Technical University of Munich. He was elected a member of the German National Academy of Sciences Leopoldina. and of the Bavarian Academy of Sciences and Humanities in 2026. In the same year, he received the Future Insight Prize from Merck for his contributions to non-invasive health sensing.

== Selected publications ==
- Karlas, Angelos; Pleitez, Miguel A.; Aguirre, Juan; Ntziachristos, Vasilis (2021). "Optoacoustic imaging in endocrinology and metabolism". Nature Reviews Endocrinology. 17 (6): 323–335. doi:10.1038/s41574-021-00482-5.
- Shnaiderman, Rami; Wissmeyer, Georg; Ülgen, Okan; Mustafa, Qutaiba; Chmyrov, Andriy; Ntziachristos, Vasilis (2020). "A submicrometre silicon-on-insulator resonator for ultrasound detection". Nature. 585: 372–378. doi:10.1038/s41586-020-2685-y.
- Omar, Murad; Aguirre, Juan; Ntziachristos, Vasilis (2019). "Optoacoustic mesoscopy for biomedicine". Nature Biomedical Engineering. 3 (5): 354–370. doi:10.1038/s41551-019-0377-4.
- Pleitez, Miguel A.; Khan, Asrar Ali; Soldà, Alice; Chmyrov, Andriy; Reber, Josefine; Gasparin, Francesca; Seeger, Markus R.; Schätz, Benedikt; Herzig, Stephan; Scheideler, Marcel; Ntziachristos, Vasilis (2020). "Label-free metabolic imaging by mid-infrared optoacoustic microscopy in living cells". Nature Biotechnology. 38 (3): 293–296. doi:10.1038/s41587-019-0359-9.
- Koch, Maximilian; Symvoulidis, Panagiotis; Ntziachristos, Vasilis (2018). "Tackling standardization in fluorescence molecular imaging". Nature Photonics. 12: 505–515. doi:10.1038/s41566-018-0225-8.
