= Peter Greil =

German materials scientist

Peter Greil is a German materials scientist. He received the Gottfried Wilhelm Leibniz Prize in 2000. He has been a full professor, as well as Chair of the Institute of Glass and Ceramics, at the Friedrich–Alexander University of Erlangen–Nuremberg since 1993.
