= Lars T. Angenent =

Dutch microbiologist

- Born: 1969 (age 56–57); Netherlands
- Spouse: Ruth E. Ley

Academic background
- Education: BS, Environmental Sciences, M.S. Environmental Technology/Microbiology, Wageningen University and Research; PhD, Environmental Engineering, 1998, Iowa State University
- Thesis: Development of a new high-rate anaerobic process for the treatment of industrial and domestic wastewaters: the anaerobic migrating blanket reactor (AMBR) (1998)
- Website: envbiotech.de

Largus Theodora Angenent (born 1969) is a Dutch environmental biotechnologist. He is a Humboldt Professorship in applied microbiology at the University of Tübingen, Germany's largest monetary international research prize.

== Early life and education ==
Angenent was born in 1969. He completed his Bachelor of Science degree and Master's degree from Wageningen University and Research in the Netherlands. Following this, he traveled to the United States and enrolled at Iowa State University for his doctorate degree.

== Career ==
Upon completing his post-doctoral research at the University of Colorado, Boulder, Angenent accepted an assistant professor position at Washington University in St. Louis. After his wife, microbial ecologist Ruth E. Ley, joined him in the city they conducted a dual career job search before settling on Cornell University. As an associate professor of biological and environmental engineering, Angenent and his laboratory researchers began harnessing microbes to produce liquid fuel from the gases produced by slow pyrolysis. A few years later, he was the recipient of a State University of New York Chancellor's Awards for Excellence in Professional Service for 2015.

In 2016, Angenent was appointed a Humboldt Professorship in applied microbiology at the University of Tübingen, Germany's largest monetary international research prize. In his first academic year in this role, Angenent sought to recycle waste with the ultimate aim of creating a sustainable cycle of materials. He developed a bioprocess that enables the conversion of acid whey without the use of additional chemicals. During the COVID-19 pandemic, Angenent began investigating how proteins can be produced without the need for animal husbandry or crop cultivation.
