= Frank Vollertsen =

German scientist

Frank Vollertsen (born 13 August 1958) is a German scientist. From 2003 to 2021 he was director of the "Bremer Institut für angewandte Strahltechnik" (BIAS).

He is the recipient of the Gottfried Wilhelm Leibniz Prize, awarded by the Deutsche Forschungsgemeinschaft (German Research Foundation) in 2002.
