= Thomas Bauer (Arabist) =

German Arabist and Islamic studies scholar

Thomas Jürgen Bauer is a German Arabist and Islamic studies scholar.

== Works ==
- A Culture of Ambiguity: An Alternative History of Islam
