= Ana Pombo =

- Education: University of Lisbon, Portugal University of Oxford, UK
- Awards: 2025 Gottfried Wilhelm Leibniz Prize (DFG) 2007 Robert Feulgen Prize (Society for Histochemistry) 1998-2002 Royal Society Dorothy Hodgkin Fellowship (The Royal Society) 1997-2000 Hayward Junior Research Fellowship (Oriel College, Univ. Oxford)
- Scientific career
- Workplaces: MRC Laboratory of Medical Sciences, London, UK Imperial College London, UK BIMSB at MDC, Berlin, Germany Humboldt University of Berlin, Germany Johns Hopkins University, Baltimore, MD, US

Ana Pombo is a Research Professor at Johns Hopkins University, Krieger School of Arts & Sciences, Department of Biology, and a group leader at the Max Delbrück Center for Molecular Medicine (MDC). Since May 2018, Pombo is an elected member of the European Molecular Biology Organization (EMBO).

== Early education ==
From 1988–1992, Pombo did her Bachelor of Science as well as her Master of Science in Biochemistry at the University of Lisbon. In 1998, Pombo graduated with a DPhil (Physiological Sciences) from the Sir William Dunn School of Pathology, University of Oxford, where she described transcription factories in the mammalian nucleus.

== Research and career ==
From 1998 to 2002, Pombo was a Royal Society Dorothy Hodgkin Fellow at the Sir William Dunn School of Pathology, University of Oxford. In 2000, Pombo started her own research group at the MRC London Institute for Medical Sciences, Imperial College London. From April 2012 till March 2015, she was a full professor (0.2 FTE) in Cell Biology of the Institute of Clinical Sciences (ICS) at the Imperial College London. In 2013, Pombo moved her lab to Berlin, becoming a senior group leader at the Berlin Institute for Medical Systems Biology (BIMSB) at the Max Delbrück Center for Molecular Medicine (MDC) in Berlin-Buch with the focus on "Epigenetic Regulation and Chromatin Architecture". From April 2013 till February 2025, she was Professor (W3) of Biology at Humboldt University. Her research aims to characterize the interaction between gene regulation and genome architecture, to determine the underlying rules and principles of functional genes.

== Awards and honours ==
- 2025: Gottfried Wilhelm Leibniz Prize
- 2018: member of the European Molecular Biology Organization (EMBO)
- 2007: Robert Feulgen Prize, Society for Histochemistry
- 1998–2002: Royal Society Dorothy Hodgkin Fellowship
- 1997–2000: Hayward Junior Research Fellowship, Oriel College, Oxford
- 1994–1997: PhD scholarship, Junta Nacional para a Investigação Científica e Tecnológica
