= Heinz Maier-Leibnitz-Preis =

Award for young researchers, conferred by the German Research Foundation

The Heinz Maier-Leibnitz-Preis (Heinz Maier-Leibnitz Prize), in honor and memory of the German physicist Heinz Maier-Leibnitz, is funded by the Bundesministerium für Bildung und Forschung (BMBF, German Ministry of Education and Research), and it is awarded by a selection committee appointed by the Deutsche Forschungsgemeinschaft (DFG, German Research Foundation) and the BMBF. Since 2013, there are ten recipients of the prize and each receives €20,000, which is an increase over the original 16,000 Euros that had been given to six recipients per year until 2012. Since 2021, the prize money has been increased to 200,000 Euros.

Nominees for the award may be put forward by:

- Members of the DFG Review Boards
- Research universities of the Federal Republic of Germany
- The Union der deutschen Akademien der Wissenschaften (Union of the German Academies of Sciences and Humanities)
- The Max Planck Society
- The Helmholtz Association of German Research Centres
- The Fraunhofer Society
- The Gottfried Wilhelm Leibniz Scientific Community

== See also ==
- List of physics awards
