= Center for Integrated Protein Science Munich =

Educational centers in Munich, Germany

- Type: public
- Established: November 1, 2006
- Endowment: EUR 45 million
- Provost: Thomas Carell (speaker of the board)
- Director: Oliver Baron (CEO)
- Administrative staff: ca. 800
- Location: Munich, Bavaria, Federal Republic of Germany
- Website: www.cipsm.de

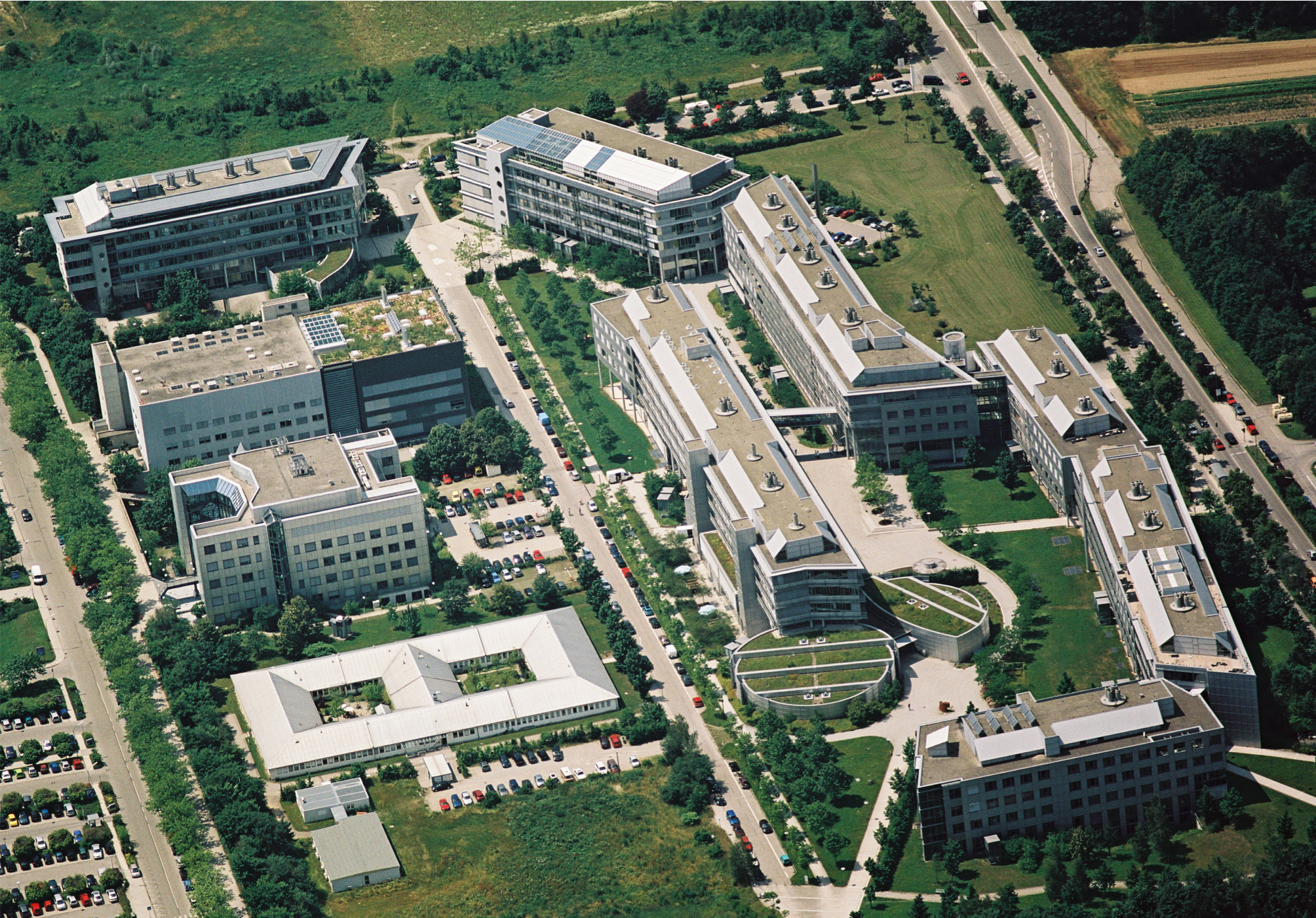
Main building of CIPS^{M} in Munich (center)

The Center for Integrated Protein Science Munich (CIPS^{M}) is a cluster of excellence in sciences located in Munich. It is an association of research groups of LMU Munich, the Technical University of Munich, the Helmholtz Center Munich, and the Max Planck Institutes of biochemistry and neurobiology in Martinsried. Research at the center expands from isolated proteins up to proteins in living organisms applying methods of biophysics, biochemistry, medicine, and biology.

== Goals ==
Proteins are as biological macromolecules a cornerstone of life. However, their functional importance and structural effects are not yet fully understood in every detail. Investigation of isolated proteins up to living organisms (e.g. zebra fish, Drosophilidae, Caenorhabditis elegans or escherichia coli bacteries), especially with regard to interactions, structural complexities (e.g. protein folding, structures of protein complexes, interactions between proteins and nucleic acids, and manipulation of protein functions) and neuro-degenerative diseases, promises to furnish basic knowledge of these macromolecules. This very knowledge could contribute to advances in biomedicine and biotechnologies.

== Organization ==
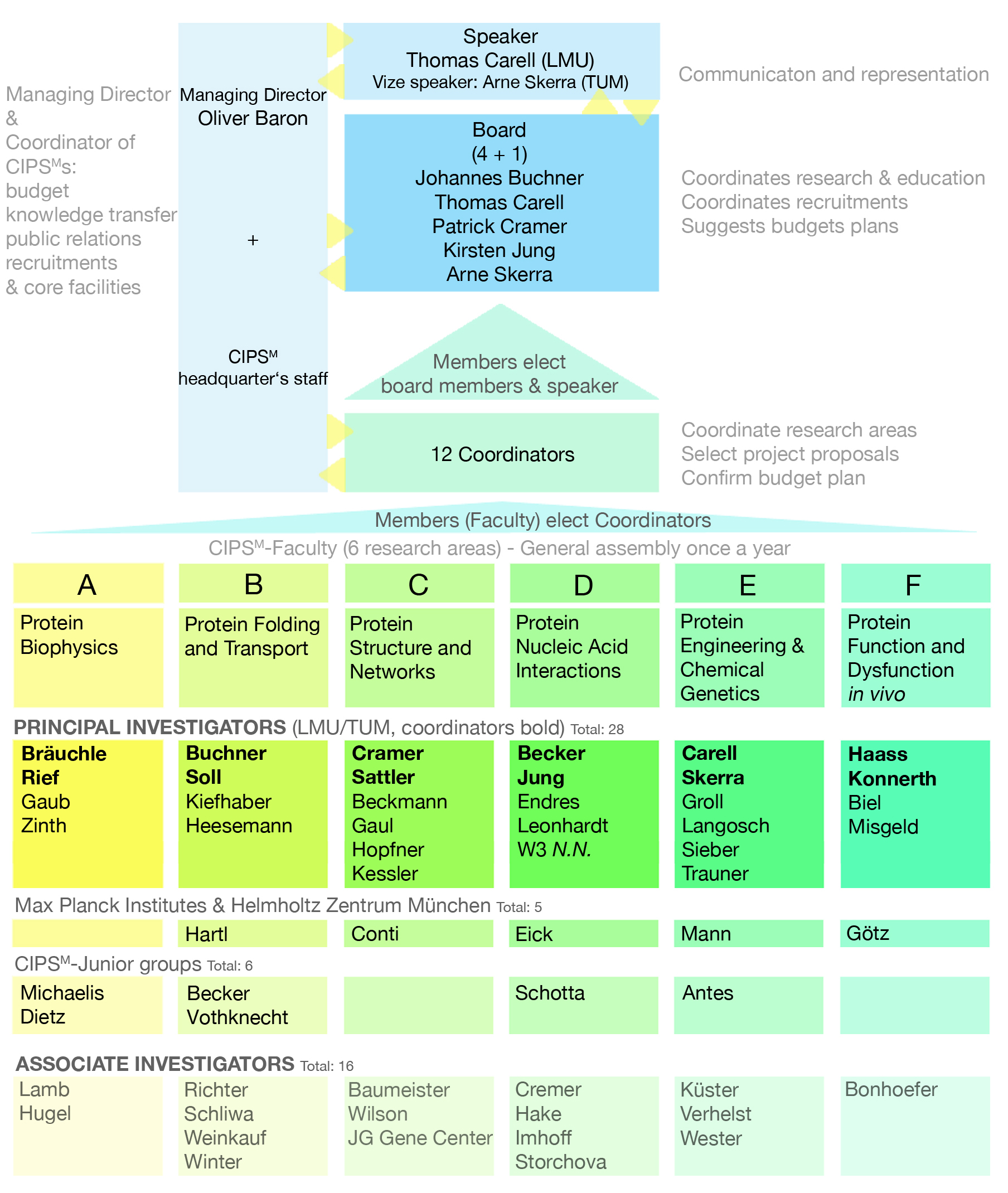
Organigram of CIPS^{M}

The cluster is divided into six main areas of research.

Main areas of research in CIPS^{M} (coordinators in bold font):
Research Area	Topic	Principal Investigators	Junior Groups	Associate Professors
A	Protein Biophysics	**Rief, Bräuchle,** Zinth, Gaub	Michaelis, Dietz	Lamb, Hugel
B	Protein Folding and Transport	**Buchner, Soll,** Kiefhaber, Heesemann, Hartl	Becker, Vothknecht	Richter, Schliwa, Weinkauf, Winter
C	Protein Structure and Networks	**Cramer, Sattler,** Hopfner, Beckmann, Sattler, Kessler, Conti		Baumeister, Wilson
D	Protein Nucleic Acid Interactions	**Becker, Jung,** Endres, Leonhardt, Eick	Schotta	Cremer, Hake, Imhoff, Storchowa
E	Protein Engineering and Chemical Genetics	**Carell, Skerra,** Langosch, Groll, Trauner, Sieber, Mann	Antes	Küster, Wester, Verhelst
F	Protein Function and Dysfunction in vivo	**Haass, Konnerth,** Biel, Götz, Misgeld		Bonhoefer

Each research area (A-F) is being represented by two coordinators who, in cooperation with the executive board, decide on the appointment of new professorships and elect the executive board of four researchers and one member responsible for family and gender support. The main responsibilities of the board members are research, teaching and support of junior academic staff. The board members represent the interests of the cluster towards the directorate of the respective university. The speaker of the board and his deputy take special care of the supervision and recruitment of junior professorships. Research group leaders (principal and associate investigators) meet annually to decide on budget allocation. Leading the research group still is the individual task of the research group leader at own responsibility. Regular meetings between group leaders and coordinators ensure efficient guidance of the cluster. The speaker represents the cluster and thus negotiates with the universities participating in the cluster of excellence on matters like teaching as well as on financial and personal issues. Administration and supervision of financial endorsements of each fiscal year, personal recruitment, management of all cluster issues, procurement of larger tools, and organizing activities such as symposia, conferences and workshops (see Events and Conferences) are part of the job of the cluster CEO, who further takes care of applications and publicity work.

== Gender Support Program ==
Female scientists of CIPS^{M} are supported by a program called AFF (Ausschuss für Familien- und Frauenförderung; committee for family and gender support). The program was created to get more researchers with children and habilitated females into professorships or leading positions. The committee is being led by a member of the board who is especially responsible for family and gender support. The support program is intended to counter barriers in the academic career resulting from parental leave. For this purpose, junior researchers with child or children can be allocated a technical assistant for support of their research. Furthermore, a domestic aid can be granted on request. For researchers' children up to the age of three years, CIPS^{M} runs its own day nursery. Additionally, a mentoring program was created to support successful employment of female scientists and symposia with high ranking female scientists should give researchers opportunities to obtain insight into careers, gain experiences and enhance scientific interaction.

== Endowment ==
Financial endorsements of CIPS^{M} are provided by the Federal Republic of Germany, the states of Germany and the Deutsche Forschungsgemeinschaft in the course of the German Universities Excellence Initiative and distributed oriented on demand.

Distribution of CIPS^{M} financial endowments of fiscal year 2009; taken from official data
1. A (10.0%)
2. B (12.0%)
3. C (12.0%)
4. D (12.0%)
5. E (13.0%)
6. F (10.0%)
7. Gender Support (5.00%)
8. Management (4.00%)
9. Indirect Costs TUM (6.00%)
10. Indirect Costs LMU (11.0%)

Individual financial support of scientists of the cluster includes project-related funding of PhD and Postdoc positions, procurement of larger tools, financial support of events and conferences, and gender support.

== Research highlights and achievements ==
The CIPS^{M} cluster has been elected landmark in the German "country of ideas" initiative honoring the achievements of CIPS^{M} researchers, who have been awarded several prizes for their work conducted with CIPS^{M}:

- Thomas Carell received the Otto-Bayer-Prize 2008 of the Bayer Science & Education Foundation.
- Patrick Cramer has been awarded the Philip Morris Research Prize for the detailed elucidation of the RNA polymerase II structure in 2007.
- Magdalena Götz received the Gottfried Wilhelm Leibniz Prize 2007 of the Deutsche Forschungsgemeinschaft in recognition of her work in the area of brain development.
- Elena Conti received the Gottfried Wilhelm Leibniz Prize 2008 of the Deutsche Forschungsgemeinschaft for "fundamentally new knowledge of intracellular RNA transport and of RNA metabolism" together with Elisa Izaurralde of Max Planck Institute of Developmental Biology Tübingen.
- Stephan Sieber and Thomas Böttcher have been rewarded the Innovationspreis der BioRegionen in Deutschland 2008 for their research on beta-lactones for the treatment of diseases, which are resistant to common antibiotics.
- Horst Kessler has been awarded the Josef Rudinger Award of the European Peptide Society for his contributions to peptide chemistry in 2008.
- Heinrich Leonhardt has received the Binder Innovation Award for the development of fluorescent antigen-bonding nanobodies, which can be expressed in living cells, in 2008.
- Thomas Cremer has been awarded the 2009 Schleiden Medal of the German Academy of Sciences Leopoldina in honor of his work in the area of nucleus architecture.

Furthermore, the German Federal Ministry of Education and Research supports the cooperation "experimental and theoretical methods for dissecting the dynamics of epigenetic gene silencing in living cells" between the CIPS^{M} groups Leonhardt and Schotta and the University of Heidelberg.

== Events and conferences ==
- Graduate School Life Science Munich (LSM): An international support program for extraordinary Diploma or Master absolvents in the field of anthropology, biochemistry, cell biology, ecology, evolution, genetics, microbiology, plant sciences, systematics, and zoology including lectures, seminars and workshops.
- CIPS^{M}-Harvard Young Scientists' Forum (YSF): An annual meeting on a CIPS^{M} initiative for interdisciplinary exchange between PhD students and Postdocs of Harvard University and LMU Munich.
- CIPS^{M} gala in the Deutsches Museum on May 4, 2009, in course of the "country of ideas" initiative with lectures about current highlights of the cluster's protein research.
- Elmau Conference 2008 and Monastery Irsee Conference 2009: Conferences on current topics in protein research in cooperation with Bayer Schering Pharma AG.
- CIPS^{M} lecture of Prof. Martina Havenith in course of the Gender Support Program (2009).
- Alpenforum 2009: CIPS^{M} has been supporting the "Alpenforum" of the GDCh young scientists Munich since 2008. The forum is held annually in Oberammergau to give students and doctorands of chemistry and related sciences the chance to collect information on possible careers in chemistry, to get into contact with companies and to get to know interesting employers.
- FRAU 2.0 "frau & mutter & wissenschaftlerin wie geht das überhaupt?" (Woman 2.0 "woman & mother & scientist how can this work?" 2009): information event for students of sciences, especially chemistry, biology and pharmacy, on possible careers and perspectives for female scientists at LMU Munich in course of the Gender Support Program.
- CIPS^{M} Trainees' Minisymposium: Lecture and discussion event at the Technical University of Munich on trends and novel developments in protein sciences.
- Synthesefest: lecture event at LMU Munich on organic chemistry with international lecturers of science and industry.
- in course of the lecture series „Innovation Management and Global Challenges“ (November 2009 to January 2010), Dr. Wolfang Plischke, member of the Bayer AG board of management, has been invited to lecture and thus give master and PhD students insight into how their research might impact on the chemical industry.

Furthermore, the CIPS^{M} cluster organized

- the Chromatin Assembly and Inheritance of Functional States, 2nd Transregio 5 Symposium (2007),
- the European Cooperation in the Field of Scientific and Technical Research "COST Meeting" (2008),
- the EMBO Workshop "Gene Transduction in Yeast" (2008),
- the 16th Lecture Conference ORCHEM 2008 in cooperation with the Gesellschaft Deutscher Chemiker and the Liebig-Vereinigung für Chemie,
- the 4th International Conference on the Hsp90 Chaperone Machine (2008).

== Science Comment ==
The project Science Comment has been established in 2009 to comment objectively on and to discuss publications in well reputed scientific journals of chemistry, biology, pharmacy and medicine. This internet forum was intended to facilitate international communication of research results. The registered user can, referring to a certain publication, criticise or discuss this publication in public. Science Comment serves its purpose as data base for the quality assessment of a publicized result prior to its application. The possibility to check the feasibility of the result saves the users' time and resources.
