= Ernst Schering Prize =

German science and technology award

- Description: Award for outstanding basic research in the fields of medicine, biology or chemistry
- Country: Germany
- Presented by: Ernst Schering Foundation
- Website: https://scheringstiftung.de/en/programm/lebenswissenschaften/ernst-schering-preis

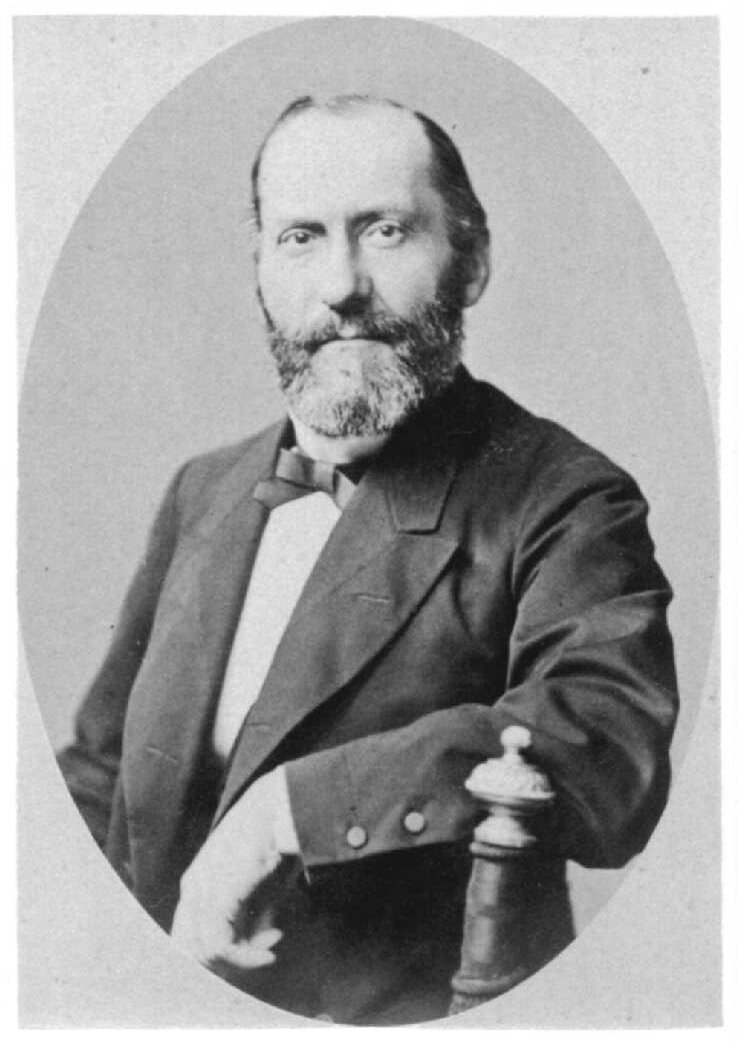
Ernst Schering

The Ernst Schering Prize is awarded annually by the Ernst Schering Foundation for especially outstanding basic research in the fields of medicine, biology or chemistry anywhere in the world. Established in 1991 by the Ernst Schering Research Foundation, and named after the German apothecary and industrialist, Ernst Christian Friedrich Schering, who founded the Schering Corporation, the prize is now worth €50,000.

== Recipients ==
Source: Schering Foundation

- 1992 Peter H. Seeburg, (Center for Molecular Biology, University of Heidelberg, Germany)
- 1993 Christiane Nüsslein-Volhard, (Max Planck Institute for Developmental Biology in Tübingen, Germany)
- 1994 Bert Vogelstein, (Oncology Center, Johns Hopkins University, Baltimore, Maryland, US)
- 1995 Yasutomi Nishizuka, (Kobe University, Japan)
- 1996 Judah Folkman, (Harvard Medical School, Harvard University, Boston, US)
- 1997 Johann Mulzer, (Institute for Organic Chemistry, University of Vienna, Austria)
- 1998 Ilme Schlichting, (Max Planck Institute for Molecular Physiology in Dortmund, Germany)
- 1999 Michael Berridge, (Babraham Institute in Cambridge, UK)
- 2000 Takao Shimizu, (University of Tokyo, Japan)
- 2001 Kyriacos Nicolaou, (University of California, San Diego, California, and The Scripps Research Institute, La Jolla, California, US)
- 2002 Ian Wilmut, (The Roslin Institute in Edinburgh, UK)
- 2003 Svante Pääbo, (Max Planck Institute for Evolutionary Anthropology in Leipzig, Germany)
- 2004 Ronald McKay, (National Institute of Neurological Disorders and Stroke (NINDS), Bethesda, Maryland, US)
- 2005 Thomas Tuschl, (Laboratory of RNA Molecular Biology, Rockefeller University, New York)
- 2006 Wolfgang Baumeister, (Max Planck Institute of Biochemistry in Martinsried, Germany)
- 2007 Carolyn Bertozzi, (University of California, Berkeley, US)
- 2008 Klaus Rajewsky, (Harvard Medical School, Boston, US)
- 2009 Rudolf Jaenisch, (Whitehead Institute, Cambridge, Massachusetts, US)
- 2010 Marc Feldmann and Sir Ravinder Maini, (Kennedy Institute of Rheumatology at Imperial College London, UK)
- 2011 Bert W. O'Malley, (Tom Thompson Distinguished Service Professor and Chair of Molecular and Cellular Biology at Baylor College of Medicine in Houston, Texas)
- 2012 Matthias Mann, (Max Planck Institute of Biochemistry in Martinsried, Germany)
- 2013 Frank Kirchhoff, (Institute of Molecular Virology at the Ulm University Medical Center in Ulm, Germany)
- 2014 Magdalena Götz, (Director of the Institute of Stem Cell Research at the Helmholtz Zentrum München and chair of Physiological Genomics at LMU Munich in Germany)
- 2015 David MacMillan, (Professor of Chemistry at Princeton University, US).
- 2016 Franz-Ulrich Hartl, (Max Planck Institute of Biochemistry in Martinsried, Germany).
- 2017 Elly Tanaka, (Senior Scientist at Research Institute of Molecular Pathology in Vienna, Austria)
- 2018 Bonnie L. Bassler, (Princeton University, New Jersey)
- 2019 Patrick Cramer, (Director at the Max Planck Institute for Biophysical Chemistry in Göttingen)
- 2020 Jens Claus Brüning, (Director at the Max Planck Institute for Metabolism Research in Cologne)
- 2021 Aviv Regev, (Head of Genentech Research and Early Development in South San Francisco, US)
- 2022 Gisbert Schneider (Professor of Computer-Assisted Drug Design at the Institute of Pharmaceutical Sciences at ETH Zurich and director of the Singapore-ETH Center)
- 2023 Matthias Tschöp (CEO and scientific director at Helmholtz Zentrum München, Germany. Alexander von Humboldt Professor at the Technical University of Munich (TUM), and Helmholtz Vice President of Health Research)
- 2024 Maiken Nedergaard (Dean's Professor and Co-Director of the Center for Translational Neuromedicine at the University of Rochester Medical Center in Rochester, NY, and Professor of Glial Cell Biology at the Center for Neuroscience at the University of Copenhagen in Denmark)
- 2025 Volker Haucke (director at the Leibniz-Forschungsinstitut für Molekulare Pharmakologie (FMP) and professor at Freie Universität Berlin

== See also ==
- List of biology awards
- List of biochemistry awards
- List of chemistry awards
- List of medicine awards
