= Matthias Tschöp =

German neuroendocrinologist (born 1967)

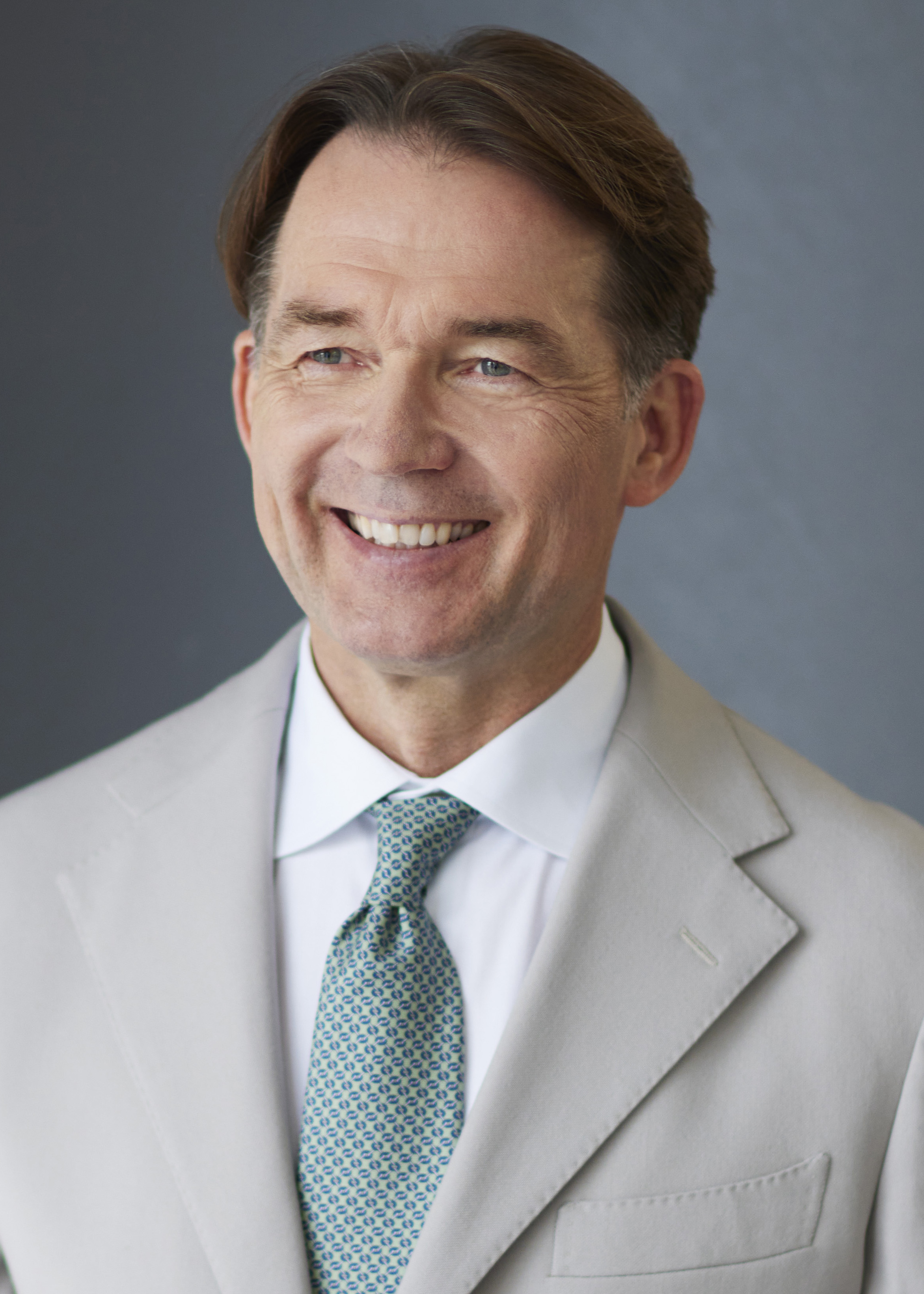
- Born: 7 April 1967 (age 59); Munich, Germany
- Education: LMU Munich
- Known for: Discovery of highly effective drugs for obesity and diabetes
- Awards: Banting Medal (2023); EASD-Centennial Prize (2022); Ernst Jung Prize (2021); Paul Langerhans Medal (2019); Carus Medal (2017); Hansen Family Prize (2017); Erwin Schrödinger Prize (2014); Paul Martini Prize (2014); Outstanding Scientific Achievement Award, American Diabetes Association (2011); Scientific Achievement Award, The Obesity Society (2007)
- Scientific career
- Fields: Biomedicine
- Workplaces: LMU Munich; Helmholtz Zentrum München; Technical University of Munich

Matthias Hans Tschöp (born 7 April 1967) is a German physician and scientist. He is the President of LMU Munich. He previously was Chief Executive Officer and Scientific Director of Helmholtz Zentrum München, and Vice President for the Research Area Health of the Helmholtz Association of German Research Centers. He was an Alexander von Humboldt Professor and Chair of Metabolic Diseases at the Technical University of Munich, and an Adjunct Professor at Yale University.

== Career and research ==
Tschöp obtained an M.D. from LMU Munich (1993), where he worked as a clinician (1994–1998) in neuroendocrinology before accepting a research fellowship at the Eli Lilly Discovery Research Laboratories (1999–2002) and leading a research team at the German Institute of Human Nutrition (Potsdam/Nuthetal 2002–2003). He was a Professor of Endocrinology and Diabetes at the Metabolic Diseases Institute of the University of Cincinnati (2003–2009), before being named the Arthur Russell Morgan Endowed Chair of Medicine, and Research Director of the Metabolism Center of Excellence for Diabetes and Obesity at the University of Cincinnati (2009–2011). He was Research Director of the Helmholtz Diabetes Center and Director of the Institute for Diabetes and Obesity at Helmholtz Zentrum München (2011–2018).

Early in his career, Tschöp reported on the orexigenic, adipogenic, and metabolic effects of ghrelin and its secretory control by nutrients, which has had a major influence on human obesity and diabetes research. His corresponding publication in Nature is among today's most frequently cited metabolism research papers. It added a fundamental pathway to the current model of body weight and glucose control and established novel drug targets for metabolic diseases. Tschöp went on to further dissect gut-brain communication pathways, based on GI-hormone signaling and lessons from unraveling the molecular underpinnings of gastric bypass surgery.

Together with his close collaborator Richard DiMarchi (Indiana University) he discovered and validated the novel drug class of dual and triple gut hormone co-agonists for the treatment of obesity and diabetes, and was also a co-founder of a biotechnology company MB2 LLC that was successfully acquired by Novo Nordisk in 2015. These new drugs simultaneously target several receptors and reduce body weight and blood sugar with unprecedented efficacy. Several of these compounds are in clinical trials for the treatment of diabetes and obesity and one representative of this drug class, the GIP/GLP1 receptor dual agonist Tirzepatide (Mounjaro, Eli Lilly and Company) was FDA approved for diabetes in 2022. Tschöp and DiMarchi more recently went on to discover and validate another class of drug candidates by engineering peptide to deliver steroid/small molecules to selected cell populations.

In 2022, Tschöp was a candidate to succeed Heinz Engl as rector of the University of Vienna; however, he ultimately withdrew his application.

== Other activities ==
- Cell, Member of the Advisory Board (since 2020)
- MRC London Institute of Medical Sciences, Member of Scientific Advisory Board

== Awards and recognition ==
- 2026: Broermann Medical Innovation Award
- 2026: Corresponding Member, Austrian Academy of Sciences
- 2026: Rolf Luft Award
- 2025: Hellmut Mehnert Award
- 2025: Hector Science Award, Hector Fellow Academy
- 2025: Lichtenberg Medal, Göttingen Academy of Sciences and Humanities
- 2024: Honorary Doctorate, Stockholm University
- 2023: Heinrich Wieland Prize
- 2023: Ernst Schering Prize
- 2023: Banting Medal, American Diabetes Association
- 2022: European Association for the Study of Diabetes (EASD)-Lilly Centennial Anniversary Prize
- 2022: Member of the Association of American Physicians
- 2021: Ernst Jung Prize for Medicine
- 2021: Berthold Medal of the German Society for Endocrinology
- 2020: Member of the European Molecular Biology Organization (EMBO)
- 2019: C. Ronald Kahn Distinguished Lectureship 2019–2020, Joslin Diabetes Center
- 2019: Paul Langerhans Medal
- 2018: Carus Prize, City of Schweinfurt
- 2018: Member of the Bavarian Academy of Sciences and Humanities
- 2017: Carus Medal, Academy of Sciences Leopoldina
- 2017: Charles H. Best Lectureship and Award, University of Toronto
- 2017: Hansen Family Award, Bayer Foundations
- 2017: Honorary doctorate degree (Dr. h.c.), University of Leipzig
- 2017: Rolf Sammet Professorship, Frankfurt University
- 2017: Outstanding Innovation Award, Endocrine Society
- 2017: Geoffrey Harris Prize
- 2016: The Victor Mutt Award
- 2016: European Medal of the Society for Endocrinology
- 2016: Elected Member, Academia Europaea
- 2016: ERC Advanced Grant
- 2014: Erwin Schrödinger Prize, Stifterverband Science Award – Erwin Schrödinger Prize
- 2014: Paul Martini Prize, Paul Martini Foundation
- 2014: Linda and Jack Gill Distinguished Scientist Award, Linda and Jack Gill Center for Biomolecular Science at Indiana University
- 2013: Elected Member, German National Academy of Sciences Leopoldina
- 2012: Werner-Creutzfeld-Award, German Diabetes Society
- 2012: Alexander von Humboldt Professorship, Alexander von Humboldt Foundation
- 2011: Outstanding Scientific Achievement Award, American Diabetes Association
- 2010: NIH/NIDDK 60th Anniversary Scholar Award
- 2010: André Mayer Award, Int. Association for the Study of Obesity, IASO
- 2009: Elected Member, The American Society for Clinical Investigation, ASCI
- 2007: Scientific Achievement Award, The Obesity Society, TOS/NAASO
- 2007: Christina Barz Award of the German Society for Psychiatry, Neurology and Psychosomatic Medicine
- 2002: Young Investigator Award, European Neuroendocrine Association, ENEA
- 2001: Schoeller-Junkmann Award of the German Endocrine Society, DGE
- 2000: Lilly Research Laboratories President's Award
- 2000: Eli Lilly Endocrine Research Award for Science
