= Haucke =

Haucke is a German language surname. It stems from the male given name Hugo – and may refer to:

- Gert Haucke (1929–2008), German film and television actor
- Rayk Haucke, Paralympian athlete from Germany
- Tobias Haucke (1987), German field hockey player
- Volker Haucke (1968), German biochemist and cell biologist
