= Stefan Kaufmann =

Stefan Kaufmann may refer to:

- Stefan Kaufmann (musician) (born 1960), drummer with Accept
- Stefan Kaufmann (politician) (born 1969), member of Germany's Bundestag
- Stefan H.E. Kaufmann (born 1948), microbiologist
