= Comprehensive Pneumology Center =

Translational lung research center in Munich, Germany

The Comprehensive Pneumology Center (CPC) is a translational centre for lung research in Munich, Germany.

== Structure ==
The CPC is located on the campus of LMU Munich in Munich and is an amalgamation of Helmholtz Zentrum München, LMU Munich, the LMU Klinikum - Campus Großhadern, and the Asklepios Clinics Gauting. The CPC is also one of five DZL (German Center for Lung Research) sites, initiated by the BMBF (Federal Ministry of Education and Research) DZG (German Health Research Centres) facilities.

On 12 July 2010 the Federal Research Minister Annette Schavan and the Bavarian Science Minister Wolfgang Heubisch opened the Lung Research Center [1].

The CPC is headed by a scientific director Prof. Oliver Eickelberg, MD and a clinical director Prof. Jürgen Behr, MD.

== Mission ==
The objectives of the CPC are to find new approaches to early detection, diagnosis and treatment of chronic lung diseases and to develop them. In order to translate the latest experimentally obtained findings of basic research into medical practice, the CPC adopts a translational approaches.
