= Campus Berlin-Buch =

Science, health and biotechnology cluster in Berlin, Germany

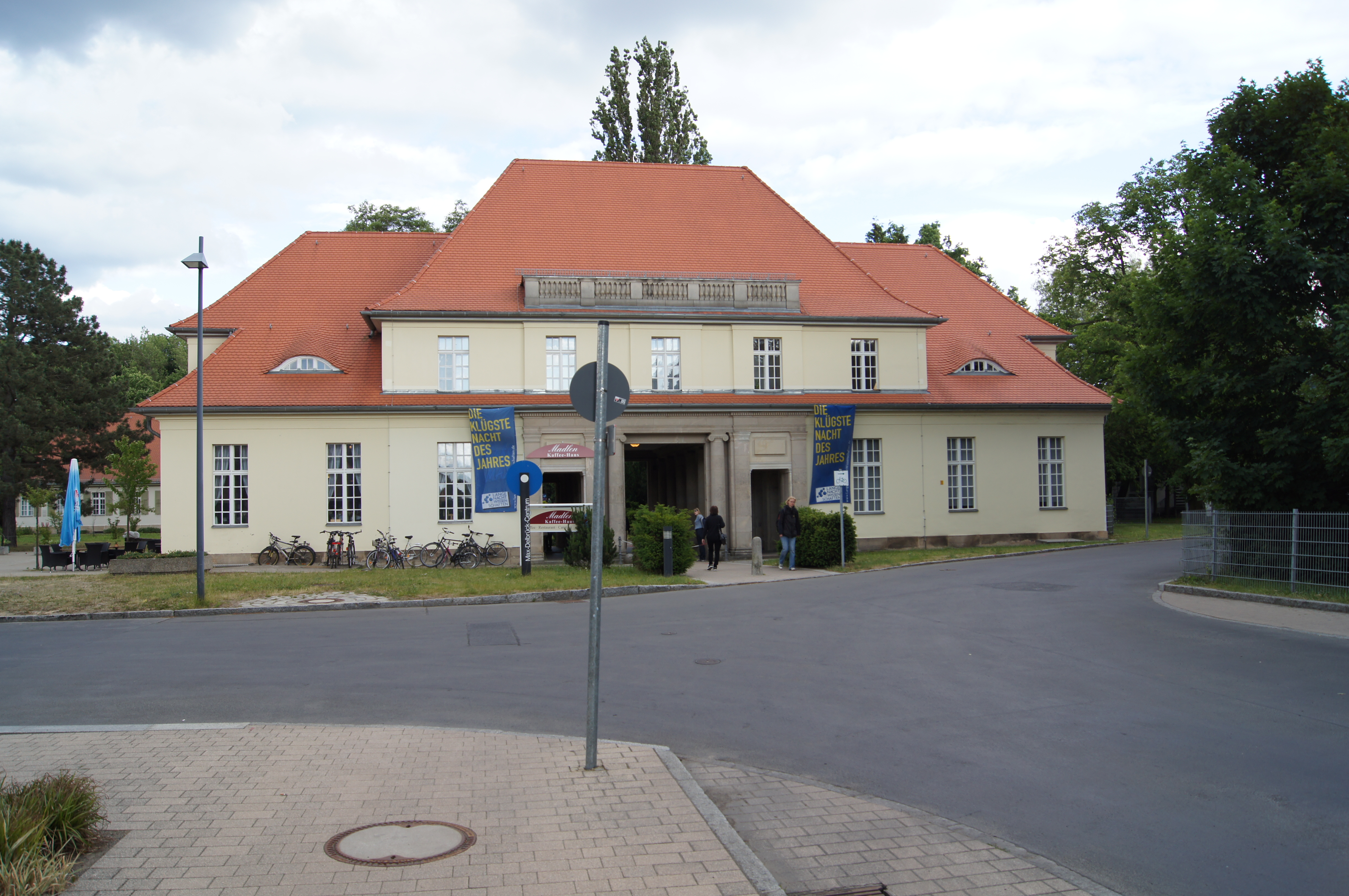
- Entrance buildings during the Long Night of the Sciences, 2012
- Established: 1990s (modern campus development)
- Research type: Science, health and biotechnology cluster
- Managing directors: Dr. Christina Quensel; Dr. Ulrich Scheller
- Location: Berlin, Germany; 52°36′21″N 13°29′17″E
- Affiliations: Max Delbrück Center for Molecular Medicine, Leibniz Institute for Molecular Pharmacology, Charité – Universitätsmedizin Berlin

Campus Berlin-Buch is a science, health and biotechnology cluster in the Buch quarter of Berlin, Germany. It co-locates basic research institutes, clinical research units and numerous biotechnology companies and start-ups. Since reunification, the site has grown into one of Berlin's recognized "Zukunftsorte" (locations of the future) for innovation policy.

The campus covers around 32 hectares and employs roughly 6,500 people in the health and biotechnology sector. As of 2025, the managing directors are Dr. Christina Quensel and Dr. Ulrich Scheller.

== History ==
The Buch area acquired a medical and scientific profile in the early 20th century with large hospital complexes. After 1945, during the German Democratic Republic period, institutes in Buch were reorganized under the Academy of Sciences. Following reunification, the site's life-science profile was consolidated; in 1992 the Max Delbrück Center for Molecular Medicine (MDC) was founded, and the surrounding area developed a biotechnology focus.

In the 1990s, the newly established biomedical campus brought together molecular research groups, specialised Charité clinics and a growing technology park in close physical proximity. The organisational structure was shaped by three former Academy of Sciences institutes, whose integration created a unified environment for basic and clinical research. Early campus development combined translational research ambitions with international recruitment at the MDC and included public facing laboratory formats that anticipated later science education initiatives on the site.

In the 2010s and 2020s the campus expanded with new research infrastructure and start-up facilities. Press coverage has described Berlin-Buch as one of Germany's largest biomedicine-oriented locations.

== Focus and partners ==
Campus Berlin-Buch's concept is to link "bench to bedside" translation between molecular and biomedical basic research, clinical environments and commercial application in biotechnology. Major stakeholders on or adjacent to the campus include the Max Delbrück Center for Molecular Medicine, the Leibniz Institute for Molecular Pharmacology (FMP), and clinical units affiliated with Charité. The campus also hosts dozens of small and medium-sized companies and start-ups in diagnostics, devices and therapeutics.

== Facilities and projects ==
=== BerlinBioCube (founders' and incubation center) ===
In October 2023, a five-storey founders' and incubation building called BerlinBioCube was inaugurated on the campus, adding about 8,000 m² of laboratory and office space. 14 young companies had secured space at opening, with roughly two thirds of the area pre-let. The project is part of multi-million-euro investment plans for the BiotechPark.

=== Cryo-electron microscopy building ===
In September 2023, a new research building with a circa four-metre-tall cryo-electron microscope, reported to cost around five million euros, was opened for Berlin's structural biology community on the campus.

=== Outreach and education: Gläsernes Labor ===
The campus hosts the Gläsernes Labor (Glass Laboratory), an out-of-school learning venue where secondary school students perform supervised experiments in molecular biology and related subjects. Newspaper reports highlight hands-on formats such as CRISPR/Cas sessions (“Gen-Schere”) offered to school classes.

== Policy context ==
The State of Berlin designates Campus Berlin-Buch as one of eleven official “Zukunftsorte” (future locations) for research and innovation policy. Government fact sheets describe the heart of the location as the 32-hectare campus with leading research institutes and one of Germany's largest biotech parks, with around 6,500 people working in the local healthcare economy.

== Institutions and companies ==
Research / Healthcare institutions (selection)

- Max Delbrück Center for Molecular Medicine (MDC): 1,179 employees (31 December 2023, excluding guests).
- Leibniz-Forschungsinstitut für Molekulare Pharmakologie (FMP): more than 270 employees.
- Charité – Universitätsmedizin Berlin (clinical research units; joint Experimental and Clinical Research Center with MDC).
- Helios Klinikum Berlin-Buch.

Selected companies

- Eckert & Ziegler (headquarters on the campus).
- T-knife.
- ASC Oncology.
- EPO Berlin-Buch (Experimental Pharmacology & Oncology).
- Glycotope.

== Gallery ==
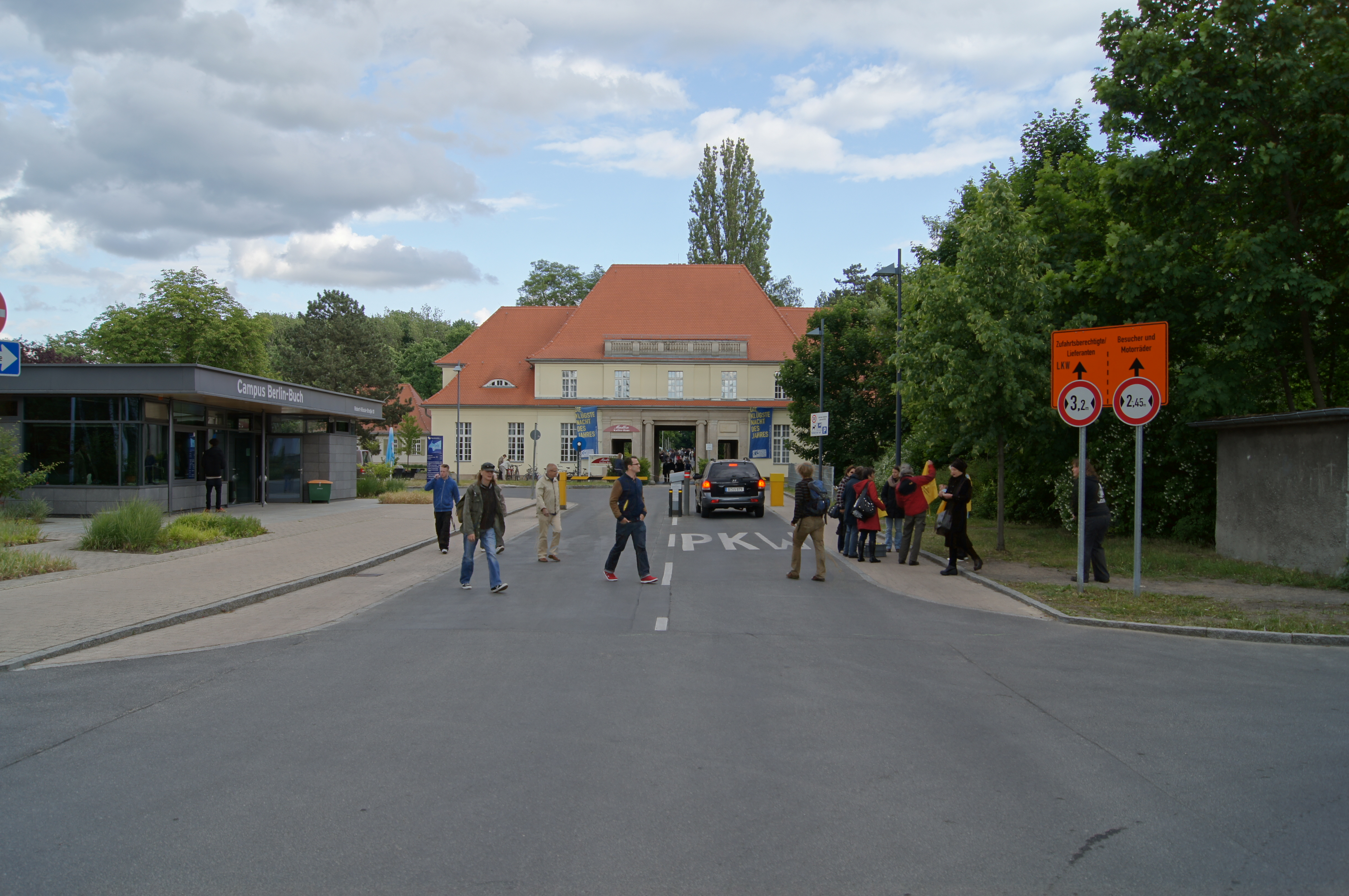
Entrance of Campus Berlin-Buch during the Long Night of the Sciences (2012)

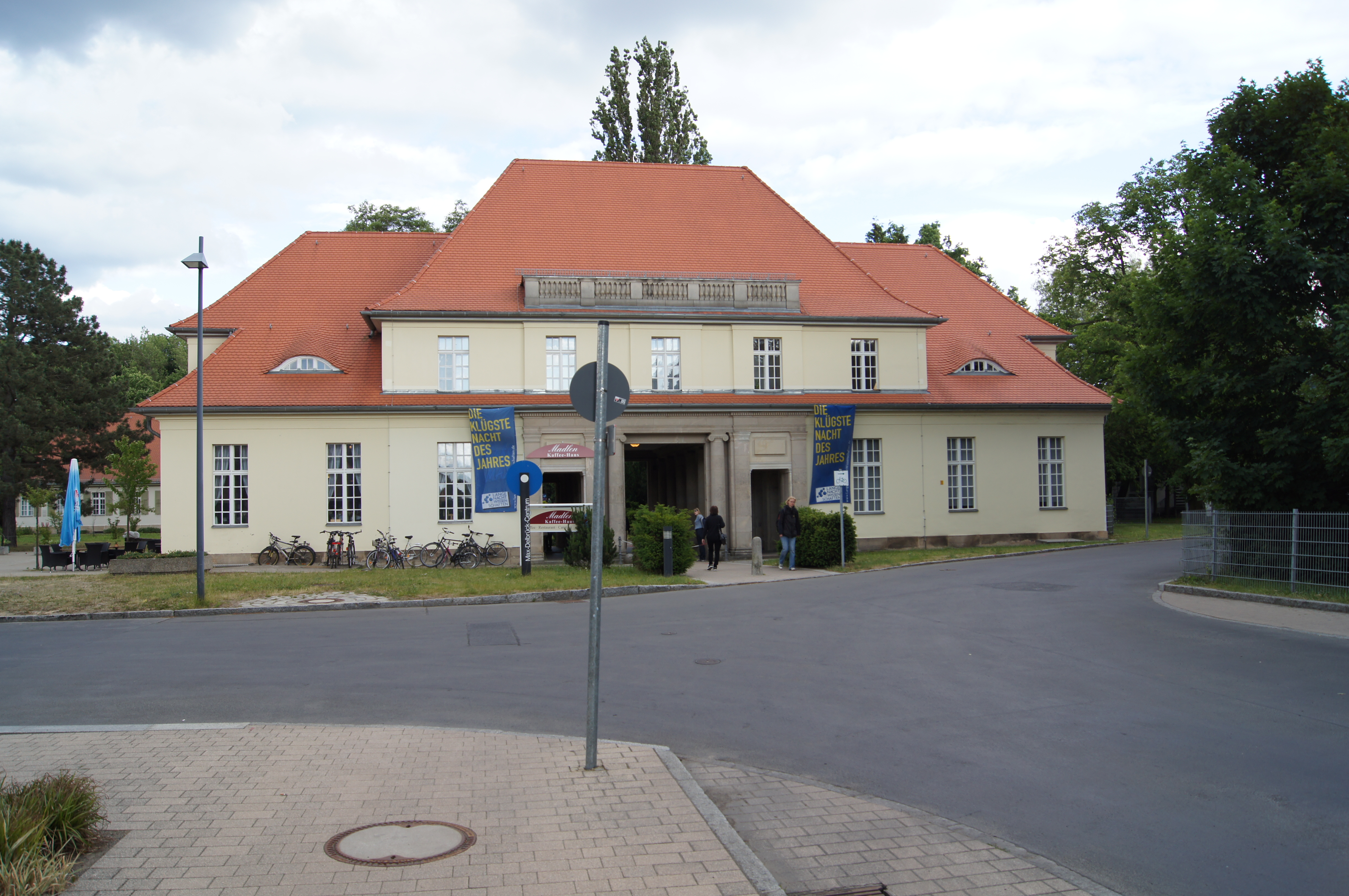
Campus entrance buildings (2012)

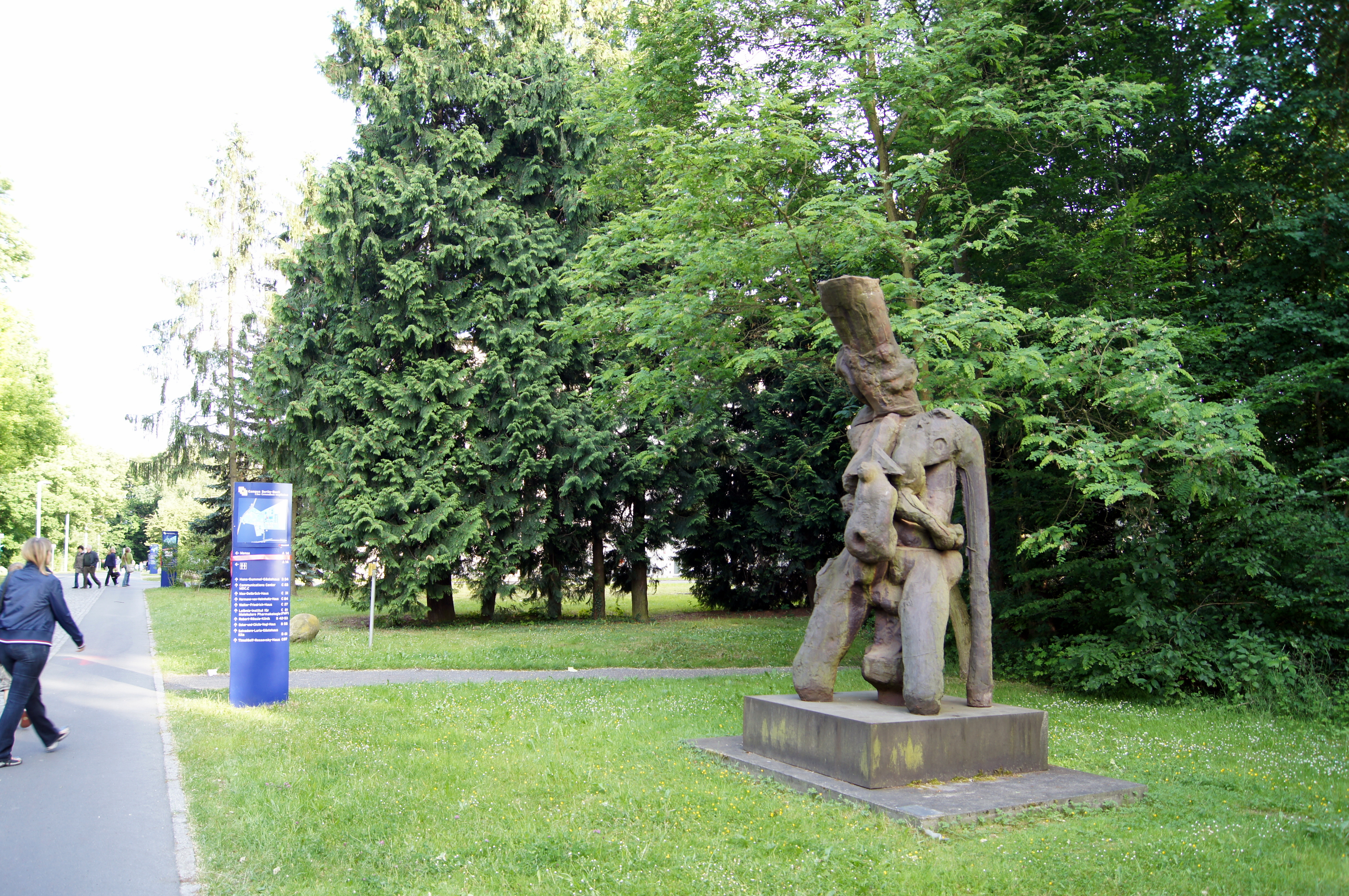
Sculpture on the campus grounds (2012)

== See also ==
- Science and technology in Germany
