= Dorothea Fiedler =

German chemical biologist

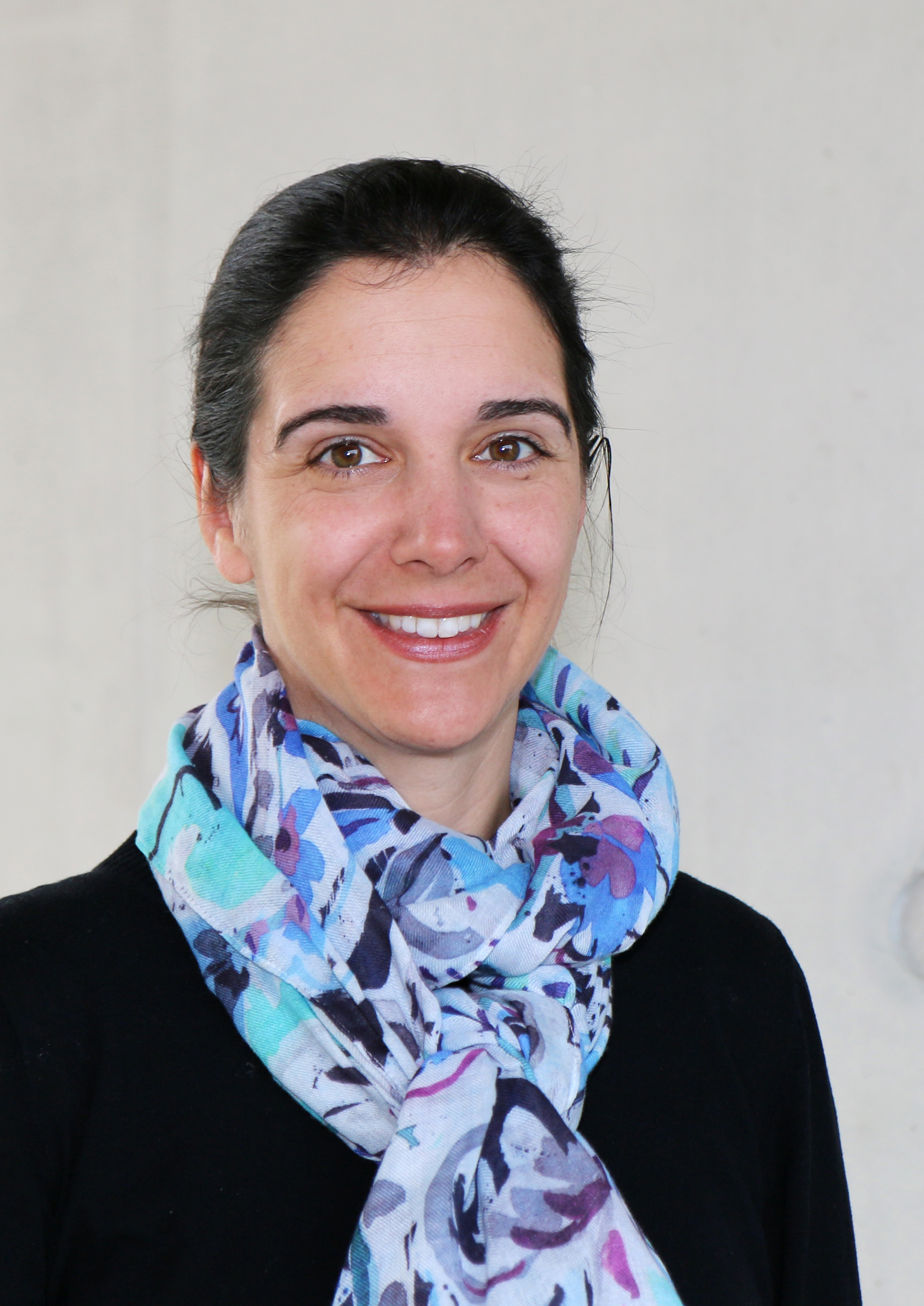
- Prof. Dr. Dorothea Fiedler
- Education: University of Würzburg (Diplom 2001); University of California at Berkeley (PhD 2005)
- Scientific career
- Workplaces: Princeton University, Leibniz-Forschungsinstitut für Molekulare Pharmakologie
- Doctoral advisors: Kenneth N. Raymond, Robert G. Bergman
- Other academic advisors: Kevan M. Shokat

Dorothea Fiedler is a chemical biologist and also the first female director of the Leibniz-Forschungsinstitut für Molekulare Pharmakologie (Leibniz Research Institute for Molecular Pharmacology, FMP) in Berlin, Germany.

== Early life and education ==
Fiedler grew up in Hamburg. She studied inorganic chemistry at the University of Würzburg, then carried out doctorate research on organometallic chemistry at the University of California at Berkeley.

== Research and career ==
Although her PhD research focussed on organometallic chemistry including host-guest systems and applications to catalysis, Fiedler became interested in cellular signal transduction pathways during her postdoctoral research at the University of California, San Francisco. She started her independent career as an assistant professor at Princeton University in 2010. Her research focuses on the synthesis and signalling roles of inositol phosphates, in particular, those with a pyrophosphate functionality, which has relevance to cellular signalling and cancer biology.

In 2015, Fiedler became the director of the Leibniz-Forschungsinstitut für Molekulare Pharmakologie as well as a professor of chemistry at the Humboldt University of Berlin. She continues developing her research focus on the synthesis and signalling roles of protein modifications involving pyrophosphates, as well as building collaborations on biological chemistry and catalysis.

== Funding, service, and awards ==
Fiedler has received a New Innovator Award totalling over $2 million from the NIH in 2013. She also received funding from the Sidney Kimmel Foundation for Cancer Research and the Rita Allen Foundation. During her postdoctoral research, she received the Ernst Schering Foundation Postdoctoral Fellowship, was on the Fastrack Program of the Robert Bosch Foundation, and obtained an NIH Pathway to Independence Award.

Fiedler is an invited speaker at the EMBO conference on Chemical Biology 2016 and at the International Symposium on Bioorganic Chemistry in 2017.

Fiedler is one of the local organizers of the 42nd National Organic Chemistry Symposium by the organic division of the American Chemical Society in 2011.
