= Helmholtz Graduate School Environmental Health =

- Type: Graduate School
- Established: November 1, 2010
- Location: Neuherberg, Oberschleißheim, Bayern, Germany
- Website: Official website

The Helmholtz Graduate School Environmental Health (HELENA) was opened on November 1, 2010. It is located in Neuherberg, north of Munich. It is a joint initiative for the promotion of doctoral students of the Helmholtz Zentrum München - German Research Center for Environmental Health, LMU Munich, and the Technical University of Munich.

== Description ==
The school studies environmental health by focusing on the pathogenic processes of common diseases that affect many people. These include chronic lung diseases, diabetes, cardiovascular diseases, cancer, Alzheimer’s disease, and depression. These occur due to complex interactions of individual genetic predisposition and environmental influences such as food, lifestyle, stress, or pollutants.

The school's program offers participants an individualized course of study within the eight thematic fields of education, listed below. These cover the entire spectrum of environmental health research. Additionally, competence in management, leadership, and communication are taught to lay the foundation for a successful scientific career.

== Thematic Fields of Education ==
1. Lung Biology and Disease
2. Diabetes and Metabolic Diseases
3. Neuro and Stem Cell Biology
4. Systems Biology, Imaging, and Structural Biology
5. Ecosystems Biology
6. Epidemiology, Health Economics, and Human Genetics
7. Infection, Immune and Tumor Biology
8. Radiation Research

== Organisation ==
- Advisory board (scientific orientation)
- Management board with representatives of the universities, the Helmholtz Zentrum München, and the graduate students
- Thesis committee (supervision of the students' work)
- Graduate student office provides service

A thesis committee guides graduate students during their doctoral studies. The committee is composed of the direct mentor, the doctoral supervisor, and an external expert. At annual meetings, the progress of a project is reviewed. After two-and-a-half years, in consultation with the thesis committee, the student has a plan in place to complete their scientific work.
