= Hartmut Oschkinat =

German biologist and professor (born 1957)

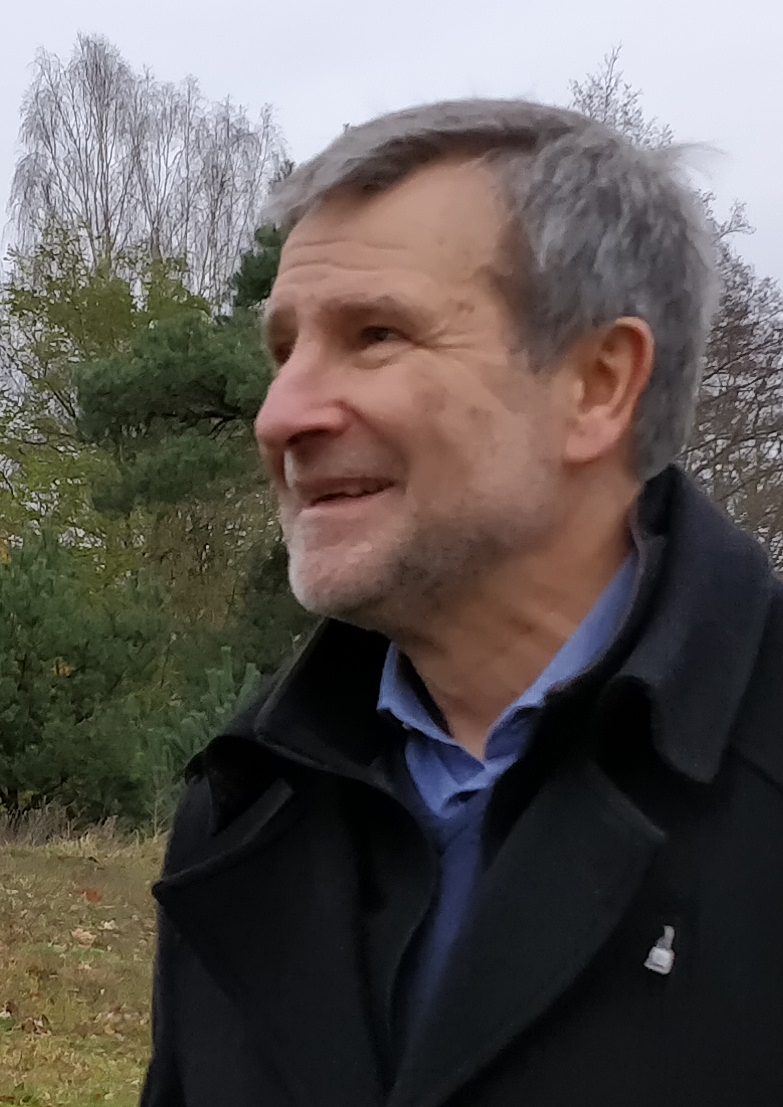
- Oschkinat in 2016
- Born: 28 February 1957 (age 69)
- Citizenship: German
- Education: Goethe University Frankfurt
- Awards: Günther Laukien Prize
- Scientific career
- Workplaces: FMP Berlin; Free University of Berlin
- Thesis: Analysis of the conformation of Cyclosporin in solution using NMR-spectroscopy: development and use of new methods (1986)
- Doctoral advisor: Horst Kessler
- Website: www.leibniz-fmp.de/research/structuralbiology/researchgroups/oschkinat/intro.html

Hartmut Oschkinat (born 28 February 1957) is a German structural biologist and professor for chemistry at the Free University of Berlin. His research focuses on the study of biological systems with solid-state nuclear magnetic resonance.

He is a member of the Editorial Boards of the Journal of Biomolecular NMR and Structure.

== Life and career ==
Oschkinat studied chemistry at the Johann-Wolfgang-Goethe University of Frankfurt. He received his doctoral degree in 1986 under the supervision of Horst Kessler with the title "Analysis of the conformation of Cyclosporin in solution using NMR-spectroscopy: development and use of new methods." in the field of nuclear magnetic resonance spectroscopy (NMR). After his work as a postdoctoral researcher with Geoffrey Bodenhausen at the University of Lausanne, Oschkinat moved to the Max Planck Institute of Biochemistry in Martinsried in 1987 as a post-doc in the Lab of Marius Clore and Angela Gronenborn. There, he was working with Marius Clore, Angela Gronenborn and the Nobel laureate Robert Huber. After his habilitation at the Technical University of Munich in 1992, Hartmut Oschkinat moved to the European Molecular Biology Laboratory in Heidelberg. Since 1998, he is the head of the department NMR-supported Structural Biology at the Leibniz-Institut für Molekulare Pharmakologie in Berlin.

== Research ==
At the beginning of his career, Oschkinat worked in the field of solution-state NMR, and made fundamental contributions to establish the role of multidimensional NMR spectroscopy in structural biology. After using solution-state NMR spectroscopy to determine three-dimensional structures of soluble proteins such as the pleckstrin homology domain and the WW domain, characterise protein–protein interactions involving the latter, with applications in fragment-based drug discovery, he moved on to focus on the investigation of biological systems by solid-state NMR (ssNMR) with magic angle spinning. His group was the first to solve a protein structure using ssNMR; the structure solved was that of a microcrystalline preparation of a SH3 domain. Since 2005, his research group investigates complex biomolecular systems such as membrane proteins within the native lipid environment, amyloid fibrils, and oligomers. Moreover, he develops methods to address challenging questions in structural biology where ssNMR can be applied with particular advantages, and have made particular contributions to the development of dynamic nuclear polarisation and proton detection using fast magic angle spinning.

== Notable Achievements ==
- 1998: elected to membership of the European Molecular Biology Organization.
- 2009–2011: Acting Director of the Leibniz-Institut für Molekulare Pharmakologie.
- 2012: International Scientific Review Board for the Central European Institute of Technology in Brno, Czech Republic.
- 2013: elected to honorary membership of the National Magnetic Resonance Society of India.
- 2014: one of six awardees of the Günther Laukien Prize, awarded annually at the Experimental Nuclear Magnetic Resonance Conference in the USA.
