= Ernst Schering Foundation =

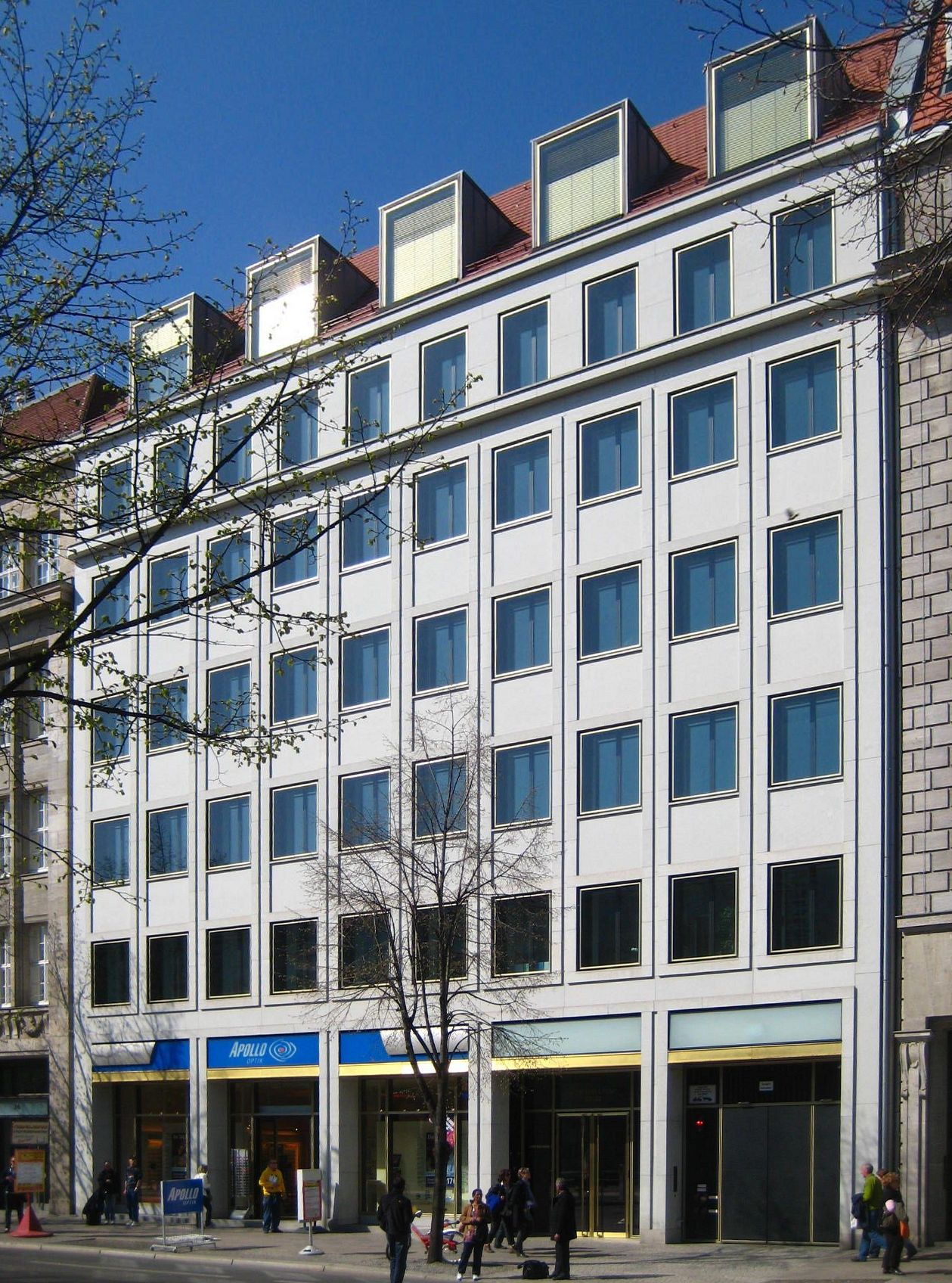
Headquarters of Ernst Schering Foundation in Berlin

The Ernst Schering Foundation (usually only "Schering Foundation") is a charitable non-profit foundation with headquarters in Berlin, Germany. It was established by Schering AG (now Bayer HealthCare Pharmaceuticals) in 2002. It is legally and financially independent and supports science and arts.

== Endowment ==
The Schering AG endowed the Schering Foundation with 35 million Euro. In addition, the foundation owns an art collection.

== Objectives ==
Regarding its support for sciences, the focus on the foundation is on life sciences. The Schering Foundation supports projects in particular in the fields of biological, medical or chemical basic research as well as the exchange and dialogue between science and society. Through the annual Ernst Schering Prize, the foundation honors distinguished scientists. Special attention is also given to young scientists, supported through stipends to study or attend training in Germany.

On the occasion of its 10th anniversary in 2012, the foundation awarded its first Friedmund Neumann Award for young scientists who achieved major breakthroughs in basic research in biology, chemistry or medicine.

Regarding its support for arts, the focus of the Schering Foundation's activities is on contemporary fine and performing arts, including dance and music. In its own exhibition venue in Berlin-Mitte, the foundation presents international contemporary artists with projects that are often developed specifically for this venue. Each year, the foundation awards together with the KW Institute for Contemporary Art in Berlin the Kunstpreis der Schering Stiftung (art award of the Schering foundation) honoring international emerging artists in fine arts.

== Organizational structure ==
The Schering Foundation has a council (Stiftungsrat) and a board (Vorstand). The council ensures that the intentions of the founder are maintained and manages the allocation of funds; its chair is Stefan Kaufmann, managing director of the Max Planck Institute for Infection Biology. The board manages the foundation's day-to-day business and represents the foundation towards third parties. Its managing director is Heike Catherina Mertens.

== External pages ==
- Official website
