= Claudia Höbartner =

Austrian-born chemist

Claudia Höbartner (born in 1977 in Krems an der Donau) is an Austrian-born chemist. She currently teaches as a professor at Julius-Maximilians-Universität Würzburg.

== Life and work ==
Claudia Höbartner studied Technical Chemistry at Technische Universität Wien. She did her diploma thesis at ETH Zurich, and after that completed her doctoral studies at Leopold-Franzens-Universität Innsbruck. In 2005, she moved to the University of Illinois in Urbana-Champaign/USA as a postdoc with an Erwin Schrödinger Research Fellowship from the Austrian Science Fund. In 2008, she became the head of a research group at the Max Planck Institute for Biophysical Chemistry (today: MPI for Multidisciplinary Science) in Göttingen. In 2014, she became a professor of chemistry at Georg-August-Universität, Göttingen, and in 2017, she succeeded Gerhard Bringmann as Professor of Organic Chemistry I at the Institute of Organic Chemistry, University of Würzburg.

== Research areas ==
Höbartner's scientific interest is in the nucleic acids DNA and RNA and their function as biocatalysts that mediate the course of biochemical reactions. In 2016, she published the first X-ray structure of a DNA enzyme (deoxyribozyme) that catalyzes the ligation of two RNA fragments in Nature.

She has developed DNA enzymes for the detection of modified nucleotides in RNA, too. In 2020, she reported, also in Nature the first methyltransferase ribozyme (MTR1), and published its structure and mechanism in 2022. The discovery of the methyltransferase ribozyme provides clues to the catalytic abilities of RNA, which may have played an important role during early evolution. Methylated nucleotides are found in the RNA of all living organisms at precisely defined sites that are essential for the structure and function of RNA. In addition, methylated nucleotides play an important role in mRNA vaccines.

Another project of her research group deals with the investigation of the replication inhibition of COVID-19 by Remdesivir and Molnupiravir.

== Academic distinctions ==
- 2004: Roche Symposium Award (Leading chemists of the next decade), Basel, Switzerland
- 2005: Georg and Christine Sosnovsky Award, (Thesis Award, Universität Innsbruck, Austria)
- 2005: Erwin Schrödinger Postdoctoral Fellowship, FWF
- 2007: Hertha Firnberg fellowship, Austrian Science Fund (FWF) & BMWF
- 2010: European Young Chemist Award (EuCheMS, Silver Medal)
- 2011: Research Award of the Peter and Traudl Engelhorn Foundation
- 2013: Hellmut Bredereck Foundation Award
- 2016: ERC Consolidator Grant
- Since 2019 Corresponding Member Abroad, Austrian Academy of Sciences (ÖAW)
- 2020: ASEM-DUO-India Fellowship program for Professors
- 2022: Elected Member, Section Biochemie und Biophysik, German National Academy of Sciences – Leopoldina
- 2023: Gottfried Wilhelm Leibniz Prize (DFG)
- 2023: Order of the Bavarian Constitution, Munich, Germany
- 2023: Hansen Family Award

== Other activities ==
- Since 2020 Associate Editor (Co-Editor) Royal Society of Chemistry (RSC) “Chemical Biology”
- Since 2015 Editorial Advisory Board, ChemBioChem

== Selected publications ==
- C. Höbartner, M.-O. Ebert, B. Jaun, R. Micura: RNA‐Konformationsgleichgewichte und der Einfluss der Methylierung von Nucleobasen auf die Gleichgewichtslage. In: Wiley Online Library. 2002. doi:10.1002/1521-3757(20020215)114:4<619::AID-ANGE619>3.0.CO;2-2
- A. Serganov, S. Keiper, L. Malinina, C. Höbartner u. a.: Structural basis for Diels-Alder ribozyme-catalyzed carbon-carbon bond formation. In: Nat Struct Mol Biol. Band 12, 2005, S. 218–224. doi:10.1038/nsmb906
- D. Heller, H. Jin, B. Martinez, C. Höbartner u. a.: Multimodal optical sensing and analyte specificity using single-walled carbon nanotubes. In: Nature Nanotech. Band 4, 2009, S. 114–120. doi:10.1038/nnano.2008.369
- A. Ponce-Salvatierra, K. Wawrzyniak-Turek, U. Steuerwald, C. Höbartner u. a.: Crystal structure of a DNA catalyst. In: Nature. Band 529, 2016, S. 231–234. doi:10.1038/nature16471
- C. P. M. Scheitl, M. Ghaem Maghami, A. K. Lenz, C. Höbartner u. a.: Site-specific RNA methylation by a methyltransferase ribozyme. In: Nature. Band 587, 2020, S. 663–667. doi:10.1038/s41586-020-2854-z
- A. Liaqat, C. Stiller, M. Michel, M. V. Sednev, C. Höbartner: N6-isopentenyladenosine in RNA determines the cleavage site of endonuclease deoxyribozymes. In: Angew. Chem. Int. Ed. Band 59, 2020, S. 18627–18631. doi:10.1002/anie.202006218
- List of publications
