= Ilme Schlichting =

German biophysicist

Ilme Schlichting (born March 8, 1960) is a German biophysicist.

== Academic work ==
Ilme Schlichting studied biology and physics at the University of Heidelberg from 1979 to 1987. She earned a PhD in biology there in 1990. Schlichting pursued post-doctoral studies at the Max Planck Institute for Medical Research and at Brandeis University in Boston in the United States as a Feodor Lynen Fellow. From 1994 to 2001 she was head of a working group at the Max Planck Institute of Molecular Physiology in Dortmund. Since 2002 she is director of the department for Biomolecular Mechanisms at the Max Planck Institute for Medical Research.

Schlichting has studied the structure and operation of biomolecules using protein crystallography. During her PhD she made important contributions to the understanding of the switch function of the Michaelis complex and hence to the understanding of this enzyme during her doctorate using the Laue method. Recently, Schlichting has been one of the founders of time-resolved protein crystallography at Free-electron lasers.

== Awards ==
- Feodor Lynen Fellowship, Alexander von Humboldt Foundation, 1990
- Karl Lohmann Prize, 1991
- Otto Hahn Medal, 1991
- Ernst Schering Prize, 1998
- Gottfried Wilhelm Leibniz Prize, Deutsche Forschungsgemeinschaft, 2000
- Member of the Academy of Sciences Leopoldina, 2003
- Carus Medal, 2003
- Fellow of the American Physical Society, 2003
- Cross of Merit of Order of Merit of the Federal Republic of Germany, 2008
- Spiers Memorial Award of the Royal Society of Chemistry, 2018
