= Volker Haucke =

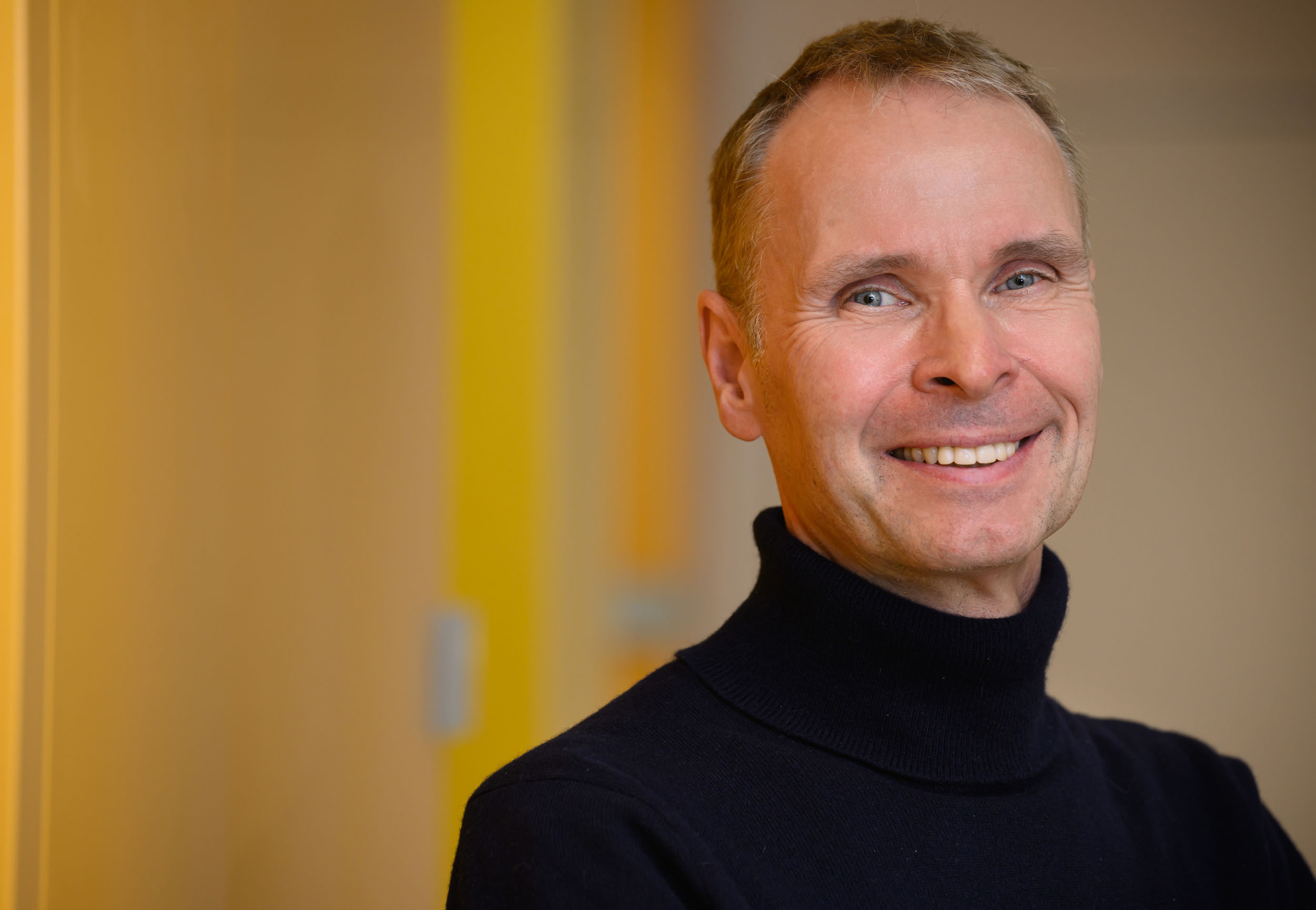
Volker Haucke (2025)

Volker Haucke (born 29 June 1968 in Berleburg, now Bad Berleburg, Germany) is a biochemist and cell biologist. He is Director of the Leibniz-Forschungsinstitut für Molekulare Pharmakologie Berlin (FMP) Berlin and Professor of Molecular Pharmacology at the Institute for Pharmacy of the Free University of Berlin.

== Biography ==
Volker Haucke studied biochemistry from 1989 to 1994 as a scholarship holder of the German National Merit Foundation at the Free University of Berlin and the Biozentrum of the University of Basel. In 1997, he was awarded a PhD with the distinction "summa cum laude" in biochemistry by the University of Basel (Biozentrum) for his work in the laboratory of Gottfried Schatz on mitochondrial protein import machinery. After a research stay funded by the Human Frontier Science Programme Organization (HFSP) and the European Molecular Biology Organization (EMBO) from 1997 to 2000 at the Yale University School of Medicine as a Postdoctoral Research Associate at the Howard Hughes Medical Institute (HHMI) in the group of Pietro De Camilli, he headed an independent research group funded by the Deutsche Forschungsgemeinschaft at the Center for Biochemistry and Molecular Cell Biology at the University of Göttingen from 2000.

In 2003, he was appointed Professor of Membrane Biochemistry at the Free University of Berlin. Since 2007, he has also been a member of the NeuroCure Cluster of Excellence at Charité - Universitätsmedizin Berlin. Haucke was spokesperson for the Collaborative Research Centers (SFB) 449 (Structure and Function of Membrane Receptors, from 2008 to 2010) and 958 (Scaffolding of Membranes) (2011–2012, since 2012 Deputy Spokesperson). Since 2012, Haucke has been Director at the Leibniz-Forschungsinstitut für Molekulare Pharmakologie (FMP) in Berlin and Professor (W3-S) of Molecular Pharmacology at the Freie Universität Berlin. He is also a faculty member of the Charité-Universitätsmedizin Berlin. At the FMP, he heads the Section of Molecular Physiology and Cell Biology.

From 2008 to 2016 he was an elected member of the review board biochemistry of the German Research Foundation (DFG) and from 2007 to 2012 a member of the editorial board of the Journal of Biological Chemistry. He is currently a member of the editorial boards of EMBO Reports, Cell Stress and Biology of the Cell as well as the Scientific Advisory Boards of various national and international research institutes. Haucke has been an elected member of the European Molecular Biology Organization (EMBO) since 2014 and a member of the German National Academy of Sciences Leopoldina since 2017. Also in 2017 he received the Avanti Award of the American Society for Biochemistry and Molecular Biology (ASBMB) and was awarded funding within the Reinhart-Koselleck program of the German Research Foundation.In 2020, Volker Haucke was awarded the Feldberg Prize. He was also awarded one of the ERC Advanced Grants of the European Research Council (ERC). In 2025, Haucke was awarded the Gottfried Wilhelm Leibniz Prize of the German Research Foundation, the most important research funding prize in Germany. In the same year, the Ernst Schering Foundation also awarded him the Ernst Schering Prize. In addition, in 2025 he received funding for the second time in the Reinhart Koselleck Program of the German Research Foundation for an innovative, interdisciplinary research project.

Volker Haucke is married and has two daughters.

== Research interests ==
Volker Haucke and his research group are investigating the molecular mechanisms of endo- and exocytosis, the uptake of substances into and release from cells via membrane-enveloped vesicles, especially in nerve cells. Another focus of his research is deciphering the mechanisms of intracellular membrane flux and nutrient signaling in the endosomeal and lysosomeal system and their control by specific membrane lipids, so-called phosphoinositides, and their role in the formation, maintenance and function of the human nervous system. The laboratory utilizes a variety of technologies and systems, including human stem cell-based models, correlative super-resolution microscopy and correlative light and electron microscopy, cryogenic electron microscopy, electrophysiology, proteomics, genome engineering, and genetic manipulations at the organismal level in vivo. The overarching goal of these studies is to mechanistically understand how metabolic signaling and the endolysosomal system contribute to the development and maintenance of the nervous system and how dysfunction can lead to neurological disease. His major discoveries include the identification of novel lipid remodeling mechanisms that control exo- and endocytosis, cellular signaling, and metabolism, the development of selective inhibitors for the endocytotic uptake of substances into cells, the dissection of new pathways and mechanisms of synaptic vesicle recovery and regeneration and neuronal autophagy and the identification of a lysosome-related vesicle, characterized by a distinctive rare signaling lipid, as a presynaptic progenitor organelle in fly and human neurons. His research is of high biomedical relevance for the understanding and treatment of hereditary muscle disorders, cancer, and neurological (e.g. stroke, epilepsy) and neurodegenerative diseases (e.g. Alzheimer's disease, amyotrophic lateral sclerosis ALS).

== Scientific affiliations ==
- Member TRR 186 Molecular Switches
- Member SFB 1315 Memory consolidation
- Member and Principal Investigator, Exzellenzcluster EXC 257 NeuroCure
- Founding Chair and Member, SFB 958 Scaffolding of Membranes
- Member, Helmholtz International Research School Molecular Neurobiology at Max-Delbrück-Center (MDC), Berlin, Germany
- Member, American Society for Cell Biology (ASCB), Rockville, USA
- Member, American Society for Biochemistry & Molecular Biology (ASBMB), Bethesda, USA
- Member, Society for Neuroscience (SFN), Washington D.C.
- Member, German Society for Biochemistry & Molecular Biology (GBM), Frankfurt, Germany
- Member, German Society for Cell Biology (DGZ), Heidelberg, Germany

== Honors ==
- 2025 Reinhart Koselleck Program of the German Research Foundation (DFG)
- 2025 Ernst Schering Prize
- 2025 Gottfried Wilhelm Leibniz Prize
- 2023–2025 President of the German Society for Biochemistry & Molecular Biology, Frankfurt (GBM)
- 2021–2023 First Vice president of the German Society for Biochemistry & Molecular Biology, Frankfurt (GBM)
- 2020 ERC Advanced Grant, European Research Council
- 2020 Feldberg Prize
- 2019 Member of Academia Europaea
- 2017 Member of Berlin-Brandenburgischen Akademie der Wissenschaften
- 2017 Elected Member of The German National Academy of Sciences Leopoldina
- 2017 Avanti Award of the American Society for Biochemistry & Molecular Biology (ASBMB) 2017
- 2016 Reinhart-Koselleck-Award of the Deutsche Forschungsgemeinschaft (DFG)
- 2014 Elected Member, European Molecular Biology Organization (EMBO)
- 2003 Young Investigator Award (YIP), European Molecular Biology Organization
- 1998 Long-Term Fellowship Award, Human Frontier Science Program
- 1997 Long-Term Fellowship Award, European Molecular Biology Organization
- 1994 Boehringer Ingelheim Fellow
- 1993 Dr. Carl-Duisberg-Foundation Scholar
- 1990–1993 Scholarship Holder of the Studienstiftung des deutschen Volkes

== Video ==
- Video on Volker Haucke's research (Latest Thinking)
