= Hansen Family Award =

The Hansen Family Award was established in 2000 by Kurt Hansen – former chairman of the board and supervisory board of Bayer AG.

The Bayer Foundation awards the Hansen Family Award, endowed with 75,000 euros, to scientists in the German-speaking region for research in scientific fields related to medicine. It is awarded every two years in alternation with the Otto Bayer Award.

== Recipients ==
- 2000: Thomas Jentsch
- 2002: Christian Haass und Ralf Baumeister
- 2005: Rüdiger Klein
- 2007: Magdalena Götz
- 2009: Patrick Cramer
- 2011: Stefan Hell
- 2013: Hans-Georg Rammensee
- 2015: Emmanuelle Charpentier
- 2017: Jens Claus Brüning, Matthias H. Tschöp
- 2019: Edith Heard
- 2021: Kai Johnsson
- 2023: Claudia Höbartner
