= Patrick Cramer =

German biochemist (born 1969)

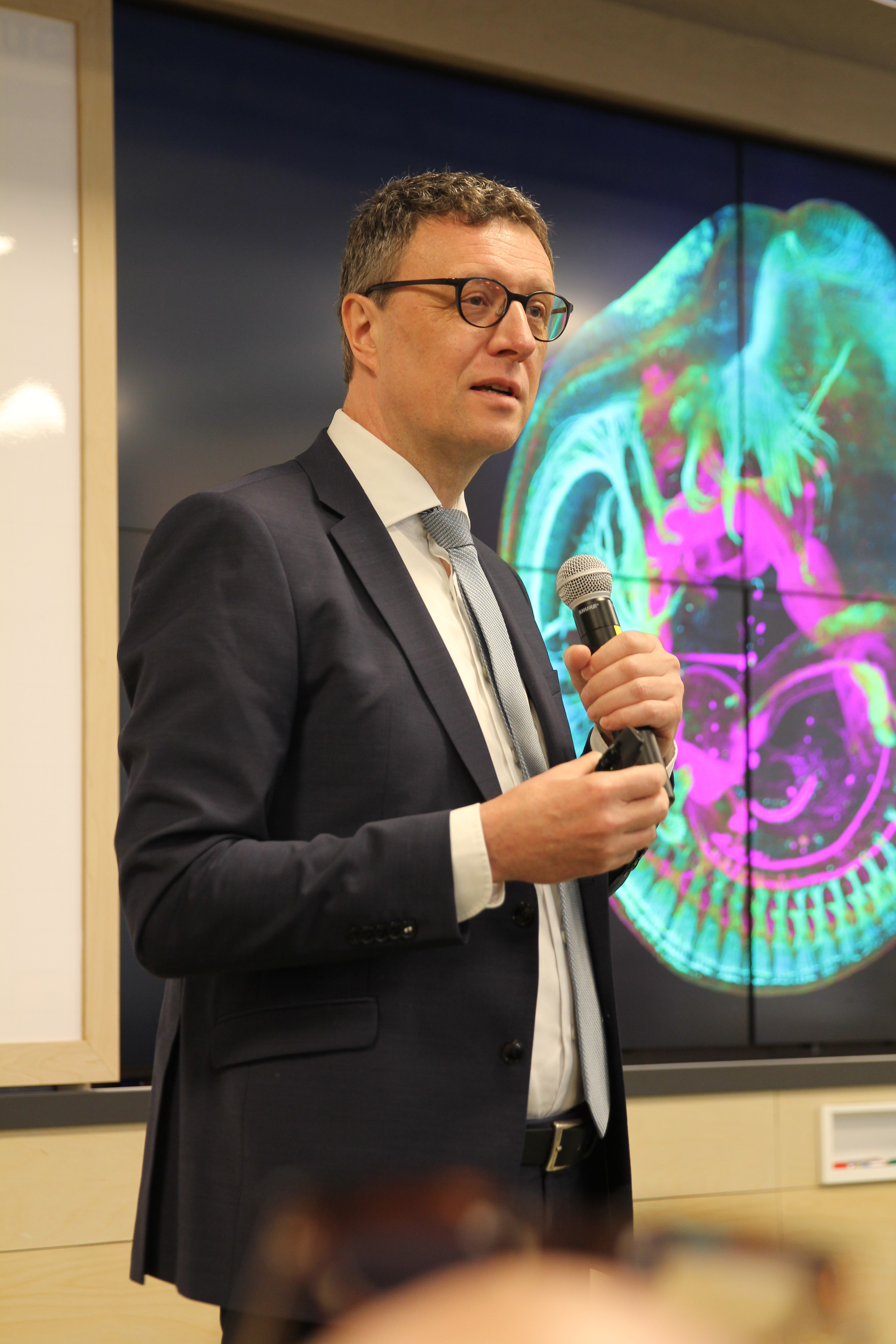
- Born: 3 February 1969 (age 57); Stuttgart, West Germany
- Awards: Gottfried Wilhelm Leibniz Prize (2006); Ernst Jung Prize (2009); Louis-Jeantet Prize (2021); Shaw Prize (2023)
- Scientific career
- Fields: Biochemistry
- Workplaces: Max Planck Institute for Biophysical Chemistry, Göttingen; Karolinska Institutet, Stockholm
- Website: www.mpibpc.mpg.de/cramer

Patrick Cramer (born 3 February 1969) is a German chemist, structural biologist, and molecular systems biologist. In 2020, he was elected an international member of the National Academy of Sciences. He became president of the Max Planck Society in June 2023.

== Early life and education ==
Cramer studied chemistry at the University of Stuttgart and Heidelberg University (Germany) from 1989 until 1995. He completed a part of his studies as ERASMUS scholar at the University of Bristol in the UK. As a research student, he also worked in the lab of Sir Alan Fersht in Cambridge, UK at the MRC Laboratory for Molecular Biology (LMB) site. In 1995 until 1998 he worked as a PhD student in laboratory of Christoph W. Müller at the European Molecular Biology Laboratory (EMBL) in Grenoble, France. He obtained his PhD in natural sciences (Dr. rer. nat.) from Heidelberg University in 1998.

== Career in research ==
=== Stanford University, 1999–2001 ===
From 1999 until 2001 Cramer worked as postdoctoral researcher and fellow of the German Research Foundation (DFG) in the laboratory of the later Nobel Prize laureate Roger D. Kornberg at Stanford University, US.

=== LMU Munich, 2001–2013 ===
In 2001, Cramer returned to Germany, where he obtained a tenure-track professorship for biochemistry at the Gene Center of LMU Munich where he was later, in 2004, appointed full professor of biochemistry. Patrick Cramer headed the LMU Gene Center for 10 years, from 2004 until 2013. He also served as Dean of the School of Chemistry and Pharmacy from 2007 to 2009, and as Director of the Department of Biochemistry from 2010 to 2013. Cramer also was a member of the University Research Board from 2007 to 2013 and speaker of the research network grant SFB464 of the German Research Council (DFG).

=== Max Planck Institute for Biophysical Chemistry, 2014–2023 ===
In 2014, Cramer was appointed Director at the Max Planck Institute for Biophysical Chemistry in Göttingen, Germany.

== Max Planck Society, 2023–present ==
Since 22 June 2023, Cramer has been serving as president of the Max Planck Society.

== Achievements ==
Cramer conducts basic research as the head of the Department of Molecular Biology at the Max Planck Institute in Göttingen. He also works as a science manager and an honorary professor at the University of Göttingen. During his postdoctoral research with Roger Kornberg, Cramer determined the atomic, three-dimensional structure of RNA polymerase II, one of the biggest enzymes in the cell nucleus. This work played a decisive role when the Nobel Prize in chemistry was awarded to Roger Kornberg in 2006 for studies of the molecular basis of eukaryotic transcription.

Cramer's laboratory investigates the molecular mechanisms and systemic principles of gene transcription in eukaryotic cells. The laboratory uses integrated structural biology methods, including X-ray crystallography, cryo-electron microscopy, and biochemical tools. The Cramer laboratory also uses functional genomics and computational biology approaches to study the principles of transcription in living cells.

Cramer's group created the first molecular movie of transcription initiation and elongation. Moreover, Patrick Cramer developed methods to analyze fundamental aspects of RNA metabolism in cells by integrating aspects of both molecular and systems biology. His long-term goal is to understand the expression and the regulation of the genome. The laboratory thus pioneers an approach that combines structural and genome-wide methods and may be referred to as molecular systems biology.

In April 2020, Cramer's team at the Max Planck Institute of Biophysical Chemistry created the first "3D structure of the corona polymerase" for the COVID-19 virus. Their model will allow researchers "to investigate how antiviral drugs such as remdesivir – which blocks the polymerase – work, and to search for new inhibitory substances."

Cramer also commits himself to the further development of life sciences in Germany and Europe. He was one of the founders of the national cluster of excellence "Center for Integrated Protein Science (CIPSM)" and initiated the construction of the new research building, the "Munich Research Center for Molecular Biosystems (BioSysM)".

In addition, Cramer was one of the members of the scientific and technical advisory board of the Bavarian state government and worked on bioethics within the institute TTN.

== Other activities ==
=== Corporate boards ===
- Wacker Chemie, Member of the Supervisory Board (since 2023)

=== Non-profit organizations ===
- Robert Koch Foundation, Member of the Board of Trustees
- Bayer Foundation, Chair of the Board of Trustees (2020–2022)
- European Molecular Biology Laboratory (EMBL), Chair of the Council (2016–2019)
- Cell, Member of the Editorial Board (2016–2022)

== Publications ==
=== Original research articles (selection) ===
- Schwalb, Björn; Michel, Margaux; Zacher, Benedikt; Frühauf, Katja; Demel, Carina; Tresch, Achim; Gagneur, Julien; Cramer, Patrick (3 June 2016). "TT-seq maps the human transient transcriptome". Science. 352 (6290): 1225–1228. Bibcode:2016Sci...352.1225S. doi:10.1126/science.aad9841. ISSN 0036-8075. PMID 27257258. S2CID 8549873.
- Plaschka, C.; Hantsche, M.; Dienemann, C.; Burzinski, C.; Plitzko, J.; Cramer, P. (2016). "Transcription initiation complex structures elucidate DNA opening". Nature. 533 (7603): 353–358. Bibcode:2016Natur.533..353P. doi:10.1038/nature17990. hdl:11858/00-001M-0000-002A-6CC4-0. PMID 27193681. S2CID 4465762.
- Bernecky, Carrie; Herzog, Franz; Baumeister, Wolfgang; Plitzko, Jürgen M.; Cramer, Patrick (2016). "Structure of transcribing mammalian RNA polymerase II". Nature. 529 (7587): 551–554. Bibcode:2016Natur.529..551B. doi:10.1038/nature16482. hdl:11858/00-001M-0000-0029-7D45-3. PMID 26789250. S2CID 4404463.
- Plaschka, C.; Larivière, L.; Wenzeck, L.; Seizl, M.; Hemann, M.; Tegunov, D.; Petrotchenko, E. V.; Borchers, C. H.; Baumeister, W. (2015). "Architecture of the RNA polymerase II–Mediator core initiation complex". Nature. 518 (7539): 376–380. Bibcode:2015Natur.518..376P. doi:10.1038/nature14229. hdl:11858/00-001M-0000-0024-CED0-5. PMID 25652824. S2CID 4450934.
- Schulz, Daniel; Schwalb, Bjoern; Kiesel, Anja; Baejen, Carlo; Torkler, Phillipp; Gagneur, Julien; Soeding, Johannes; Cramer, Patrick (21 November 2013). "Transcriptome surveillance by selective termination of noncoding RNA synthesis". Cell. 155 (5): 1075–1087. doi:10.1016/j.cell.2013.10.024. hdl:11858/00-001M-0000-0015-39ED-1. ISSN 1097-4172. PMID 24210918.
- Kostrewa, Dirk; Zeller, Mirijam E.; Armache, Karim-Jean; Seizl, Martin; Leike, Kristin; Thomm, Michael; Cramer, Patrick (2009). "RNA polymerase II–TFIIB structure and mechanism of transcription initiation". Nature. 462 (7271): 323–330. Bibcode:2009Natur.462..323K. doi:10.1038/nature08548. hdl:11858/00-001M-0000-0015-8570-1. PMID 19820686. S2CID 205218821.
- Bushnell, David A.; Cramer, Patrick; Kornberg, Roger D. (5 February 2002). "Structural basis of transcription: α-Amanitin–RNA polymerase II cocrystal at 2.8 Å resolution". Proceedings of the National Academy of Sciences. 99 (3): 1218–1222. Bibcode:2002PNAS...99.1218B. doi:10.1073/pnas.251664698. ISSN 0027-8424. PMC 122170. PMID 11805306.
- Cramer, P.; Bushnell, D. A.; Fu, J.; Gnatt, A. L.; Maier-Davis, B.; Thompson, N. E.; Burgess, R. R.; Edwards, A. M.; David, P. R. (28 April 2000). "Architecture of RNA polymerase II and implications for the transcription mechanism". Science. 288 (5466): 640–649. Bibcode:2000Sci...288..640C. doi:10.1126/science.288.5466.640. hdl:11858/00-001M-0000-0015-872F-3. ISSN 0036-8075. PMID 10784442.

=== Review articles (selection) ===
- Plaschka, Clemens; Nozawa, Kayo; Cramer, Patrick (2016). "Mediator Architecture and RNA Polymerase II Interaction". Journal of Molecular Biology. 428 (12): 2569–2574. doi:10.1016/j.jmb.2016.01.028. ISSN 0022-2836. PMID 26851380.
- Sainsbury, Sarah; Bernecky, Carrie; Cramer, Patrick (2015). "Structural basis of transcription initiation by RNA polymerase II". Nature Reviews Molecular Cell Biology. 16 (3): 129–143. doi:10.1038/nrm3952. ISSN 1471-0072. PMID 25693126. S2CID 32487971.
- Cramer, Patrick (2014). "A Tale of Chromatin and Transcription in 100 Structures". Cell. 159 (5): 985–994. doi:10.1016/j.cell.2014.10.047. hdl:11858/00-001M-0000-0024-44B9-9. ISSN 0092-8674. PMID 25416940. S2CID 8634234.
- Cheung, Alan C.M.; Cramer, Patrick (2012). "A Movie of RNA Polymerase II Transcription". Cell. 149 (7): 1431–1437. doi:10.1016/j.cell.2012.06.006. hdl:11858/00-001M-0000-0015-3E91-7. ISSN 0092-8674. PMID 22726432. S2CID 18405467.
- Cramer, Patrick (2006). "Deciphering the RNA polymerase II structure: a personal perspective". Nature Structural & Molecular Biology. 13 (12): 1042–1044. doi:10.1038/nsmb1206-1042. ISSN 1545-9993. PMID 17146456. S2CID 31141435.

=== Other publications (selection) ===
- Aufbruch in die molekulare Systembiology. - Essay for the anniversary edition "20 Jahre Laborjournal", Published in Laborjournal on 11 July 2014.
- Entwicklungen in der Biomedizin: Genom-Sequenzierung in Diagnose, Prävention und Therape; Systembiologie und Medizin. In: T. Rendtorff (Hrsg.): Zukunft der biomedizinischen Wissenschaften. Nomos, 2013, ISBN 978-3-8487-0849-9.
- O. Primavesi, P. Cramer, R. Hickel, T. O. Höllmann; W. Schön: Lob der Promotion. Published in Frankfurter Allgemeine Zeitung on 19 July 2013.
- J. Hacker, T. Rendtorff, P. Cramer, M. Hallek, K. Hilpert, C. Kupatt, M. Lohse, A. Müller, U Schroth, F. Voigt, M. Zichy. Biomedizinische Eingriffe am Menschen – Ein Stufenmodell zur ethischen Bewertung von Gen- und Zelltherapie. Water de Gruyter, Berlin. ISBN 978-3-11-021306-5 (2009).

== Awards and honours (selection) ==
- 2000 EMBO Young Investigator Award
- 2000 MSC Future Investigator Award
- 2002 GlaxoSmithKline Science Award
- 2004 10th Eppendorf Award for Young European Researchers
- 2006 Leibniz Prize
- 2008 Bijvoet Medal, Bijvoet Center for Biomolecular Research, Utrecht University
- 2009 Ernst Jung Prize for Medicine
- 2009 Hansen Family Award, Bayer Science & Education Foundation
- 2009 Member, German National Academy of Sciences Leopoldina
- 2009 Member, European Molecular Biology Laboratory (EMBL)
- 2010 Advanced Grant of the European Research Council ('TRANSIT')
- 2010 Medal of Honour, Robert Koch Institute
- 2011 Feldberg Foundation Prize
- 2012 Vallee Foundation Visiting Professorship
- 2012 Cross of Merit of the Federal Republic of Germany
- 2012 Paula und Richard von Hertwig Preis
- 2015 Arthur Burkhardt Preis
- 2015 Guest Professor, Karolinska Institutet, Stockholm, Sweden
- 2016 Advanced Grant of the European Research Council ('TRANSREGULON')
- 2016 Centenary Award of the British Biochemical Society
- 2017 Elected Member, Academia Europaea
- 2017 Honorary Professor, University of Göttingen
- 2017 Weigle Lectureship, University of Geneva
- 2018 Inaugural George William Jourdian Lectureship, University of Michigan
- 2019 Ernst Schering Prize
- 2020 Otto Warburg Medal
- 2021 Louis-Jeantet Prize for Medicine
- 2023 Shaw Prize in Life Sciences
- 2025 Honorary doctorate, Bar-Ilan University
