= Magdalena Götz =

Polish neuroscientist

Magdalena Götz (born 17 January 1962) is a German neuroscientist. She is noted for her study of glial cells and holds a chair at LMU Munich's Department of Physiology. She is involved in the field of adult neurogenesis. Götz discovered that glial cells are neural stem cells in the developing mammalian brain. Current investigations study the mechanisms involved in determining how adult neural stem cells are specified. Götz current work focuses on refining ways to reprogram glial cells into neurons in organisms with traumatic brain injury. The German Stem Cell Network published an interview with Götz in 2015 explaining her research field.

== Early life and education ==
Götz studied Biology between the years 1982 and 1989 at the University of Tübingen, Germany and in Zürich, Switzerland. She was promoted in 1992 to the position of Dr. rer. nat. at the Friedrich-Miescher Laboratory of the Max-Planck Society, Tübingen. After her promotion and until 1996, she was a postdoctoral fellow at the National Institute for Medical Research, London and Smith Kline Beecham, Harlow.

== Career ==
Götz led an independent Research Group at the Max-Planck Institute of Neurobiology in Martinsried, Munich between 1997 and 2003. She has been the Director of the Institute of Stem Cell Research at the Helmholtz Center Munich since 2004. Götz has been chair of Physiological Genomics at LMU Munich. Since 2011, Götz has held a Research Professorship at LMU.

Götz is a member of the Synergy Board as well as a Principal Investigator in the Münch Cluster for Systems Neurology, also known as Synergy.

== Awards and honors ==
- 2007 Gottfried Wilhelm Leibniz Prize
- 2007 Hansen Family Award
- 2008 Hans and Ilse Breuer Award
- 2010 Order of Merit of the Federal Republic of Germany
- 2013 Remedios Caro Almela Prize on Developmental Neurobiology
- 2014 Ernst Schering Prize
- 2014 Advanced Research Grant by the European Research Council (ERC)
- 2015 Carl-Zeiss Award of the German Society for Cell Biology
- 2015 German Stem Cell Network Female Scientist Award
- 2016 Prize of the Roger de Spoelberch Foundation
- 2018 Schellenberg Award

== Publications ==
Access the complete list of Götz's publications here.

- Falkner S*, Grade S*, Dimou L, Conzelmann K-K, Bonhoeffer T, Götz M*, Hübener M*. Transplanted embryonic neurons integrate into adult neocortical circuits. Nature 539:248-53 (2016)
- Gascón S*, Murenu E*, Masserdotti G, Ortega F, Russo GL, Petrik D, Deshpande A, Heinrich C, Karow M, Robertson SP, Schroeder T, Beckers J, Irmler M, Berndt C, Angeli JP, Conrad M, Berninger B, Götz M. Identification and Successful Negotiation of a Metabolic Checkpoint in Direct Neuronal Reprogramming. Cell Stem Cell 18:396-409 (2016)
- Masserdotti G*, Gillotin S*, Sutor B, Drechsel D, Irmler M, Jørgensen HF, Sass S, Theis FJ, Beckers J, Berninger B, Guillemot F*, Götz M*. Transcriptional mechanisms of proneural factors and REST in regulating neuronal reprogramming of astrocytes. Cell Stem Cell 17:74-88 (2015)
- Ninkovic J, Steiner-Mezzadri A, Jawerka M, Akinci U, Masserdotti G, Petricca S, Fischer J, von Holst A, Beckers J, Lie CD, Petrik D, Miller E, Tang J, Wu J, Lefebvre V, Demmers J, Eisch A, Mezger D, Crabtree G, Irmler M, Poot R, Götz M. The BAF complex interacts with Pax6 in adult neural progenitors to establish a neurogenic cross-regulatory transcriptional network. Cell Stem Cell 13:403-18 (2013)
- Stahl R, Walcher T, De Juan Romeo C, Pilz GA, Cappello S, Irmler M, Sanz Anquela JM, Beckers J, Blum R, Borrell V, Götz M. Trnp1 regulates expansion and folding of the mammalian cerebral cortex by control of radial glial fate. Cell 153:535-49 (2013)
- Sirko S*, Behrendt G*, Johansson P, Tripathi P, Costa M, Bek S, Heinrich C, Tiedt S, Colak D, Dichgans M, Fischer IR, Plesnila N, Staufenbiel M, Haass C, Snapyan M, Saghatelyan A, Tsai L-H, Fischer A, Grobe K, Dimou L, Götz M. Reactive glia in the injured brain acquire stem cell properties in response to sonic hedgehog. Cell Stem Cell 12:426-39 (2013)
- Bardehle S, Krüger M, Schwausch J, Ninkovic J, Clevers H, Snippert HJ, Buggenthin F, Theis FJ, Meyer-Luehmann M, Bechmann, Dimou L, Götz M. Live imaging of astrocyte responses to acute injury reveals selective juxtavascular proliferation. Nature Neuroscience 16:580-6 (2013)
- Cappello S, Böhringer CRJ, Bergami M, Conzelmann K-K, Ghanem A, Tomassy GS, Arlotta P, Mainardi M, Allegra M, Caleo M, van Hengel J, Brakebusch C, Götz M. A radial glia specific role of RhoA in double-cortex formation. Neuron 73:911-24 (2012)
- Beckervordersandforth R, Tripathi P, Ninkovic J, Bayam E, Lepier A, Stempfhuber B, Kirchhoff F, Hirrlinger J, Haslinger A, Chichung LD, Beckers J, Yoder B, Irmler M, Götz M. In vivo fate mapping and expression analysis reveals unique molecular hallmarks of prospectively isolated adult neural stem cells. Cell Stem Cell 7:744-58 (2010)
- Buffo A, Rite I, Tripathi P, Lepier A, Colak D, Horn A-P, Mori T, Götz M. Origin and progeny of reactive gliosis: A source of multipotent cells in the injured brain. PNAS 105:3581-86 (2008)
