= Horst Kessler =

German chemist

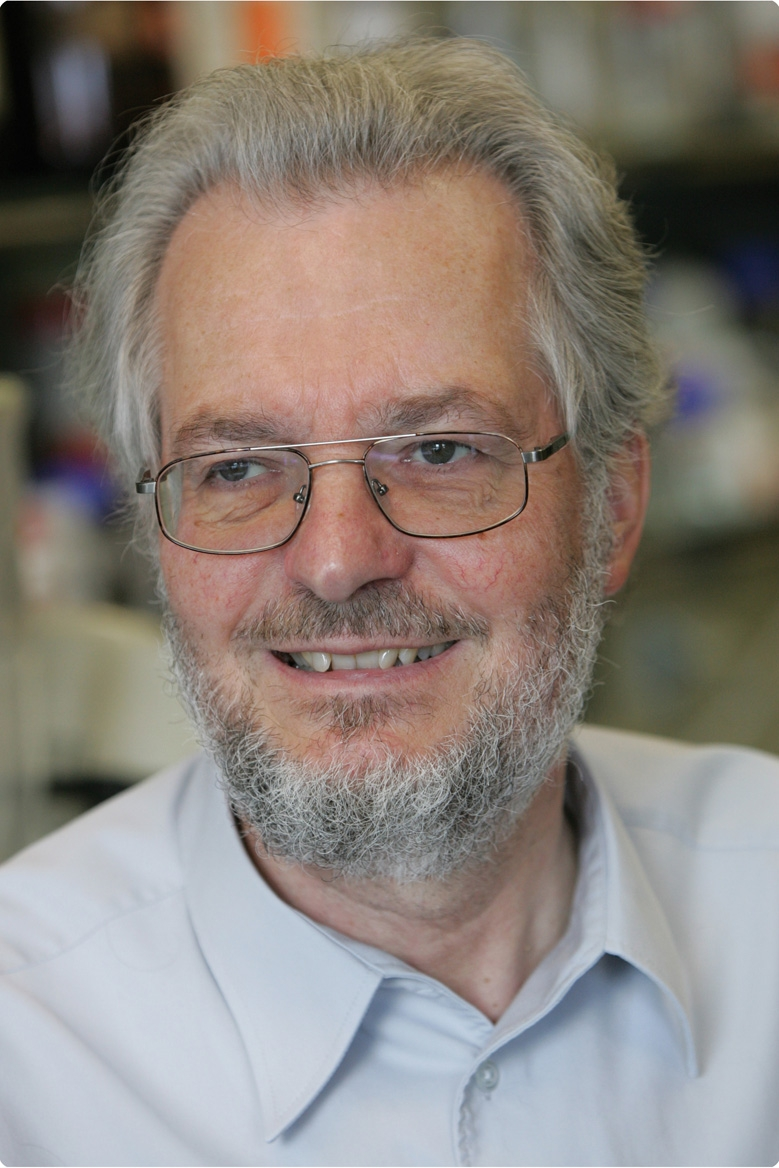
- Born: 5 April 1940 (age 86); Suhl, Germany
- Citizenship: German
- Education: University of Tübingen
- Scientific career
- Workplaces: Technical University of Munich
- Theses: Kupfersalzkatalysierte Diazomethanreaktion mit Aromaten (1966); Nachweis innermolekularer Beweglichkeit durch NMR-Spektroskopie (1969)
- Doctoral advisor: Eugen Müller
- Doctoral students: Hartmut Oschkinat

Horst Kessler (born 5 April 1940) is a German chemist and emeritus Professor of Excellence at the Institute for Advanced Study at the Technical University of Munich (TUM). Kessler works in the area of bioorganic chemistry, in particular peptide synthesis, and nuclear magnetic resonance spectroscopy. He also made contributions to magnetic resonance imaging.

== Education and career ==
Kessler studied chemistry at the Leipzig University in 1958–1961. He completed his Master (Diplom) in 1963, and his PhD at 1966 with Eugen Müller at the University of Tübingen. In 1969, he underwent habilitation in organic chemistry. He was briefly a university lecturer at Tübingen, then he obtained an organic chemistry lecturer position at the University of Frankfurt am Main. In 1989, he became Professor of organic chemistry and biochemistry at the Technical University of Munich (TUM), where he was in charge of overseeing the installation of one of the four 900 MHz NMR spectrometers in Germany at that time. At TUM, he was Dean of the Faculty of Chemistry, Biology and Earth Sciences from 1994 to 1996. From October 2008, he is a Carl-von-Linde Professor (Emeritus Professor of Excellence) at the TUM Institute for Advanced Study.

== Notable achievements and awards ==
In 1996, Kessler became a member of the Bavarian Academy of Sciences and Humanities, one of the eight state academies in Germany. In 2002, he was elected to membership of the Academy of Sciences Leopoldina, the national academy of Germany.

- R. Bruce Merrifield Award, American Peptide Society, 2015.
- Josef Rudinger Memorial Award (joint with Manfred Mutter), European Peptide Society, 2008.
- Burckhardt Helferich Prize for bioorganic chemistry, 2005.
- Vincent du Vigneaud Award, American Peptide Society, 2002.
- Max Planck Research Prize, Max Planck Society, 2001.
- Emil Fischer Medal, German Chemical Society, 1997.

== Publications ==
The following research articles are the most highly cited according to the Google Scholar profile of Kessler As of June 2021:

- Ulrich Hersel; Claudia Dahmen; Horst Kessler (1 November 2003). "RGD modified polymers: biomaterials for stimulated cell adhesion and beyond". Biomaterials. 24 (24): 4385–4415. doi:10.1016/s0142-9612(03)00343-0. ISSN 0142-9612. PMID 12922151. Wikidata Q34223126.
- Marco Arnold; Elisabetta A Cavalcanti-Adam; Roman Glass; Jacques Blümmel; Wolfgang Eck; Martin Kantlehner; Horst Kessler; Joachim P Spatz (1 March 2004). "Activation of integrin function by nanopatterned adhesive interfaces". ChemPhysChem. 5 (3): 383–388. doi:10.1002/cphc.200301014. ISSN 1439-4235. PMID 15067875. Wikidata Q44832858.
- Kessler, Horst (July 1982). "Conformation and Biological Activity of Cyclic Peptides". Angewandte Chemie International Edition in English. 21 (7): 512–523. doi:10.1002/anie.198205121. ISSN 0570-0833.
- Dechantsreiter MA; Planker E; Mathä B; Lohof E; Hölzemann G; Jonczyk A; Goodman SL; Kessler H (1 August 1999). "N-Methylated cyclic RGD peptides as highly active and selective alpha(V)beta(3) integrin antagonists". Journal of Medicinal Chemistry. 42 (16): 3033–3040. doi:10.1021/jm970832g. ISSN 0022-2623. PMID 10447947. Wikidata Q30580638.
- Elisabetta A Cavalcanti-Adam; Tova Volberg; Alexandre Micoulet; Horst Kessler; Benjamin Geiger; Joachim Pius Spatz (2 February 2007). "Cell spreading and focal adhesion dynamics are regulated by spacing of integrin ligands". Biophysical Journal. 92 (8): 2964–2974. doi:10.1529/biophysj.106.089730. ISSN 0006-3495. PMC 1831685. PMID 17277192. Wikidata Q30479140.
- Kessler, Horst (2023). NMR: Mein Kompass in der Organischen und Medizinischen Chemie [NMR: my compass in organic and medicinal chemistry]. Berlin: GNT Publishing GmbH. ISBN 978-3-86225-132-2. OCLC 1428558981. e-book: ISBN 978-3-86225-555-9, DOI:10.47261/1555 (autobiography).

== Personal life ==
Horst Kessler was the son of Walter and Gertrude Kessler. He went to school from 1946 to 1958 in Suhl.
