= Max Planck Institute for Infection Biology =

Research institute in Berlin, Germany

Coordinates: 52°31′30″N 13°22′31″E

The Max Planck Institute for Infection Biology (MPIIB) is a non-university research institute of the Max Planck Society located in the heart of Berlin in Berlin-Mitte. It was founded in 1993. Arturo Zychlinsky is currently the Managing Director. The MPIIB is divided into 8 research groups, two partner groups and the Emeritus Group of founding director Stefan H. E. Kaufmann. The department "Regulation in Infection Biology" headed by 2020 Nobel laureate Emmanuelle Charpentier was hived off as an independent research center in May 2018. The Max Planck Unit for the Science of Pathogens is now administratively independent of the Max Planck Institute for Infection Biology. In October 2019, Igor Iatsenko and Matthieu Domenech de Cellès established their research groups at the institute, Mark Cronan started his position as research group leader in March 2020. Silvia Portugal joined the institute in June 2020 as Lise Meitner Group Leader. Two more research groups where added in 2020, Felix M. Key joined in September and Olivia Majer in October, completing the reorganization of the Max Planck Institute for Infection Biology. Simone Reber joined as Max Planck Fellow in 2023 and now heads the research group Quantitative Biology. Research Group Leader Olivia Majer left the Institute in 2025 to join the Cincinnati Children's Hospital Medical Center.

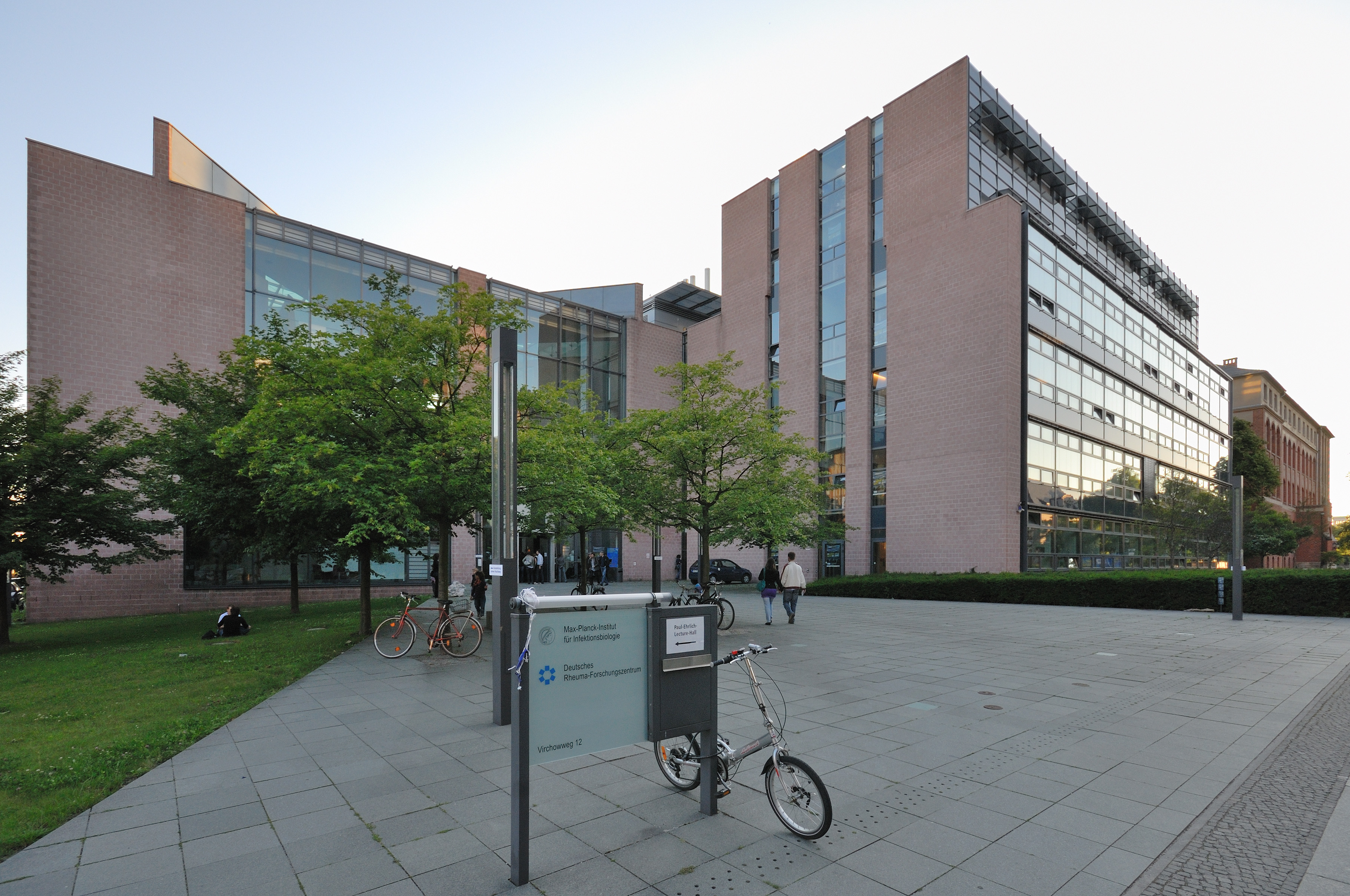
MPI for Infection Biology on Campus Charité Mitte, Berlin

== Research Groups ==
- Mark Cronan heads the research group "In vivo cell biology of infections". The group is investigating how granulomas develop in the course of a tuberculosis infection and how host-directed therapies can be used to protect host organisms against infections.
- Matthieu Domenech de Cellès is the leader of the research group "Infectious Disease Epidemiology". Their focuses on the population biology of infectious diseases, with a view to understanding how individual-level mechanisms of infection translate into population-level dynamics.
- Igor Iatsenko heads the research group "Genetics of Host-Microbe Interactions". Its aim is to understand the mechanisms of how the host discriminates and responds to different microbial challenges.
- Felix M. Key heads the "Evolutionary Pathogenomics" research group, which aims to uncover the genetic mechanisms and phenotypic variation that underlay emergence and adaptation of infectious microbes.
- The Vector Biology research unit is headed by Elena Levashina. It is studying the role mosquitoes play in regulating the development of malaria parasites.
- The Lise Meitner group leader Silvia Portugal heads the "Malaria Parasite Biology" research group, focusing on the interactions between malaria parasites and hosts in a seasonally-changing environment.
- Max Planck Fellow Simone Reber heads the group Quantitative Biology, where she works on the biochemical and biophysical principles that underlie the self-organization and scaling of organelles with a focus on the properties of tubulin.
- Marcus Taylor is the leader of the "Visualisation of Immune Signalling" research group. His group is trying to decipher cellular information transfer in the context of infections and immune responses.
- The Department of Cellular Microbiology is headed by Arturo Zychlinsky. The group's research focus is the hypothesis that chromatin may have evolved to have an immune function in eukaryotes. The group is testing this hypothesis by looking at "Neutrophil Extracellular Traps" (NETs), which were discovered by the group, and by studying the role of histones in the immune system.
- The Emeritus Group of Stefan H. E. Kaufmann, focuses on various aspects of the infection and immunology of tuberculosis as well as rational vaccine research.

== Graduate Program ==
The institute also has an International Max Planck Research School for Infectious Diseases and Immunology in Berlin. The IMPRS-IDI is an English language doctoral program with participating faculty from the Free University of Berlin, Humboldt University of Berlin, the Robert Koch Institute, the German Rheumatism Research Center, and the Leibniz Institute for Zoo and Wildlife Research. The IMPRS-IDI, together with five other graduate schools, forms the "ZIBI Graduate School Berlin". IMPRS-IDI's mission is "better understanding of host-pathogen interactions at all levels". Arturo Zychlinsky is the IMPRS-IDI's spokesperson.
