= Stefan H. E. Kaufmann =

German biologist

Stefan H.E. Kaufmann
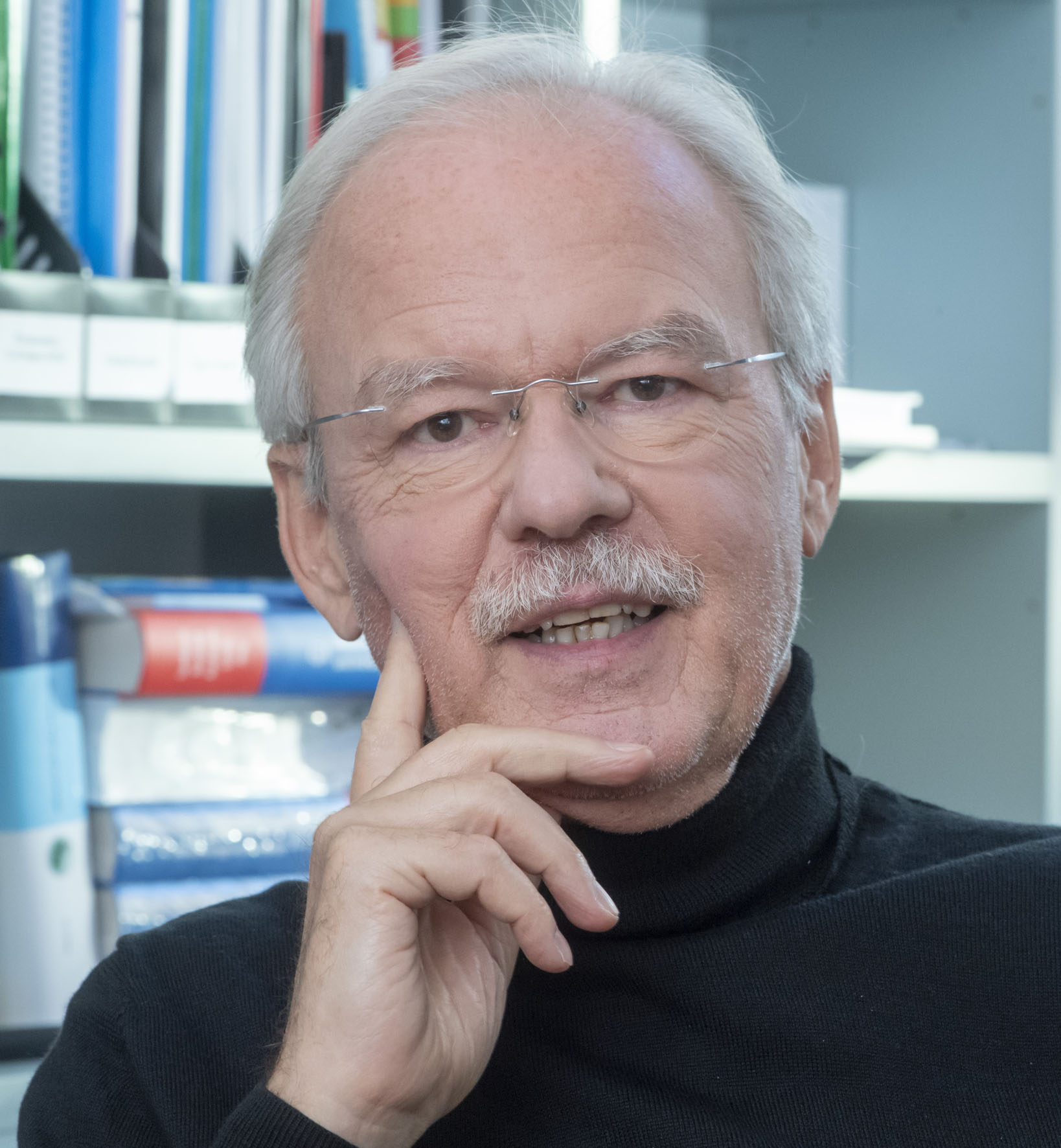
- Born: 8 June 1948 (age 78); Ludwigshafen am Rhein, Germany
- Education: University of Mainz, 1977; Free University Berlin, 1981
- Known for: Tuberculosis research Vaccine development Cell-mediated immunity
- Spouse: Elke Kaufmann
- Children: 2
- Awards: DGHM Förderpreis, Alfried Krupp Award, Aronson Prize, Smith Kline Beecham Science Prize, Merckle Science Prize, Robert Pfleger Prize, Pettenkofer Prize, Gagna A. & Ch. Van Heck Prize, Ernst Hellmuth Vits Prize
- Scientific career
- Fields: Immunology; Microbiology; Infection Biology
- Workplaces: University of Mainz; University of Ulm; Charité – Universitätsmedizin Berlin; Max Planck Institute for Infection Biology; Max Planck Institute for Multidisciplinary Sciences; Texas A&M University
- Website: www.mpiib-berlin.mpg.de/research/immunology

Stefan Hugo Ernst Kaufmann (born 8 June 1948 in Ludwigshafen am Rhein, Germany) is a German immunologist and microbiologist, recognized as one of the most highly cited immunologists worldwide for the decade 1990–2000. His research focuses on cell-mediated immunity to infectious diseases, particularly tuberculosis. He is widely recognized for his contributions to immunology, infection biology, vaccine development, and global health research.

== Career ==
Kaufmann received his Dr. rer. nat. (PhD) at the University of Mainz in 1977 and habilitated in immunology and microbiology at the Free University Berlin in 1981. He was a student of immunologist Paul Klein. He studied biology prior to his doctoral training, and Klein’s mentorship in infection and immunity significantly influenced Kaufmann’s early scientific focus. He worked as a research scientist at the Max Planck Institute for Immunobiology in Freiburg from 1982 to 1987.

From 1987 to 1998, he held professorships (C3 and later C4) at the University of Ulm. He first served as Professor of Medical Microbiology and Immunology (1987–1991) and later as Full Professor and Chair of Immunology (1991–1998).

In 1993, Kaufmann became the founding director of the Max Planck Institute for Infection Biology in Berlin. He served in this role until 2019, after which he became director emeritus. After stepping down as director, he established and continues to lead an emeritus research group focused on systems immunology at the Max Planck Institute for Multidisciplinary Sciences in Göttingen.

He leads an emeritus group on systems immunology at the Max Planck Institute for Multidisciplinary Sciences in Göttingen. Since 1998, he is also professor for immunology and microbiology at Charité Berlin and was appointed Senior Professor in 2022. He became Faculty Fellow at the Hagler Institute for Advanced Study, Texas A&M University, in 2018. Kaufmann collects historical medical books.

Kaufmann has held visiting or honorary professorships at several international institutions, including Tongji University School of Medicine (Shanghai), Peking Union Medical College (Beijing), Universidad Peruana Cayetano Heredia (Lima), and Stellenbosch University (South Africa).

== Research ==
Kaufmann has published over 1000 original and review articles. He has an h-index >160 (Google Scholar, May 2025) and over 110,000 citations.

His research addresses immune responses to intracellular bacterial pathogens, with particular emphasis on tuberculosis. His work has examined innate and adaptive immune mechanisms, including T-cell responses, cytokine signaling, mucosal immunity, regulatory RNA, and systems immunology, with a focus on rational design of vaccines as well as diagnostic and prognostic biosignatures for tuberculosis.

He has contributed to the development of tuberculosis vaccine candidates, including formulations that have advanced to late-stage clinical trials. One of the most prominent examples is the recombinant vaccine VPM1002, which has progressed to Phase III clinical trials. Related clinical studies have also explored applications in therapy of bladder cancer and prevention of Covid-19 through trained immunity.

Kaufmann’s research has addressed broader aspects of host–pathogen interactions, immune regulation, and translational immunology. His work has contributed to conceptual advances in understanding protective immunity against intracellular pathogens and has informed vaccine strategies that integrate both innate and adaptive immune responses. Moreover, he has also been instrumental in elucidating biosignatures which predict progression from latent infection to active disease.

He has played a central role in international vaccine and immunology initiatives, including interdisciplinary and multinational consortia focused on infectious disease control. His research activities have spanned basic science, preclinical development, and clinical evaluation, reflecting an emphasis on translational impact.

== Memberships ==
Kaufmann has been a member of numerous scientific organizations, including the German Society of Immunology (DGfI), the European Federation of Immunological Societies (EFIS), and the International Union of Immunological Societies (IUIS), where he has previously served as president. He is also a member of the Max Planck Society, the Berlin-Brandenburg Academy of Sciences and Humanities, the German Academy of Sciences Leopoldina, EMBO, the American Academy of Microbiology, and the TuBerculosis Vaccine Initiative (TBVI).

He has additionally served in advisory and governance roles for international health and research organizations, including the Global Alliance for Vaccines and Immunization (GAVI), the Global Alliance for TB Drug Development (TB Alliance), and the European and Developing Countries Clinical Trials Partnership (EDCTP).

== Awards ==
- Alfried Krupp Award (1987)
- Aronson Prize (1988)
- SmithKline Beecham Science Prize (1991)
- Merckle Science Prize (1991)
- Robert Pfleger Prize (1992)
- Pettenkofer Prize (1992)
- Scientific Prize of the German Society for Hygiene and Microbiology (1993)
- Honorary doctorate (Doctor Honoris Causa), Aix-Marseille University (2007)
- Gardner Middlebrook Award (2014)
- Gagna and Ch. Van Heck Prize (2018)
- Ernst Hellmuth Vits Prize (2022)
- Lifetime Achievement Award, Savitribai Phule Pune University (2024)

== Selected publications ==
- The New Plagues: Pandemics and Poverty in a Globalized World (2009)
- AIDS and Tuberculosis: A Deadly Liaison (2011)
- The Immune Response to Infection (2011)
- Handbook of Tuberculosis (2012)
- Basiswissen Immunologie (2014; revised edition 2025)
- Tuberculosis (2020)
