= Helmholtz Zentrum München =

German medical research institute

Coordinates: 48°13′21″N 11°35′36″E

Helmholtz Zentrum München - Helmholtz Munich
- Helmholtz Zentrum München German Research Center for Environmental Health
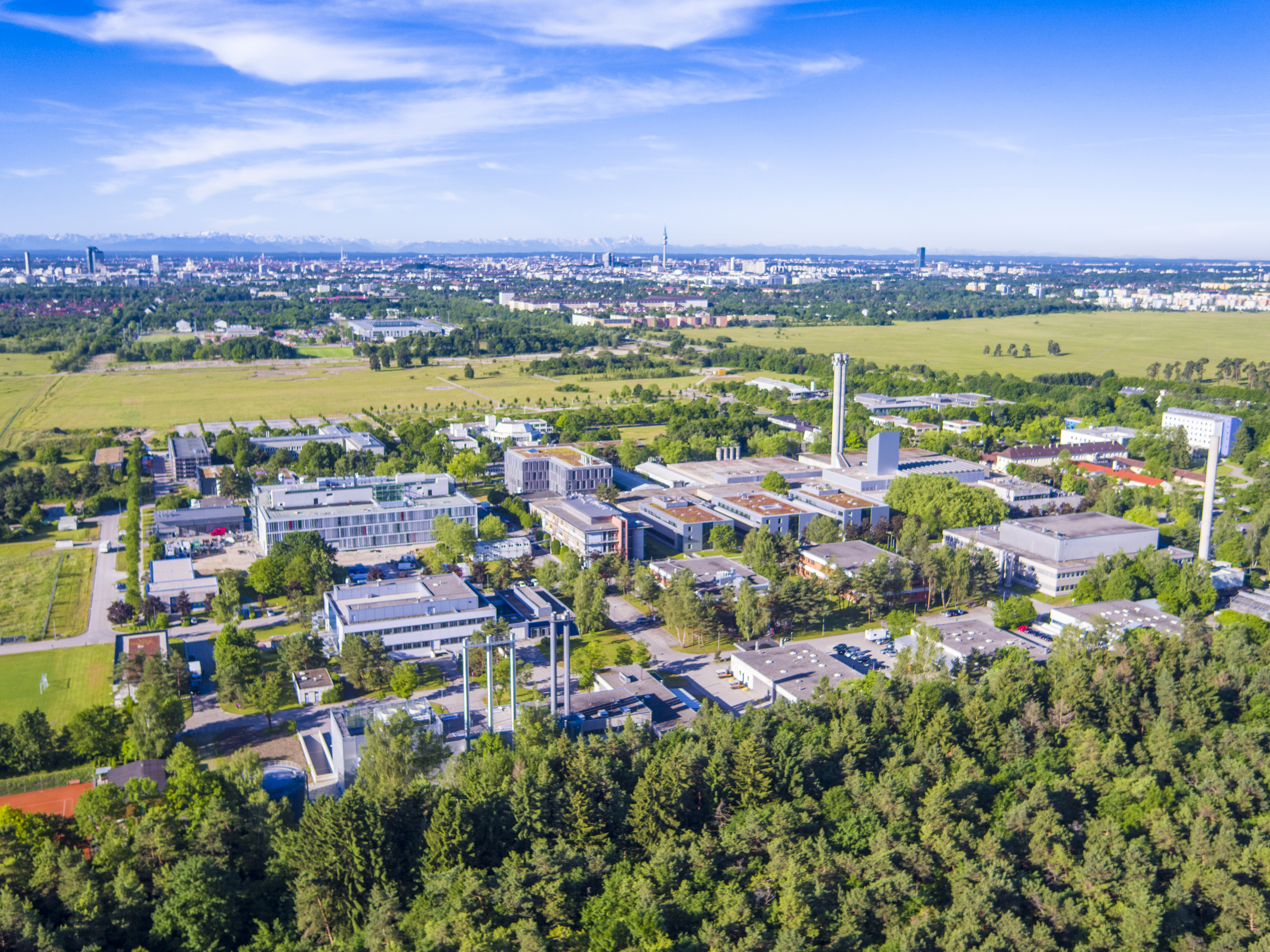
- Campus Helmholtz Munich
- Formation: 1960
- Legal status: GmbH
- Location: Ingolstädter Landstr. 1, 85764 Neuherberg, Germany
- Chairman of the Executive Board: Martin Hrabě de Angelis (interim)
- Administrative Managing Director: Michael Frieser
- Staff: 2555 (2024)
- Website: www.helmholtz-munich.de/en

Helmholtz Zentrum München - Deutsches Forschungszentrum für Gesundheit und Umwelt (GmbH), also known as Helmholtz Munich, is one of Germany's leading non-university centers for biomedical research. It operates as part of Helmholtz Health, the health research division within the Helmholtz Association, Germany's largest scientific organization. Helmholtz Munich primarily focuses on interdisciplinary research in the fields of environmental and metabolic diseases, spanning the full research spectrum from basic science to applied research. The center employs approximately 2,500 staff members (as of 2024) and is headquartered on a campus in northern Munich, covering an area of over 50 hectares.

== Management ==
Helmholtz Munich is represented by its Board of Directors: Member and Spokesperson of the Executive Board (acting): Martin Hrabě de Angelis and Administrative Managing Director: Michael Frieser.

== Campus ==
The main campus is located in Neuherberg, a district of Oberschleißheim, right outside of Munich's city borders. The campus has a size of 52.3 hectares. In addition, the center maintains research facilities inside the city area of Munich, Augsburg, Tübingen, Hanover, Dresden and Leipzig.

== Legal form ==
Helmholtz Zentrum München is a limited liability company according to German law and is financed by a ratio of 90:10 by its two shareholders, the Federal Government and the Free State of Bavaria.

== Research focus ==
Its research focuses primarily on environmental and metabolic diseases, particularly diabetes, -obesity, allergies, and chronic lung diseases. Other centers include:

- Helmholtz Diabetes Center
- Environmental Health Center
- Molecular Targets and Therapeutics Center
- Stem Cell Center
- Bioengineering Center
- Computational Health Center

== Helmholtz Pioneer Campus (HPC) ==
The Helmholtz Pioneer Campus is an interdisciplinary research platform where innovative approaches from the interface between biomedical research, engineering and artificial intelligence are developed. The aim of the Pioneer Campus is to develop solutions for health challenges by combining basic research and applied science and to accelerate the transfer of research results into clinical applications.

== Translational and clinical projects ==
Translational research approaches at the center are developed in cooperation with clinical partners:

- Diabetes Study Center
- Comprehensive Pneumology Center
- Center of Allergy and Environment

== Career development ==
The center has one Helmholtz Graduate School (HELENA) in cooperation with LMU Munich and the Technical University of Munich (TUM), and four Helmholtz Research Schools. The schools offer doctoral students in-depth research in the fields of diabetes, lung and radiation research, epigenetics and data science:

- Helmholtz Graduate School Environmental Health (HELENA)
- International Helmholtz Research School for Diabetes
- EpiCrossBorders: International Helmholtz-Edinburgh Research School for Epigenetics
- CPC-Research School Lung Biology and Disease
- Munich School for Data Science
