= List of RWTH Aachen University people =

This is a list of people associated with RWTH Aachen University in Germany.

== Leibniz Prize awardees ==
- Peter R. Sahm – foundry science 1986
- Norbert Peters – combustion engineering 1990
- Dieter Enders – organic chemistry 1993
- Siegfried Bethke – elementary particle physics 1995
- Wolfgang Marquardt – process engineering 2001
- Wolfgang Dahmen – mathematics 2002
- Rupert Klein – mathematics 2003
- Dierk Raabe – material science 2004
- Martin Beneke – theoretical particle physics 2008
- Leif Kobbelt – computer graphics and multimedia 2013
- Rainer Waser – material science and nanoelectronics 2013

== Scientists ==
=== Engineering science ===
- Bodo von Borries – professor of electrical engineering; co-inventor of the electron microscope
- Philipp Forchheimer (1852–1933) – civil engineering
- B. J. Habibie – Theodhore van Karman Award from International Council for Aeronautical Sciences; honorary member of Gesellschaft Fuer Luft Und Raumfahrt (West Germany); Vice President and Director of Technology at MBB Hamburg; Senior Advisor for Technology on the Board of Directors of MBB – Hamburg
- Otto Intze – professor of hydraulic engineering
- Christoph Ingenhoven – architect
- Hugo Junkers – aviation engineer and manufacturer (1883), International Air & Space Hall of Fame (1976)
- Theodore von Kármán – pioneer of modern aerodynamics
- Ulrich Lemmer – professor of electrical engineering and optoelectronics
- Bernd Lottermoser – director of the Institute of Mineral Resources Engineering
- Y. B. Mangunwijaya – Indonesian architect and novelist
- Georg Menges – former leader of an institute for plastics engineering; creator of Georg-Menges Prize
- Herwart Opitz – professor of machine tools and production engineering
- Karl-Heinz Petzinka – architect and Rector of the Kunstakademie Düsseldorf
- Jesco von Puttkamer – rocket engineer; space exploration technology
- August Ritter – professor of mechanics and astrophysics
- F. A. F. Schmidt – professor of internal combustion engines
- Helena Amélia Oehler Stemmer – Brazilian civil engineer, university professor
- Bernhard Walke – professor of electrical engineering

=== Natural sciences and medicine ===
- Hans Günther Aach – botanist, former director of the Botanical Institute
- Wil van der Aalst — computer scientist
- Friedrich Asinger – chemist, former director of the Institute for Technical and Petrol Chemistry
- Otto Blumenthal – mathematician
- Martin Bojowald – physicist
- Hans-Harald Bolt – Director of the Max-Planck Institute for Plasma Physics
- Julius Bredt – organic chemist, discovered the Bredt's rule
- Nikolas Breuckmann – physicist, recipient of the Maxwell Medal and Prize
- Paul Butzer – mathematician
- Wolfgang Dahmen – mathematician
- Catherine Disselhorst-Klug - biomechanist, Director of the Department of Rehabilitation and Prevention Engineering
- Volker Dohm – physicist, recipient of the Walter Schottky award
- Ubbo Felderhof – theoretical physicist
- Gernot Güntherodt – experimental physicist
- Friedrich Robert Helmert – mathematician and geodesist
- Ludwig Hopf – mathematician and theoretical physicist
- Wilhelm Keim – chemist, former director of the Institute for Technical and Petrol Chemistry
- Martin Kutta – mathematician
- Otto Lehmann – father of liquid crystal research
- Maria Lipp – organic chemist, first female doctoral student, and professor at the RWTH Aachen University
- Hans von Mangoldt – mathematician
- Josef Meixner – physicist
- Walter Metzner – physicist, now CEO of the Max-Planck Institute for Solid State Research
- Renate Meyer (statistician) – Professor of statistics in New Zealand
- Claus Müller – mathematician
- Horst Niemeyer – mathematician
- Dierk Raabe – Director of the Max-Planck Institute for Iron Research
- Ulrich Rüdiger – experimental physicist
- Friedrich Schlögl – theoretical physicist
- Anke Schmeink - mathematician, computer scientist
- Ulrich Schollwöck – physicist
- Jan Schroers — physicist
- Rudolf Schulten (1923–1996) – physicist and father of the Pebble bed reactor
- Walter Selke – theoretical physicist
- Arnold Sommerfeld – professor of applied mathematics, 1900–1906; physicist
- Thomas Thiemann – theoretical physicist
- Dieter Vollhardt – physicist, recipient of the Max-Planck medal
- Matthias Wuttig – experimental physicist
- Ranga Yogeshwar – physicist and science journalist
- Lu Yongxiang – President of the Chinese Academy of Sciences
- Helmut Zahn – chemist; first synthesis of insulin

=== Humanities ===
- Walter Biemel – philosopher
- August von Brandis – artist
- Arnold Gehlen – sociologist
- Hans Glinz – Germanist and linguist
- Lutz F. Hornke – psychological assessment, organizational psychology
- Pia Lamberty – social psychologist and co-founder of the Center for Monitoring, Analysis and Strategy
- Klaus Mehnert – journalist and professor of political science
- Hartwig Neumann (1942–1992) – historian for old buildings and fortresses

== Politicians and public figures ==
=== Politicians ===
- B. J. Habibie – President of Indonesia (1998–1999)
- Necmettin Erbakan – former Turkish Prime minister
- Ulla Schmidt – politician, Federal minister
- Hani Sewilam – Egypt Minister of Water Resources and Irrigation
- Ena von Baer – Chilean journalist, politician; ministry of Segegob (March 2010 – July 2011); designated Senator (July 2011 to date)
- Ulrich Daldrup – Professor of International Law; former Mayor of the City of Aachen
- Hellmuth Greinert – Chief City Director of the City of Essen (1950–1957)
- Noureddin Kianouri (codename: Silvio Macetti) (1933–1939) Iranian architect, urban planner, and Communist political leader
- Saruhan Oluç – politician of the Peoples' Democratic Party (HDP) in Turkey
- Rangin Dadfar Spanta – Afghanistan Secretary of State (since March 2006)

=== Public figures ===
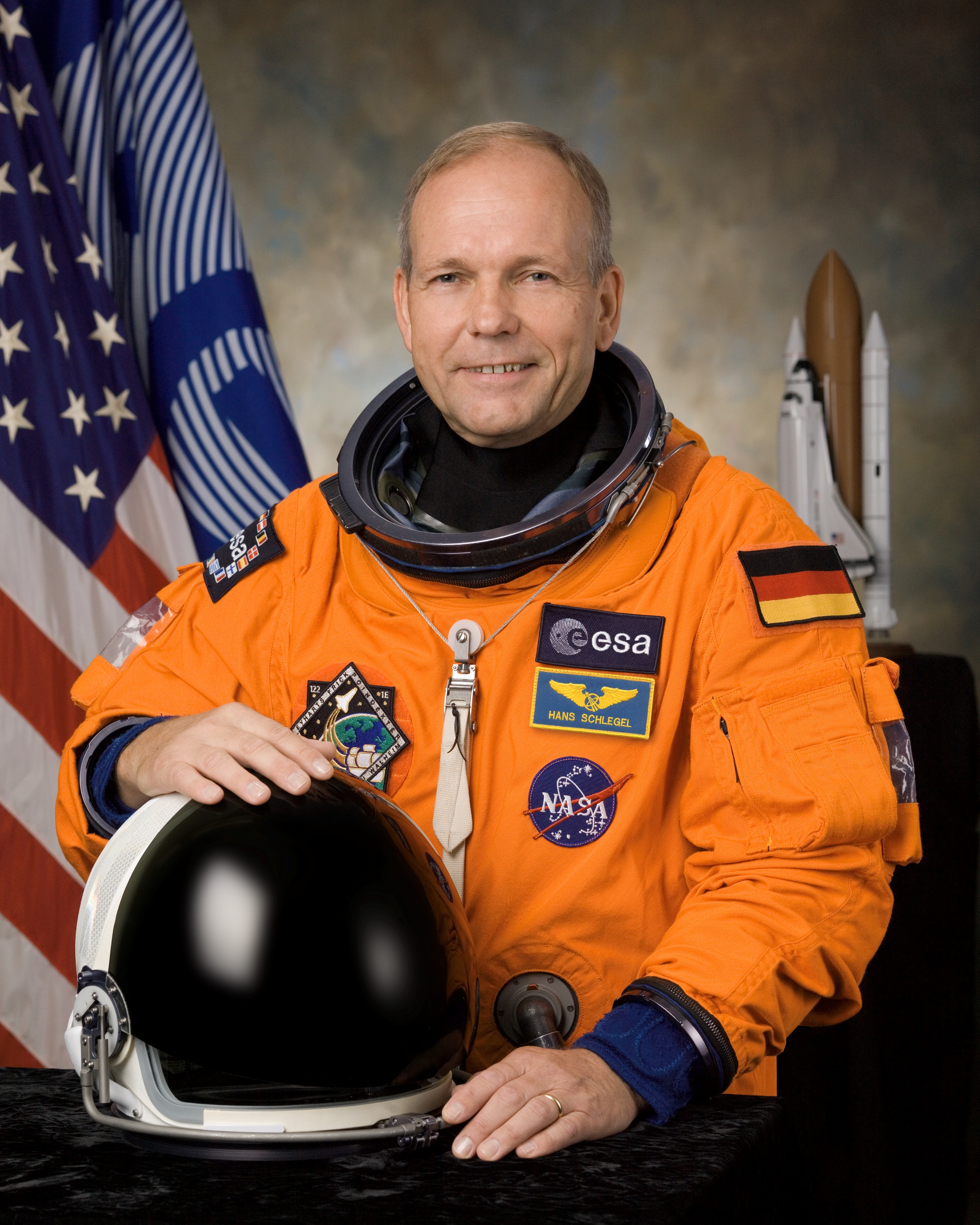
Hans Wilhelm Schlegel – astronaut

- Wolfgang Back – TV journalist
- Young-Sup Huh – President of the Green Cross Corporation, RWTH-Honorary senator
- Hugo Junkers – industrialist and academic
- Karlheinz Kaske – CEO of Siemens AG (1982–1991)
- Theo Lieven – entrepreneur, founder of Vobis
- Jürgen von der Lippe – comedian
- Sonia Mikich – TV correspondent and top editor
- Franz-Josef Paefgen – CEO of Bentley Motors; former CEO of Audi AG
- Kemal Şahin – Turkish entrepreneur (Şahinler Group)
- Hans Wilhelm Schlegel – astronaut
- Hans Ernst Schneider/Hans Schwerte – Rector of RWTH under fake name (1970–1973); identified as a former SS member, and all his rights were revoked
- Ulrich Schumacher – former CEO of Infineon (2000–2004)
- Mario Theissen – boss of BMW's Formula One racing division
- Wendelin Wiedeking – former CEO of Porsche; member in the supervisory board of Volkswagen
