= ComNets =

Former university department in Germany

ComNets (Communication Networks), a chair of RWTH Aachen University, is a former university department in Germany working on Mobile Communications. Head of ComNets was Bernhard Walke. Research projects are mainly funded by third parties like national and European boards and communication industries. The research activities of about 40 fully employed research assistants are focused on design and further development as well as quantitative performance analysis of mobile communication systems like GPRS, TETRA, EDGE, UMTS, Next Generation, Dedicated Short Range Communication Systems, Hybrid Systems, Ad hoc and Multi-hop WLAN, HiperLAN/2, HiperMAN, mobile Satellite and High-Altitude Platforms. Stochastic simulation based on emulated protocol stacks and traffic theory are the main analysis methods. Essential results of ComNets' work have been incorporated into the standards ETSI-GPRS, CEN-DSRC, ETSI/HiperLAN/2, IEEE 802.11 e/h/s.

== See also ==
- Communications in Germany
- P3 Solutions GmbH (2001–2009) aka P3 communications GmbH (2009–2019) aka umlaut communications GmbH (2019–), a company founded by ComNets members
