= Bernhard Walke =

Bernhard H. Walke
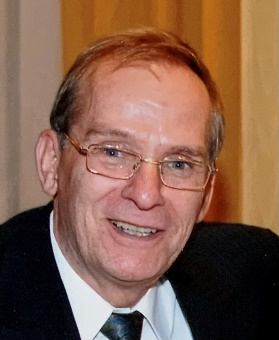
- Bernhard Walke at RWTH Aachen
- Born: 28 July 1940

Bernhard H. Walke (born 28 July 1940 in Neisse, Upper Silesia) is a pioneer of mobile Internet access and professor emeritus at RWTH Aachen University in Germany. He is a driver of wireless and mobile 2G to 5G cellular radio networks technologies. In 1985, he proposed a local cellular radio network comprising technologies in use today in 2G, 4G and discussed for 5G systems. For example, self-organization of a radio mesh network, integration of circuit- and packet switching, de-centralized radio resource control, TDMA/spread spectrum data transmission, antenna beam steering, spatial beam multiplexing, interference coordination, S-Aloha based multiple access and demand assigned traffic channels, mobile broadband transmission using mm-waves, and multi-hop communication.

In 1991, he proposed CELLPAC for packet switching in GSM which triggered development of ETSI standard GPRS. GPRS air-interface protocols follow a 1993 version of CELLPAC. In 1999, he proposed fixed two-hop decode-and-forward relays for cellular radio, now mandatory in standards 3GPP LTE Rel.10 and IEEE 802.16.1 (mobile broadband WiMAX). The relay concept triggered evolution of cellular radio architecture towards 3GPP LTE Small Cell networks, e.g. femto and pico cells operating like relays on radio resources provided by a donor base station.

The Communications Networks (ComNets) research team in large parts designed the ETSI/BRAN HiperLAN2 medium access control protocol adopted by standard IEEE 802.16 (WiMax) and used as a baseline in 3GPP LTE-Advanced. Radio spectrum requirements for packet-switching mobile radio systems were calculated by World Radio Conference 2007 using a queuing model developed by Walke and his team. Work by Walke and his team on wireless quality of service supporting multi-hop radio networks materialized in standard IEEE 802.11s.

Walke earned his Dipl. Ing. (M.Sc.) degree in Electrical Engineering and Data Processing (1965) from University of Stuttgart, Germany. He worked two years as a trainee with Telefunken and joined Telefunken Research (1967) where he received his doctorate (1975) from University of Stuttgart. As a department head in 1983 at AEG Telefunken (later taken-over in part by Airbus), he moved to FernUniversität Hagen, Germany, as a professor for data processing techniques. During 1990–2007, he was professor and director of the School of Communications Networks (ComNets) at RWTH Aachen's Faculty of Electrical Engineering and Information Technology until 2017 where he was head of the ComNets Research Group.

== P3 Solutions and P3 communications ==
In 2001, Walke, together with his ComNets colleagues Marc Peter Althoff and Peter Seidenberg and the Aachen-based P3 - Ingenieurgesellschaft für Management und Organisation mbH as investor and manager represented through Michael Tobias, was one of the founders of the P3 Solutions GmbH to offer consulting services to mobile network providers and vendors and the public sector, although he didn't play an active role in the day-to-day business of the company. On 31 July 2009, the company absorbed its sister P3 networks GmbH to become P3 communications GmbH. In the 2010s, Walke sold his shares in the company. On 10 January 2019, when the holding company P3 group GmbH (the successor of the P3 Ingenieurgesellschaft mbH) split into the Aachen-headquartered P3 group AG (which was renamed into umlaut AG on 25 October 2019 and firms as umlaut SE since 22 October 2020) and the newly founded P3 global GmbH based in Stuttgart (which was renamed (back) into P3 group GmbH on 20 January 2020), the core of the company stayed with umlaut and was renamed into umlaut communications GmbH. On 14 June 2021, it was announced that umlaut SE would become part of Accenture's Industry X endeavour.

== Awards ==
- IEEE Fellow 2016 "for contributions to packet switching and relaying in cellular mobile systems"
- ITG Award 1975 (Best annual paper award of Information Technology Society in VDE (Society of Electrical Engineers) in Germany)
