= RWTH Aachen Faculty of Computer Science =

University faculty in Aachen, Germany

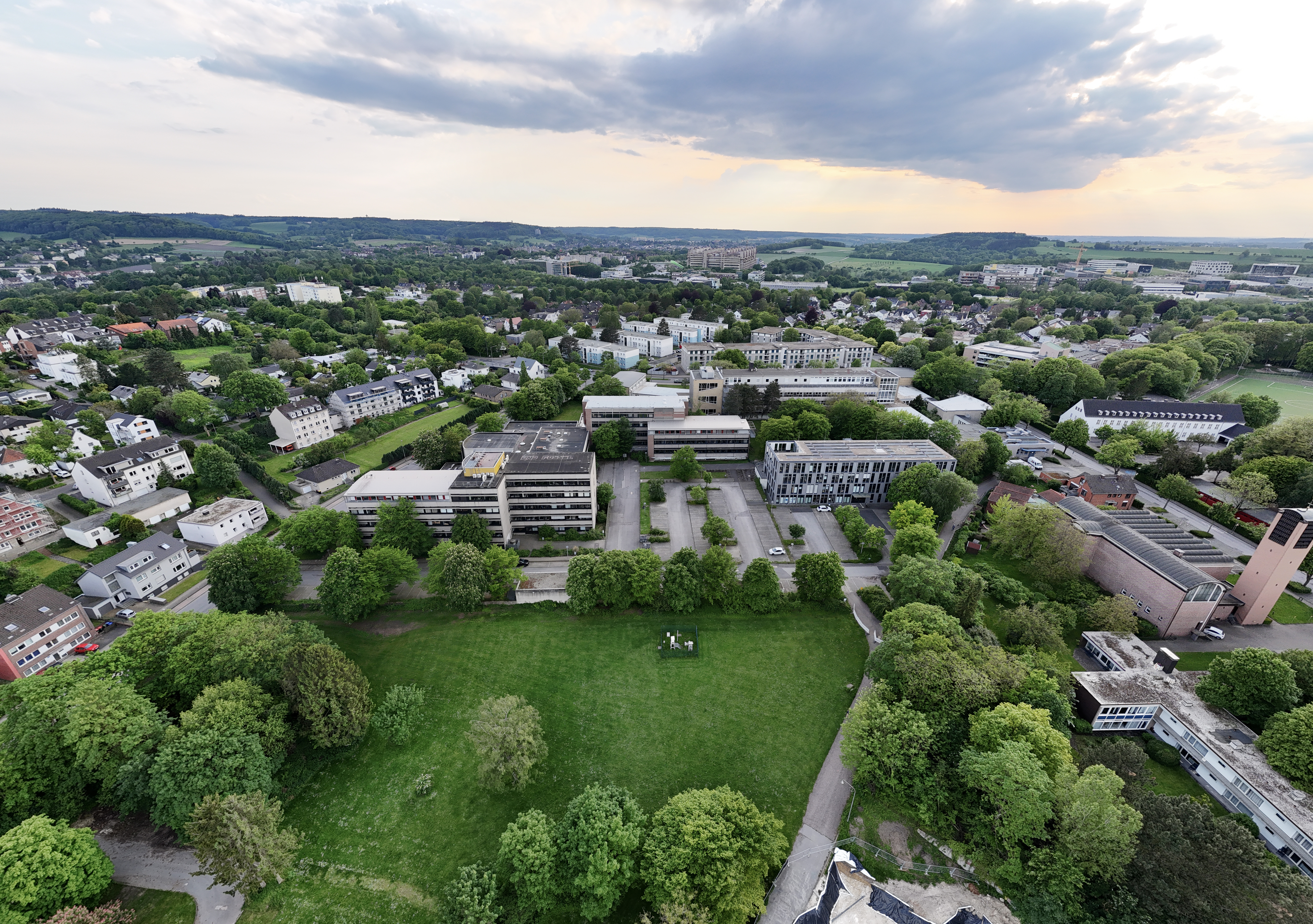
Computer Science Center

The Faculty of Computer science is a faculty of the RWTH Aachen University. The faculty was founded in 2025, though computer science has been taught at the university since 1972.

== History ==
=== Founding ===
The faculty was founded in 2025 and is the first faculty to be founded at the university since 1966.

=== Previous status ===
Previously, it was part of the RWTH Aachen Faculty of Mathematics, Computer Science and Natural Sciences, which has since been renamed to the Faculty of Mathematics and Natural Sciences.

Computer science was added to the curriculum in 1972 and was then added to the Faculty of Mathematics and Natural Sciences as a new department in 1986. It has since become a large part of the university with national and international recognition.

=== Students ===
At the time of the split, its students made up 50% of the students of the Faculty of Mathematics and Natural Sciences.
