= Rainer Waser =

German electrical engineer (born 1955)

Rainer Waser (born 16 September 1955, in Frankfurt) is a German professor of Electrical Engineering at RWTH Aachen University. He is also director of the section Electronic Materials at the Peter Grünberg Institute which is located on the campus of Jülich Research Center (Forschungszentrum Jülich). His research and teaching is on solid-state chemistry and defect chemistry to electronic properties and modelling, the technology of new materials and the physical properties of construction components.

Important findings include insights in the functioning of the so-called memristors.

Waser grew up in Heusenstamm near Frankfurt. He studied Physical Chemistry at Darmstadt University of Technology where he received a diploma degree in 1979. Then he went to the University of Southampton to conduct research at the Institute of Electrochemistry. After that he turned to Darmstadt and worked as scientific assistant until he completed his PhD.

== Career ==
Waser joined the Philips research laboratories (research group Electronic Ceramics) at Aachen. In 1992, Waser accepted a Chair for Electronic Materials in the Faculty of Electrical Science and Information Technology at RWTH Aachen University. In 2012, Waser was elected to the post of Speaker of the Department of Electrical Engineering and Information Technology at Aachen university. Waser was awarded the renowned Gottfried Wilhelm Leibniz Prize in 2014.

== Awards and honors ==
A comprehensive list can be found in the cv on the institute's website.

- 2015 – Honorary doctorate from the University of Silesia in Katowice
- 2014 – Tsungming-Tu Prize, awarded by the National Science Council in Taiwan (the country's highest academic distinction which can be bestowed on non-Taiwanese citizens)
- 2014 – Gottfried Wilhelm Leibniz Prize
- 2007 – Masao Ikeda Award, Ikeda Memorial Foundation, Kyoto, Japan
- 2001 – Outstanding Achievements Award, International Symposium on Integrated Ferroelectrics (ISIF)
- 2000 – Ferroelectrics Recognition Award, IEEE Ultrasonics, Ferroelectrics, and Frequency Control Society

== Fellowships and Academy Membership ==
- Fellow of the North-Rhine Westphalian Academy of Sciences, Humanities and the Arts.
- Spokesperson of the section Future information technology (FIT) within the Helmholtz-Zentrum Berlin

== Other Functions ==
- Executive Advisory Board Member of the journal Advanced Functional Materials

== Selected works ==
- Valov, I.; Linn, E.; Tappertzhofen, S.; Schmelzer, S.; van den Hurk, J.; Lentz, F.; Waser, R. (23 April 2013). "Nanobatteries in redox-based resistive switches require extension of memristor theory". Nature Communications. 4 (1). Springer Science and Business Media LLC: 1771. arXiv:1303.2589. Bibcode:2013NatCo...4.1771V. doi:10.1038/ncomms2784. ISSN 2041-1723. PMC 3644102. PMID 23612312.
- Waser, Rainer (2003). Nanoelectronics and information technology: advanced electronic materials and novel devices. Weinheim: Wiley-VCH. ISBN 978-3-527-40363-9. OCLC 50056108.
- Menzel, Stephan; Waters, Matthias; Marchewka, Astrid; Böttger, Ulrich; Dittmann, Regina; Waser, Rainer (26 September 2011). "Origin of the Ultra-nonlinear Switching Kinetics in Oxide-Based Resistive Switches". Advanced Functional Materials. 21 (23). Wiley: 4487–4492. doi:10.1002/adfm.201101117. ISSN 1616-301X. S2CID 96936658.
- Tappertzhofen, S; Linn, E; Nielen, L; Rosezin, R; Lentz, F; Bruchhaus, R; Valov, I; Böttger, U; Waser, R (5 September 2011). "Capacity based nondestructive readout for complementary resistive switches". Nanotechnology. 22 (39) 395203. IOP Publishing. Bibcode:2011Nanot..22M5203T. doi:10.1088/0957-4484/22/39/395203. ISSN 0957-4484. PMID 21891857. S2CID 12305490.
- Schmid, Günter (2008). Nanotechnology. Weinheim Chichester: Wiley-VCH John Wiley, distributor. ISBN 978-3-527-31738-7. OCLC 212432089.
