= RWTH Aachen Faculty of Georesources and Materials Engineering =

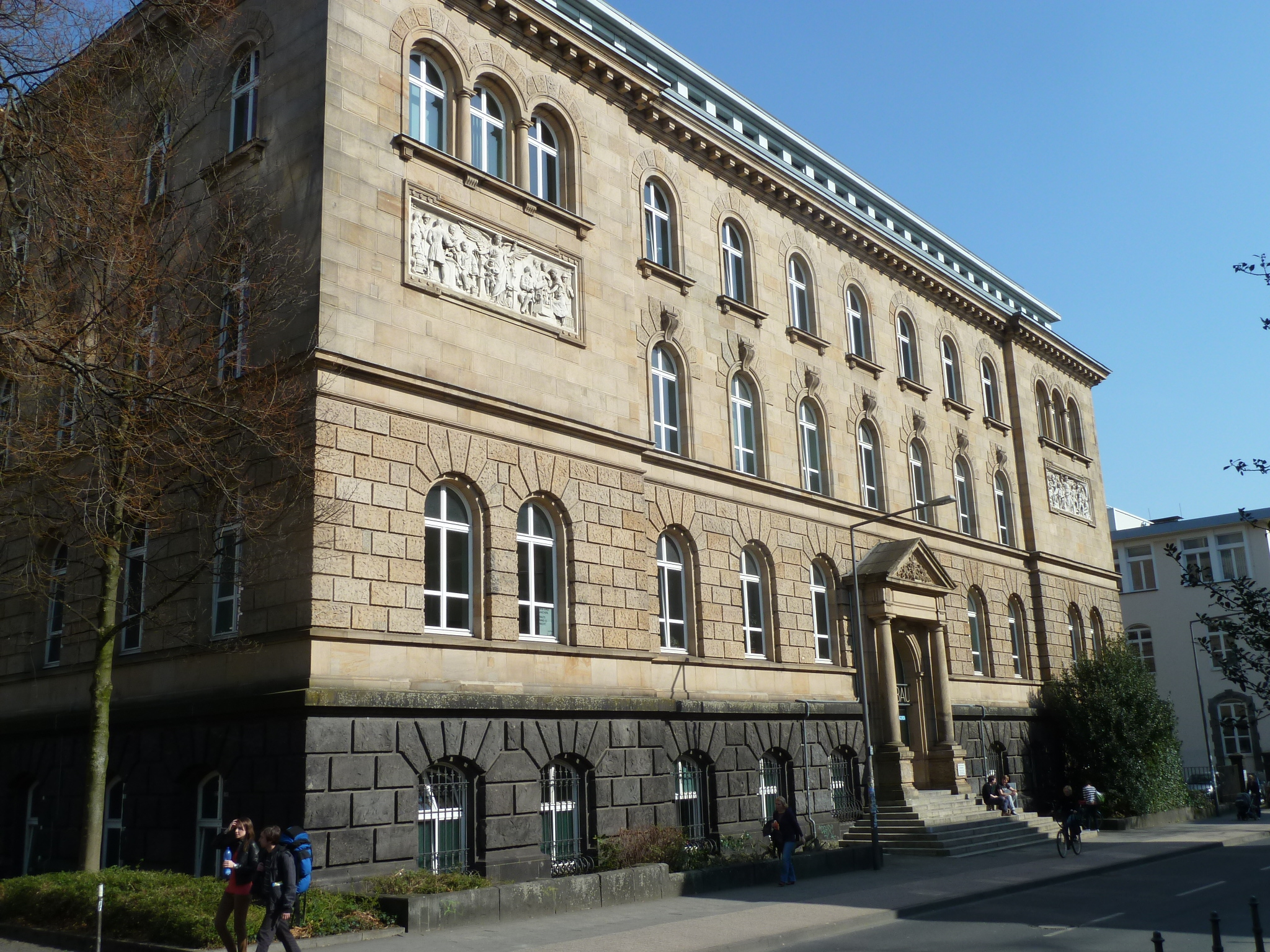
Main building of RWTH Aachen Faculty of Georesources and Materials Engineering, formerly Faculty of Mining.

The Faculty of Georesources and Materials Engineering is one of nine faculties at the RWTH Aachen University. It comprises three sections for Raw Materials and Waste Disposal Technology, Metallurgy and Materials Technology and Geoscience and Geology. The faculty was found in 1880 and produced several notable individuals, including Friedrich Robert Helmert. Approximately 3,000 students are enrolled in the faculty.

== Degrees awarded ==
The following degrees are awarded in Geoscience and Geography, Raw Materials and Waste Disposal Technology, or Metallurgy and Materials Technology:

- Bachelor of Science
- Master of Science
- Diplom
- Doctor

== History ==
Already with the establishment of the RWTH Aachen as the Königlich Rheinisch Westphälische Polytechnische Schule zu Aachen on October 10, 1870, the chairs for mining and metallurgy were set up beside the fields of building construction, hydraulic construction as well as road and railway construction. A chemistry laboratory was also among the facilities. Around the turn of the 20th century, the chair of metallurgy of iron (German: Eisenhüttenwesen) developed to a center of leading technology.

After the transformation of the institution into a technical university, the fourth faculty was formed as the Faculty of Mining, Chemistry and Metallurgy (German: Fakultät für Bergbau, Chemie und Hüttenkunde). The department of Chemistry remained until 1940 within the faculty to be incorporated then into the Faculty of Natural Sciences. The faculty was later renamed Faculty of Mining, Metallurgy and Geosciences (German: Fakultät für Bergbau, Hüttenkunde und Geowissenschaften).

The RWTH Aachen University was one of the only three technological institutions in Germany, the others being Technische Universität Berlin and Clausthal University of Technology, featuring the disciplines of mining and metallurgy.
