= Mass media in Germany =

Mass media in Germany includes a variety of online, print, and broadcast formats, such as radio, television, newspapers, and magazines.

== History ==
The modern printing press developed in Mainz in the 15th century, and its innovative technology spread quickly throughout Europe and the world. In the 20th century period prior and during World War II, mass media propaganda in Nazi Germany was prevalent. Since the 1980s a "dual system of public and commercial" broadcasting has replaced the previous public system.

The German Press Council (Deutscher Presserat) introduced a Press Code (Pressekodex) in 1972. Since 2017 this Code has an amendment (12.1), which says that, „when reporting on crimes, care must be taken to ensure that mentioning the ethnic, religious, or other minority groups of suspects or perpetrators does not lead to a discriminatory generalization of individual misconduct. As a general rule, mention of such groups should not be made unless there is a legitimate public interest. Particular attention should be paid to the fact that mentioning such groups could fuel prejudice against minorities.“

== Newspapers ==
As of 2015, widely read national newspapers include Süddeutsche Zeitung, Frankfurter Allgemeine Zeitung, Die Welt, and Bild. "Germans are voracious readers of newspapers and periodicals.... The economic state of Germany's several hundred newspapers and thousands of periodicals is enviably healthy. Most major cities support two or more daily newspapers, in addition to community periodicals, and few towns of any size are without their own daily newspaper."

Bild is the largest highest-selling newspaper in Germany. The paper is published from Monday to Saturday; on Sundays, its sister paper Bild am Sonntag ("Bild on Sunday") is published instead, which has a different style and its own editors. Bild is tabloid in style but broadsheet in size. It is the best-selling European newspaper and has the sixteenth-largest circulation worldwide. Bild has been described as "notorious for its mix of gossip, inflammatory language, and sensationalism" and as having a huge influence on German politicians. Its nearest English-language stylistic and journalistic equivalent is often considered to be the British national newspaper The Sun, the second-highest-selling European tabloid newspaper.

== Radio ==
The first "radio program in Germany was broadcast on October 29, 1923, in Berlin."

== Video games ==
The German video gaming market is one of the largest in the world. The Gamescom in Cologne is the world's leading gaming convention. Popular game series from Germany include Turrican, the Anno series, The Settlers series, the Gothic series, SpellForce, the FIFA Manager series, Far Cry and Crysis. Relevant game developers and publishers are Blue Byte, Crytek, Deep Silver, Kalypso Media, Piranha Bytes, Yager Development, and some of the largest social network game companies like Bigpoint, Gameforge, Goodgame and Wooga.

== See also ==
- Germany: media
- Mass media in Germany by city
  - Media in Berlin
- Journalism in Germany
- Cinema of Germany
- Concentration of media ownership in Germany
- Internet in Germany
- Telecommunications in Germany
- German literature
- Category:East German mass media, 1949–1990

== Bibliography ==
- Peter Humphreys (1994). Media and Media Policy in Germany (2nd ed.). ISBN 0854968539.
- Euromedia Research Group; Mary Kelly; et al., eds. (2004). "Germany". Media in Europe (3rd ed.). SAGE Publications. ISBN 978-0-7619-4132-3.
- Mass Media, Culture and Society in Twentieth-Century Germany. Palgrave Macmillan. 2006. ISBN 978-0-230-80093-9.
- Ross Eaman (2009). "Germany". Historical Dictionary of Journalism. Scarecrow Press. ISBN 978-0-8108-6289-0.
- Jürgen Wilke [in German] (2015). "Germany: Media System". In Wolfgang Donsbach [in German] (ed.). Concise Encyclopedia of Communication. John Wiley & Sons. ISBN 978-1-118-78923-0.
- "Germany", Freedom of the Press, US: Freedom House, 2016, OCLC 57509361
