= RWTH Aachen Faculty of Arts and Humanities =

The Faculty of Arts and Humanities is one of nine faculties at the RWTH Aachen University. It was found in 1965 and produced several notable individuals like Arnold Gehlen or Klaus Mehnert. Approximately 4,000 students are enrolled in the faculty. Since 2022, the Dean of the Faculty is Professor Torsten Voigt.

As located at a Technical University there are exceptional strong ties between the Humanities and Engineering in research and teaching. Only one example for this is the interdisciplinary academic program "Technical Communication" (in German "Technik-Kommunikation"), which was founded in 1999 and is coordinated by Professor Eva-Maria Jakobs. The program is a cooperation of five Faculties at RWTH Aachen University.

== Degrees awarded ==
The faculty awards the following academic degrees:

- Bachelor of Science
- Master of Science
- Bachelor of Arts
- Master of Arts
- Doctor
