= Paul Deurenberg =

Dutch physician

- Occupations: Academic, nutritional biochemist and consultant

Academic background
- Education: BSc, chemistry MSc, chemistry and biochemistry PhD, chemistry
- Alma mater: Rheinisch Westfalische Technische Hochschule (RWTH) Aachen University

Paul Deurenberg is a Dutch retired academic, nutritional biochemist and consultant. He was a former associate professor in the Department of Human Nutrition at Wageningen University (WU), and is most known for his research expertise in the areas of energy metabolism, food consumption, and body composition studies.

== Education ==
Deurenberg obtained a Bachelor of Science degree in chemistry from the Rheinisch Westfalische Technische Hochschule in Aachen, Germany in 1969. He then received a Master of Science degree in Chemistry and Biochemistry from the same institution in 1971, followed by a PhD in chemistry in 1973. He completed a post-doctoral course in Nutrition in Maastricht, the Netherlands in 1979, and a Summer Course in Epidemiology and Biostatistics at the New England Epidemiological Institute in Amherst, Massachusetts, United States in 1981.

== Career ==
Deurenberg started as a lecturer in biochemistry and nutrition at the School for Dieticians in Heerlen, the Netherlands, where he worked from 1969 to 1980. During this period, he served as a Senior Lecturer at the same institution from 1975 to 1980. In 1980, he was appointed as an associate professor at the Department of Human Nutrition at Wageningen University (WU), and held that appointment till 2002.

== Research ==
Deurenberg's research integrates the fields of biochemistry, physiology and nutritional epidemiology with a particular focus on the areas of energy metabolism, body composition, and food consumption, resulting in more than 450 journal papers as author or co-author.

=== Body composition ===
Deurenberg has researched body composition with a primary interest in body fat and its distribution, as well as body water and its distribution. He has conducted body composition studies across all age groups, from childhood to the elderly, and in various settings such as epidemiological studies, laboratory studies, and medical settings. In one of his highly cited papers, he examined the application of bioelectrical impedance analysis (BIA), and explored its underlying principles and methods. The study also presented validated equations and underscored the need for standardized methods and quality control procedures, as their absence poses a challenge to the use of BIA among both healthy individuals and patients. Addressing the use of BIA in clinical practice, his joint studies determined that although bioelectrical impedance analysis (BIA) is effective in healthy individuals and those with chronic diseases when using an age-, sex-, and race-appropriate equation, it is not recommended for routine patient assessment in those with abnormal hydration or extreme body mass index (BMI) ranges.

In his work inspired by Durnin and Womersley's paper, Deurenberg created formulas that assessed body fat percentage (BF%) using BMI measurements. It was established that BMI has limitations in assessing body fatness due to differences in body composition between genders, age-related differences, and varying correlations between BMI and body fat percentage across ethnic groups. He also collaborated with University of Glasgow researchers to develop new equations using stepwise-multiple-regression analysis to predict body composition through densitometry using simple anthropometric measurements. Following this research, he highlighted a need for population-specific BMI cut-off points for obesity prevention and management due to the variations in the relationship between percent body fat and BMI across different ethnic groups. Directing his research efforts further on evaluating the ethnic differences in body composition, he noted that there are significant differences between Asians and Caucasians in their BMI and BF% relationship and also among the three major ethnic groups in Singapore, as well as differences among different Asian ethnicities, In related research, he found significant differences in BF% measured by different methods, with hydrometry identified as the best suited single method, and observed differences among Singaporean Chinese, Malays and Indians due to differences in composition of FFM. He also emphasized that ethnicity-specific factors should be considered when assessing health risks associated with weight status. Another focus of his research was exploring the constancy of fat-free body mass hydration where he analyzed in vitro and in vivo data supporting the hydration constancy hypothesis and critiqued applied methodology.

=== Energy metabolism ===
Deurenberg's research on energy metabolism has focused on the complex mechanisms governing resting metabolic rate and diet-induced thermogenesis as well. He has studied differences between abdominal and gluteal-femoral obese women before and after weight reduction in these components, analyzed diurnal variation, and looked into the impact of psychological stress on them. In similar studies, he has assessed how body composition, fat distribution, physical activity level relate to resting metabolic rate (RMR) and diet-induced thermogenesis (DIT) in young and elderly subjects, finding age effects on RMR but not on DIT.

Deurenberg's research also focuses on investigating the relationship between body fat distribution, energy expenditure, and weight loss in women, across different age groups. When examining the impact of obesity and body fat distribution on resting energy expenditure in women, it was reported that non-abdominal obese women have reduced resting metabolic rates compared to both abdominal obese and non-obese women. His early research has argued that in obese people, the relationship between visceral fat accumulation and the energy expenditure components (RMR and DIT) may vary depending on gender, and emphasized the significance of personalized approaches over population-level data in estimating energy expenditure, recommending individual calibration curves using a variety of activities for best results. Furthermore, his work compares energy expenditure between different age groups and during rest and activities, to gain a better understanding of the factors influencing energy expenditure and weight loss in women.

== Selected articles ==
- Deurenberg, P., Weststrate, J. A., & Seidell, J. C. (1991). Body mass index as a measure of body fatness: age-and sex-specific prediction formulas. British journal of nutrition, 65(2), 105–114.
- Deurenberg, P., Yap, M., & Van Staveren, W. A. (1998). Body mass index and percent body fat: a meta analysis among different ethnic groups. International journal of obesity, 22(12), 1164–1171.
- Deurenberg, P., Deurenberg‐Yap, M., & Guricci, S. (2002). Asians are different from Caucasians and from each other in their body mass index/body fat per cent relationship. Obesity reviews, 3(3), 141–146.
- Kyle, U. G., Bosaeus, I., De Lorenzo, A. D., Deurenberg, P., Elia, M., Gómez, J. M., ... & Composition of the ESPEN Working Group. (2004). Bioelectrical impedance analysis—part I: review of principles and methods. Clinical nutrition, 23(5), 1226–1243.
- Kyle, U. G., Bosaeus, I., De Lorenzo, A. D., Deurenberg, P., Elia, M., Gómez, J. M., ... & Pichard, C. (2004). Bioelectrical impedance analysis—part II: utilization in clinical practice. Clinical nutrition, 23(6), 1430–1453.
