= Telecommunications in Germany =

Overview of telecommunications in the Federal Republic of Germany

Telecommunications in Germany is highly developed. The German telecommunication market has been fully liberalized since January 1, 1998. Germany is served by an extensive system of automatic telephone exchanges connected by modern networks of fiber-optic cable, coaxial cable, microwave radio relay, and a domestic satellite system; cellular telephone service is widely available, expanding rapidly, and includes roaming service to foreign countries. As a result of intensive capital expenditures since reunification, the formerly antiquated system of the eastern part of the country has been rapidly modernized to the most advanced technology. Deutsche Telekom began rolling out FTTH networks in ten cities in 2011, following the launch of pilot projects in Hennigsdorf, Braunschweig and Dresden in 2010.

== Fixed-line telephony ==
Fixed-line subscriber base
Year	Subscribers (millions)
2002	53.7
2003	54.2
2004	54.5
2005	54.8
2006	54.3
2007	53.1
2008	51.0
2009	48.5
2010	46.5

The German telecommunication network employs an extensive system of network elements such as digital telephone exchanges, mobile switching centres, media gateways and signalling gateways at the core, interconnected by a wide variety of transmission systems using fibre-optics or Microwave radio relay networks. The access network, which connects the subscribers to the core, is diversified with a variety of copper-pair, optic-fibre, and wireless technologies. The fixed-line telecommunications market is dominated by the former state-owned monopoly Deutsche Telekom. Since the mid-2000s, fixed-line installations have been in decline. Today's market players usually own and operate their own physical networks, which is a result of the previous state-owned monopoly. Such a player is termed an asset-based carrier. The number of suppliers is low as few companies have the ability to supply complex, reliable, and geographically extensive networks.

Fixed-line market share
Company	Market share
Deutsche Telekom	81.5%
Vodafone	10.1%
Versatel	2.6%
Others	5.7%

== Mobile phone ==
The mobile phone market in Germany is dominated by 3 main cellular operators: Telekom (a subsidiary of Deutsche Telekom and branded as T-Mobile between 2002 and 2010), Vodafone, Telefónica Germany (branded as O2; and includes the former E-Plus network of Telefónica Germany).

Deutsche Telekom AG launched LTE in late 2010. Network roll out began following the "digital dividend" spectrum auction which ended May 20, 2010. In December 2010 Vodafone Germany commercially launched its first LTE network in rural areas using 800 MHz it won in the May 2010 auction. In late 2011 the company began rolling out the network in metropolitan areas with the federal state's capital Düsseldorf has been selected as one location because Vodafone's development center is situated there and because of the city's extensive fibre-optic network, which will be used to connect LTE base stations. Krefeld has been chosen as a second LTE rollout location because it is relatively flat and only a few base stations would be required to cover its roughly 250,000 residents.

== Radio ==
Broadcasting in the Federal Republic of Germany is reserved under the Basic Law (constitution) to the states. This means that all public broadcasting is regionalised. National broadcasts must be aired through the national consortium of public broadcasters (ARD) or authorized by a treaty negotiated between the states.

== Internet ==
The DSL infrastructure is highly developed. Cable internet based on DOCSIS technology was not available until the mid-2000s, because the cable television infrastructure was owned by Deutsche Telekom, which promoted DSL and neglected the cable network. It was sold after political pressure a few years ago, and is now owned by Kabel Deutschland and Unitymedia Kabel BW.

== See also ==
- Media of Germany
- ComNets
