= Jan Schroers =

German physicist and professor

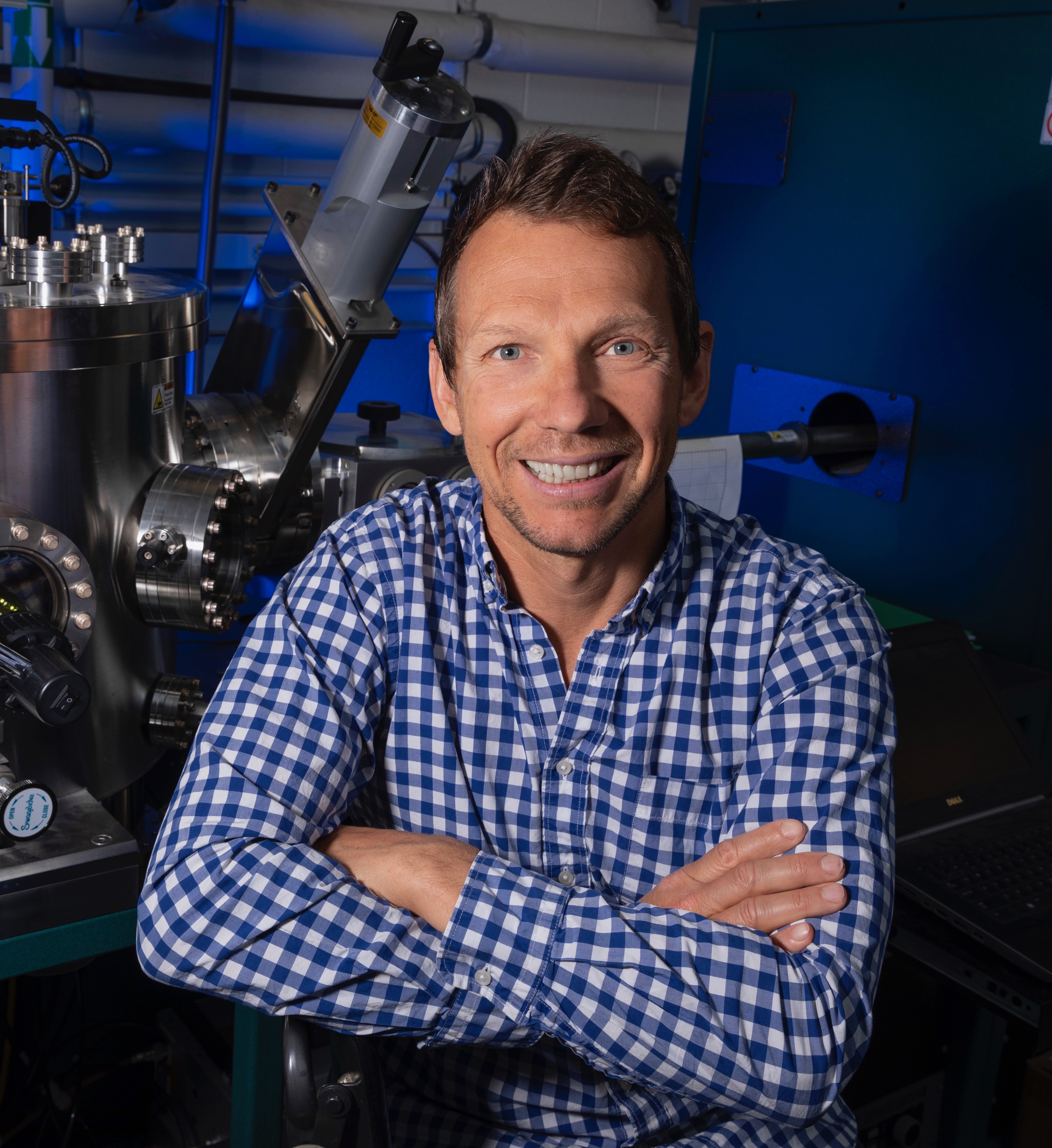
- Occupations: Physicist; Known For: Metallic Glasses, Nanofabrication, Combinatorial Materials Science
- Awards: Lee Hsun Award, Chinese Academy of Sciences

Academic background
- Education: University of Cologne; RWTH Aachen University

Jan Schroers (born 19 July 1967) is a German physicist who is the Robert Higgin Professor of Mechanical Engineering and Materials Science at Yale University. His research focuses on materials science and materials discovery.

== Early life and education ==
Schroers was born on 19 July 1967 in Cologne, Germany. He earned his BS and MS at University of Cologne, Germany, in Physics in 1994 before attending RWTH Aachen University, where he earned his Ph.D. in 1997. Schroers conducted his postdoctoral fellowship at California Institute of Technology in Materials Science from 1998 to 2002.

== Career ==
Schroers joined the faculty of Materials Science and Engineering at Yale University in 2006 as an associate professor. In 2012 he was promoted to full professor with tenure. His focus has been on metallic glasses, specifically he discovered and explained ductile metallic glasses, and developed bulk glasses based on gold, and high temperature metallic glasses.

Schroers has also developed nanofabrication methods enabling nanomolding of metallic glasses and recently novel methods that are ubiquitously applicable to all metals and many other materials. His focus on processing of advanced materials includes blow-molding of metallic glasses which allows to shape metallic glasses like plastics.

In 2023, Schoers was named Robert Higgin Chair of Mechanical Engineering and Materials Science at School of Engineering & Applied Science, Yale University.

Schroers has also been involved in commercial enterprises including Liquidmetal Technologies, Supercool Metals and Desktop Metal.

== Awards and honors ==
- 2017 – Lee Hsun Award, Chinese Academy of Science
