= RWTH Aachen Faculty of Civil Engineering =

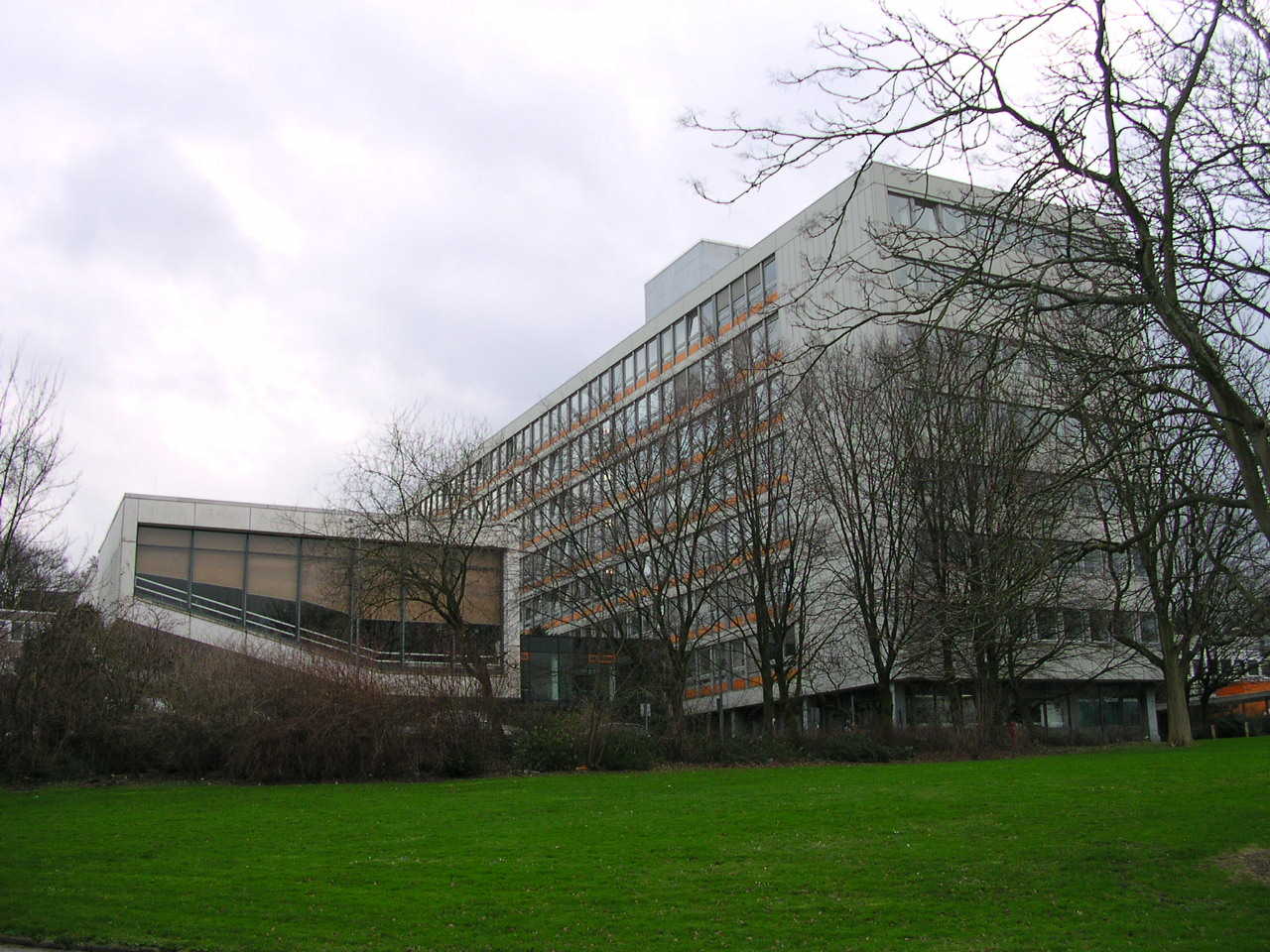
The central building of the Faculty of Civil Engineering

The Faculty of Civil Engineering is one of nine faculties at the RWTH Aachen University. It was founded in 1880 and produced several notable individuals like Philipp Forchheimer. Approximately 1,000 students are enrolled in the faculty.

== Degrees awarded ==
The following Degrees are awarded in civil engineering and industrial engineering:

- Bachelor of Science
- Master of Science
- Diplom
- Doctor
