= Media in Berlin =

Berlin is a major media centre in Germany and Europe.

== Broadcasting ==
It is home to many international and regional television and radio stations. The public broadcaster RBB has its headquarters in Berlin next to commercial broadcasters MTV Europe and Welt. German international public broadcaster Deutsche Welle has its TV production unit in Berlin, and most national German broadcasters have a studio in the city including RTL.

== Print ==
Berlin has Germany's largest number of daily newspapers, with numerous local broadsheets (Berliner Morgenpost, Berliner Zeitung, Der Tagesspiegel), and three major tabloids, as well as national dailies of varying sizes, each with a different political affiliation, such as Die Welt, Junge Welt, Neues Deutschland, and Die Tageszeitung. The Exberliner, a monthly magazine, is Berlin's English-language periodical focusing on arts and entertainment. Berlin headquarters two major German-language publishing houses Walter de Gruyter and Springer, each of which publish books, periodicals, and multimedia products.

== Film ==
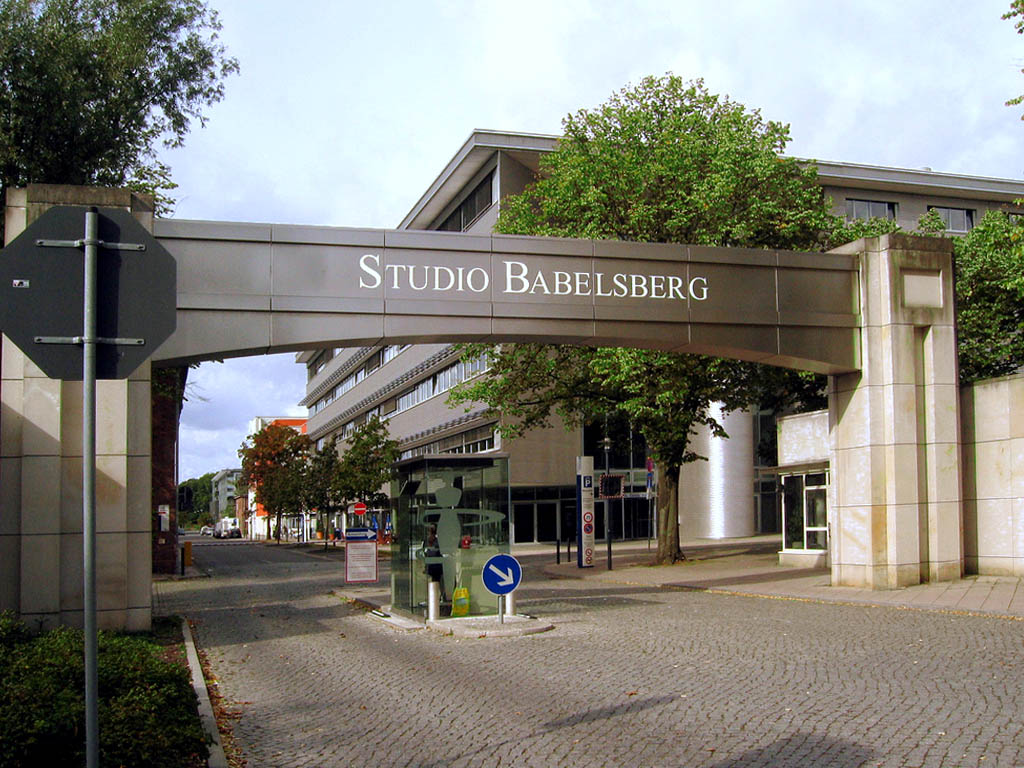
Entrance to the Babelsberg Studios

The European and German film industry is present, hosting more than 1000 film and television production companies, 270 movie theaters. Some 300 national and international co-productions are filmed in the region every year. The historic Babelsberg Studios and the production company UFA are located in nearby Potsdam. Rise FX has its headquarters in Berlin.

The city is home to the European Film Academy and the German Film Academy, and hosts the annual Berlin Film Festival. Founded in 1951, the festival has been celebrated annually in February since 1978. With over 430,000 admissions it is the largest publicly attended film festival in the world.

== See also ==
- Mass media in Germany
