= Anke Schmeink =

German computer scientist

Anke Schmeink (née Feiten) (born 1978) is a German mathematician and computer scientist, university professor leading the Chair of Information Theory and Data Analytics (INDA) in the Faculty of Electrical Engineering and Information Technology of RWTH Aachen University. Her research topics include wireless networking, edge computing, and machine learning for data analytics.

== Education and career ==
Schmeink earned a diploma in mathematics, with a minor in medicine, from RWTH Aachen in 2002. She continued studying there for a Ph.D. in electrical engineering and information technology in 2006. Her doctoral dissertation, Capacity analysis and resource allocation in wireless communication systems, was supervised by Rudolf Mathar. After working as a research scientist for Philips Research, she returned to RWTH Aachen in October 2012 as a professor at the Centre for Ultra High-Speed Mobile Information and Communications. She is currently Chair of Information Theory and Data Analytics there.

== Publications ==
Schmeink has over 300 publications to her name to date. She publishes under the names Anke Schmeink and A. Schmeink.

== Recognition ==
In 2009, Schmeink was the inaugural recipient of the Helene Lange Prize, a German bi-annual award for young women researchers in digital sciences and engineering, awarded by the EWE Stiftung and named for Helene Lange (1848-1930) a German politician, educator and women's rights activist. In the same year Schmeink joined the young academy of the North Rhine-Westphalian Academy of Sciences, Humanities and the Arts. She is a Senior Member of the Institute of Electrical and Electronics Engineers (IEEE).
