= Hellmuth Greinert =

German lawyer

Hellmuth Greinert (* 29 July 1906 in Plauen; † 30 November 1967 in Bonn) was a German lawyer, chairman of the supervisory board and politician (SPD).

== Life ==
Hellmuth Greinert was the son of a master craftsman. After attending elementary school and the Realgymnasium in Düsseldorf, he studied law in Berlin, Bonn and Cologne as a working student from 1926 to 1930. In 1930 he passed his legal clerkship and in 1933 his second state examination. This was followed in the same year by his work as a legal assistant in the Prussian Ministry of Justice.

In 1934 he joined the Rhineland Provincial Administration, of which he was District Administrator from 1942. In 1945 he took over the finance department of the provincial government of the North Rhine Province. After the foundation of the state of North Rhine-Westphalia in August 1946, he joined the Ministry of Finance. There he was appointed Ministerial Councillor in 1947 and Ministerial Director in 1949.

Greinert was appointed Chief City Director of the City of Essen, as Hugo Rosendahl's successor, on 1 September 1950. Which he was also a member of the German Association of Cities, the Rhineland Regional Association, the committee of the Ruhr Coal District Settlement Association and other public service organisations, associations and supervisory boards. Greinert was Chairman of the Supervisory Board of Rheinisch-Westfälische Elektrizitätswerks AG and joined its Board of Management on 1 September 1957, where he remained until his death. From 1960 he was also vice president of the Essen Chamber of Industry and Commerce. Greinert rendered outstanding services to the expansion of the municipal hospitals, from which the University Hospital Essen emerged.

He was buried in Essen at Bredeney cemetery.

== Honours ==
Greinert was made an honorary citizen of the RWTH Aachen and the Rheinische Friedrich-Wilhelms-Universität Bonn, and in 1955 was awarded an honorary doctorate from the Medical Academy in Düsseldorf.

== Literature ==
- Erwin Dickhoff: Essener Köpfe. publisher: Stadt Essen–Historischer Verein für Stadt und Stift Essen. Klartext-Verlag, Essen 2015, ISBN 978-3-8375-1231-1, p. 123.
- Fritz Pudor: Hellmuth Greinert; in: Lebensbilder aus dem Rheinisch-Westfälischen Industriegebiet Jahrgang 1962–1967. Nomos, Baden-Baden 1977, ISBN 978-3-7890-0261-8, p. 55–59.
