= Catherine Disselhorst-Klug =

Catherine Disselhorst-Klug is a German biomechanist and Professor at the Rheinisch-Westfälische Technische Hochschule (RWTH) Aachen, Germany at the Institute of Applied Medical Engineering, Department of Rehabilitation and Prevention Engineering.

Her research centers around movement biomechanics including neuromuscular coordination with a focus on the development of novel devices which can be integrated in diagnosis, prevention and rehabilitation of musculoskeletal dysfunction.

== Academic career ==
Disselhorst-Klug graduated with a degree in Physics in 1990 from the RWTH Aachen, Germany where she subsequently received her Ph.D. in Natural Science from the Faculty of Electrical Engineering in 1996. In 2006 she obtained the postdoctoral lecture qualification in Medical Engineering from the Medical Faculty of the RWTH Aachen University. From 1990 to 2001 she worked as a research associate at the Helmholtz-Institute for Biomedical Engineering. In 2009 she has become a Full Professor and Head of the Department of Rehabilitation and Prevention Engineering, Institute of Applied Medical Engineering, RWTH Aachen University, Germany.

Disselhorst-Klug served as a president of the International Society of Electrophysiology & Kinesiology (ISEK) from 2004-2006 and served as a member of the council from 1998-2008. She also served on the Executive Council of the International Society of Biomechanics from 2015-2019.

== Awards ==
- In 2024, Disselhorst-Klug was awarded with the John V. Basmajian Lectureship by the International Society of Electrophysiology and Kinesiology.
- In 2021, Disselhorst-Klug became a fellow of the International Society of Biomechanics (ISB).
- In 2008, Disselhorst-Klug became a fellow of the International Society of Electrophysiology and Kinesiology.
