= HiperMAN =

Wireless network standard

HiperMAN (High Performance Radio Metropolitan Area Network) is a standard created by the European Telecommunications Standards Institute (ETSI) Broadband Radio Access Networks (BRAN) group to provide a wireless network communication in the 2–11 GHz bands across Europe and other countries which follow the ETSI standard. HiperMAN is a European alternative to WiMAX (or the IEEE 802.16 standard) and the Korean technology WiBro.

HiperMAN is aiming principally for providing broadband Wireless Internet access, while covering a large geographic area. The standardization focuses on broadband solutions optimized for access in frequency bands below 11 GHz (mainly in the 3.5 GHz band). HiperMAN is optimised for packet switched networks, and supports fixed and nomadic applications, primarily in the residential and small business user environments.

HiperMAN will be an interoperable broadband fixed wireless access system operating at radio frequencies between 2 GHz and 11 GHz. The HiperMAN standard is designed for Fixed Wireless Access provisioning to SMEs and residences using the basic MAC (DLC and CLs) of the IEEE 802.16-2001 standard. It has been developed in very close cooperation with IEEE 802.16, such that the HiperMAN standard and a subset of the IEEE 802.16a-2003 standard will interoperate seamlessly. HiperMAN is capable of supporting ATM, though the main focus is on IP traffic. It offers various service categories, full quality of service, fast connection control management, strong security, fast adaptation of coding, modulation and transmit power to propagation conditions and is capable of non-line-of-sight operation. HiperMAN enables both PTMP and Mesh network configurations. HiperMAN also supports both FDD and TDD frequency allocations and H-FDD terminals. All this is achieved with a minimum number of options to simplify implementation and interoperability.

== See also ==
- HiperLAN
