= RWTH Aachen Faculty of Mathematics and Natural Sciences =

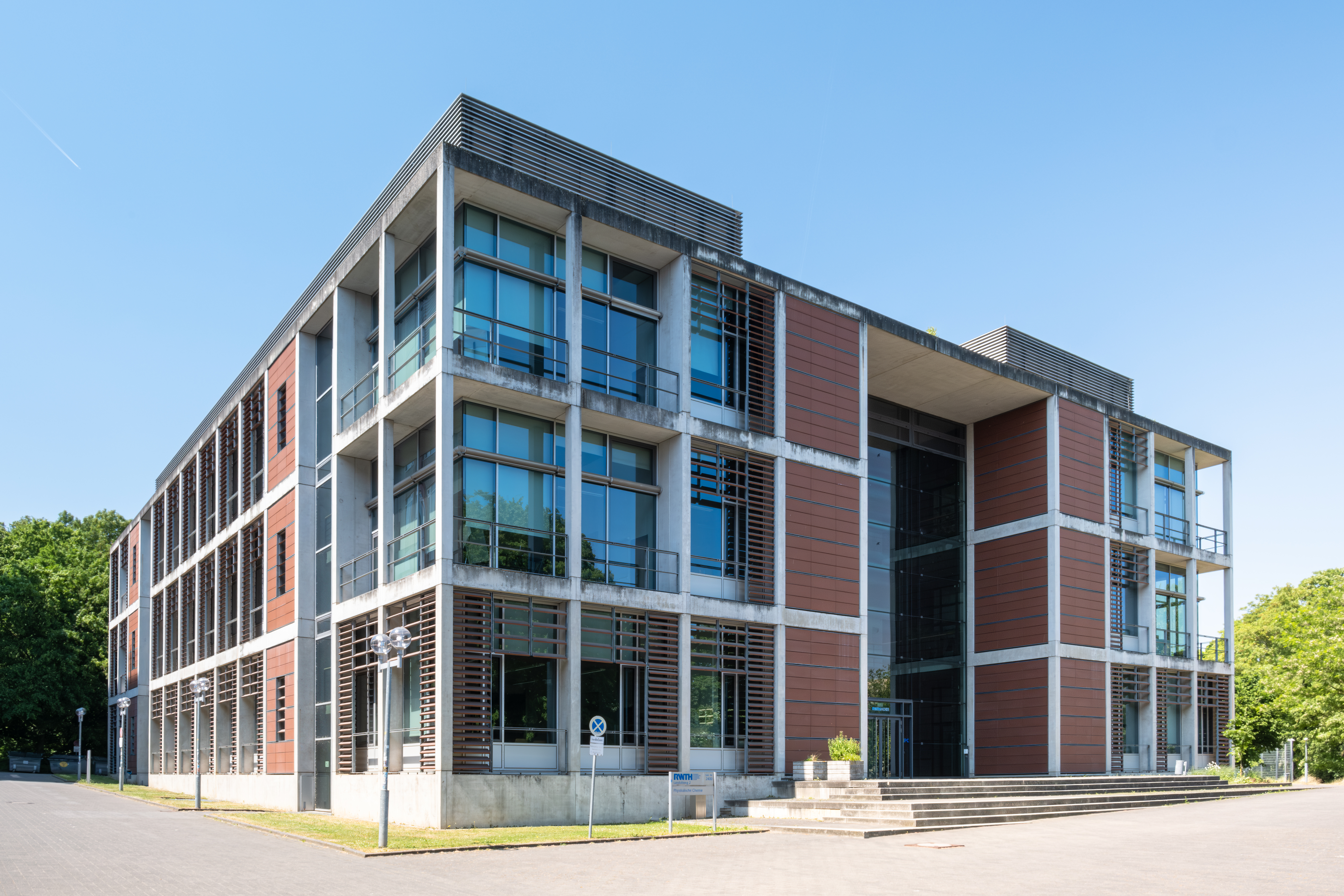
Institute for physical chemistry

The Faculty of Mathematics and Natural sciences is one of nine faculties at the RWTH Aachen University. It comprises four sections for mathematics, physics, chemistry and biology. The faculty was founded in 1880 and produced several notable individuals like Arnold Sommerfeld and Nobel Prize laureates Philipp Lenard, Wilhelm Wien, Johannes Stark or Karl Ziegler. Peter Debye studied physics at the RWTH Aachen and won the Nobel Prize in 1936. Furthermore, Helmut Zahn and his team of the Institute for textile chemistry were the first who synthesised Insulin.

The faculty cooperates with Forschungszentrum Jülich and the 4 Fraunhofer Institutes in Aachen. Several projects are assisted by the Deutsche Forschungsgemeinschaft and the European Union. In the academic year 2019/20, approximately 9,700 students are enrolled in the faculty, which makes it the second largest faculty at the RWTH.
