= RWTH Aachen Faculty of Mechanical Engineering =

The Faculty of Mechanical Engineering is one of the nine faculties at the RWTH Aachen University and is widely recognized as one of the foremosts of such a faculty in Europe and the world. It was established in 1880 and has produced several notable individuals including Wendelin Wiedeking, Hugo Junkers, and Jesco von Puttkamer. Theodore von Kármán, a pioneer of modern Aerodynamics, accepted a position as director of the Aeronautical Institute in 1912. Several projects are assisted by the Deutsche Forschungsgemeinschaft and the European Union. Approximately 7,100 students are enrolled in the faculty. The faculty received a high amount of funds granted by third-party donors in the last years.

The faculty is closely affiliated with the German Universities Excellence Initiative as all the three lines of funding, including the institutional strategy, one graduate school, and three 'clusters of excellence', involve chairs and institutes from the faculty. No other similar faculties in Germany obtain such a distinction.

The faculty is divided in about 50 chairs and institutes. There are cooperations with the Jülich Research Centre and the four Fraunhofer Institutes in Aachen. The research activities of the faculty are organized according to the following several fields:

- Chemical and Process Engineering
- Control Engineering
- Aeronautics and Aerospace Engineering
- Design Engineering and Development
- Plastics and Textile Technology
- Power Engineering
- Medical Engineering
- Computational Engineering Science
- Production Technology, Industrial Engineering, and Ergonomics

== Rankings and degrees awarded ==
The university was ranked 17th by QS World University Rankings and 23rd by US News in 2013 for mechanical engineering.

The following Degrees are awarded in mechanical engineering:

- Bachelor of Science (BSc RWTH)
- Master of Science (MSc RWTH)
- Diplom (Dipl.-Ing.) (discontinued due to Bologna Process)
- Doctor (Dr.-Ing.)
