= RWTH Aachen Faculty of Electrical Engineering and Information Technology =

The Faculty of Electrical Engineering and Information Technology is one of nine faculties at the RWTH Aachen University. It was separated from the Faculty of Mechanical Engineering in 1961. RWTH has produced several notable individuals. Nobel Prize laureate Peter Debye received a degree in electrical engineering. Furthermore Bodo von Borries, Professor of Electrical Engineering was a co-inventor of electron microscope. Traditionally, the faculty is recognized for its strength in research. Several projects are assisted by the Deutsche Forschungsgemeinschaft and the European Union. Concerning funding by the German Research Foundation (Deutsche Forschungsgemeinschaft), from 2011 to 2013 in its field of activity the faculty obtained the highest funding nationwide.

In 2014, more than 4,200 students were enrolled in the faculty.

== Structure ==
The faculty cooperates with the Jülich Research Centre. It is organized in more than 30 institutes and chairs. In the past, it included endowed chairs from Ericsson and Philips. The research activities of the faculty are organized according to the following four fields:

- Power Engineering and Environment
- Information and Communications Technology
- Micro- and Nanoelectronics
- Biomedical Engineering

== Degrees awarded ==
The following Degrees are awarded in electrical engineering and industrial engineering:

- Bachelor of Science
- Master of Science
- Doctor (Dr.-Ing.)
- Master of Education

=== Historical degrees ===
Study programs had to be changed due to the Bologna Process which started in 1999. Therefore, these degrees are no longer being awarded:

- Diplom
- Magister
