= Perhimpunan Pelajar Indonesia di Jerman =

Perhimpunan Pelajar Indonesia di Jerman (PPI Jerman)
- Vereinigung Indonesischer Studenten in Deutschland e.V.
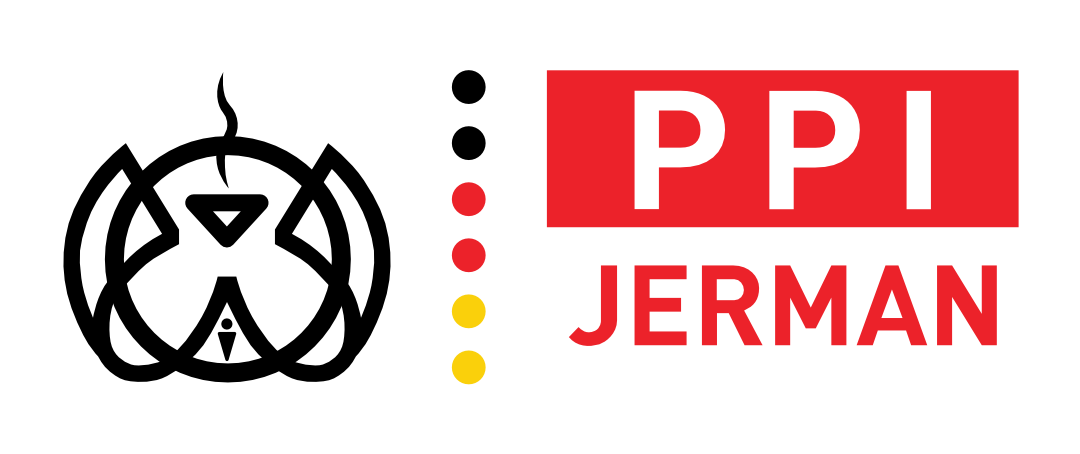
- Formation: May 4th, 1956
- Founder: Chairul Saleh
- Founded at: Bad Godesberg, North Rhein-Westphalia
- Purpose: Student organisation
- Headquarters: Munich, Bavaria
- Members: 12.000+
- Official language: German, Bahasa Indonesia
- Acting President: Maria Patricia Viannisa
- Affiliations: 27 regional branches
- Volunteers: 138 (2025/2026)
- Website: ppijerman.org

The Indonesian Students Association in Germany (PPI Jerman), officially known in German as Vereinigung Indonesischer Studenten in Deutschland e.V., is a non-partisan, scientific, social, and independent organization that serves as a cultural integration center for Indonesian students and the Indonesian community in Germany.

== History ==
=== Establishment and Early Years (1956-1965) ===
PPI Jerman was officially founded on May 4, 1956, in Bad Godesberg, a district in Bonn, which at the time served as the capital of West Germany. The initiative came from a group of Indonesian students and nationalists, many of whom were politically active and ideologically engaged with Indonesia's early post-independence discourse. Among the notable initiators was Chairul Saleh, a close associate of President Sukarno and a prominent political figure who would later become Minister of Industry in Indonesia.

The founding of PPI Jerman was deeply intertwined with Indonesia’s diplomatic and cultural strategy in the post-independence era. The Indonesian government, keen to promote education and international engagement, supported the formation of student associations abroad as a way to maintain strong ties with the diaspora and build a network of future leaders. PPI Jerman served as a unifying platform for Indonesian students studying across different universities in Germany, and also acted as a cultural ambassador, promoting Indonesian heritage through academic and social events.

During its early years, PPI Jerman emphasized solidarity, cultural identity, and intellectual development. It often hosted discussions on Indonesia’s political trajectory, organized cultural performances, and published newsletters to circulate among the Indonesian student body. These efforts were not only aimed at enhancing the student experience but also served to position Indonesian students as informal envoys in Germany, representing the aspirations of a young and dynamic post-colonial nation.

At the fifth Congress on March 7, 1962, under the leadership of Midian Sirait, PPI Jerman (at that time called PPI West Germany) created Vereinssatzung der Vereinigung Indonesischer Studenten (V.I.S) e.V. which was approved by the Local District Court in Bonn. With this statute, PPI Jerman officially became a legal student organization registered with the German government and recognized Midian Sirait as the first General Chairman of PPI Jerman.

=== New Order and Resistance to the Regime (1965-1998) ===
In 1966, the Indonesian Ministry of Education formally recognized PPI as the sole Indonesian student organization in Europe. This recognition, while granting legitimacy, also bound the organization more closely to state directives, including anti-communist screening measures for overseas students. Indonesian students were required to pledge loyalty to the government and report on political affiliations, particularly those linked to the banned party.

By the early 1970s, discontent grew among members of PPI Jerman. At the 1972 National Assembly in Mainz, the organization declared its independence from Indonesian government interference and redefined itself as a non-partisan, scholarly body focused on free public discourse. This declaration marked the beginning of PPI’s resistance against state-imposed ideological control.

Throughout the 1980s, PPI Berlin-West became a stronghold of opposition. Members openly criticized the New Order’s authoritarian policies, particularly programs like the Pedoman Penghayatan dan Pengamalan Pancasila (P4), a tool of ideological indoctrination. Prominent student activists, such as Pipit Rochijat, faced state retaliation—including shortened passport validity and administrative sanctions by Indonesian diplomatic missions.

In 1995, large-scale demonstrations were held during President Suharto’s visit to Germany, notably in Dresden, with participation from international activists protesting Indonesia’s human rights abuses, including the annexation of East Timor. These events signaled growing international awareness and diaspora-led resistance to the regime. The fall of Suharto in 1998 marked a turning point. Many exiled or politically marginalized students, including former PPI activists, welcomed the democratic transition and returned to Indonesia after decades abroad.

=== Reform Period: Dormancy and Re-establishment (1998–2006) ===
Following Indonesia’s Reformasi in 1998, PPI Jerman experienced a period of dormancy. The organization, initially founded in opposition to the authoritarianism of the New Order regime, was perceived by many students as no longer relevant in the democratic transition era. Although some local branches remained active, the national structure weakened due to a lack of coordination and leadership. However in 2000, attempts to revitalize the central leadership were hindered by difficulties in regeneration and insufficient participation from regional chapters, causing nationwide-level activities to stall.

A renewed effort to reactivate PPI Jerman emerged at the Indonesian Reform Forum in Berlin in November 2005. This momentum culminated in a strategic gathering during the Youth Pledge and Heroes Day commemoration at the Indonesian Embassy in Berlin on November 2006. Encouraged by the embassy, Indonesian students agreed to hold a follow-up meeting in Göttingen, which resulted in the signing of the Manifesto Göttingen on 11 November 2006—a declaration to restore the nationwide organization.

The Manifesto Göttingen led to an Extraordinary General Assembly (Sidang Pertanggungjawaban Anggota-Luar Biasa) in Berlin on 9–10 December 2006. Delegates amended the organization's statutes to enhance inclusivity and flexibility and drafted a new work program. Besides a newly elected chair and vicechair, a supervisory body called the Audit and Activity Monitoring Board (Badan Pengawas Kegiatan dan Keuangan) was also established to ensure organizational accountability. This marked the formal revival of PPI Jerman, both structurally and legally. The organization resumed its role as a national umbrella for Indonesian students in Germany, facilitating academic and cultural exchange.

=== Revival and Growth (2006-today) ===
Since the revitalization in 2006, PPI Jerman has experienced steady growth, but the period from 2016 to the present marks a phase of significant expansion and modernization. With over 31 active branches and a membership exceeding 11,000 Indonesian students across Germany, the organization has transformed into a well-structured national body. PPI Jerman has strengthened its internal framework by establishing specialized departments such as Personal and Career Development, Research and Strategic Studies, and Youth and Education, allowing for more targeted support and opportunities for students. It has also increased the scale and frequency of national events, leadership training, academic webinars, and cultural programs—highlighted by the successful biennale-conference called ICONIC (International Conference of Indonesian Students in Germany). ICONIC serves as a platform for Indonesian students worldwide to submit and present research papers. The inaugural 2016 ICONIC conference in Hamburg was a major success, featuring former Indonesian President B. J. Habibie as the keynote speaker.

These milestones underscore PPI Jerman's role not only as a student association but also as a hub for cultural diplomacy, leadership development, and academic excellence. The organization's growth trajectory reflects its ongoing commitment to adapting to student needs while strengthening the Indonesian academic diaspora in Germany.

== Branches in Germany ==
Perhimpunan Pelajar Indonesia di Jerman (Germany)

The following are the local branches of PPI Jerman in Germany:

• PPI Aachen	• PPI Anhalt
• PPI Berlin-Brandenburg (Berbrand)	• PPI Bochum-Dortmund (Bodor)
• PPI Bonn	• PPI Braunschweig
• PPI Bremen	• PPI Chemnitz
• PPI Clausthal	• PPI Dresden
• PPI Duisburg-Essen (Dues)	• PPI Frada
• PPI Franken	• PPI Freiburg
• PPI Giessen	• PPI Greifswald
• PPI Göttingen	• PPI Halle
• PPI Hamburg	• PPI Hannover
• PPI Kaiserslautern	• PPI Karlsruhe
• PPI Kassel	• PPI Kiel
• PPI Leipzig	• PPI Mannheim
• PPI Munich	• PPI Münster
• PPI Osnabrück	• PPI Rostock
• PPI Saarland	• PPI Stuttgart
• PPI Thüringen	
