= Bernd Lottermoser =

German geologist (born 1961)

Bernd Georg Lottermoser is university professor with expertise in the sustainable extraction of mineral resources.

== Life and education ==
Bernd Lottermoser earned a Diploma of Science in geology from the University of Newcastle and a PhD in ore deposit geology from the same university. His doctoral thesis was titled Rare earth elements and ore formation processes.

== Published work ==
Bernd Lottermoser is author of over 300 publications, conference contributions and scientific reports. In addition, he has published 4 books:

- Mine Wastes: Characterisation, Treatment and Environmental Impacts. Springer Verlag
- Environmental Indicators in Metal Mining. Springer Verlag
- Rocks, Landscapes and Resources of the Wet Tropics. Geological Society of Australia
- Ethics in Mining; Fundamentals, Practices, Challenges. UVG-Verlag, Berlin
