= RWTH Aachen Faculty of Medicine =

The Faculty of Medicine is one of ten faculties at the RWTH Aachen University. It was founded in 1966. The Klinikum Aachen contains many specialised clinics, theoretical and clinical institutes and other research facilities, lecture halls, schools for jobs in the medical field, and all facilities necessary for a hospital like a laundry and central sterilisation. Approximately 2,700 students are enrolled in the faculty.

== Degrees awarded ==
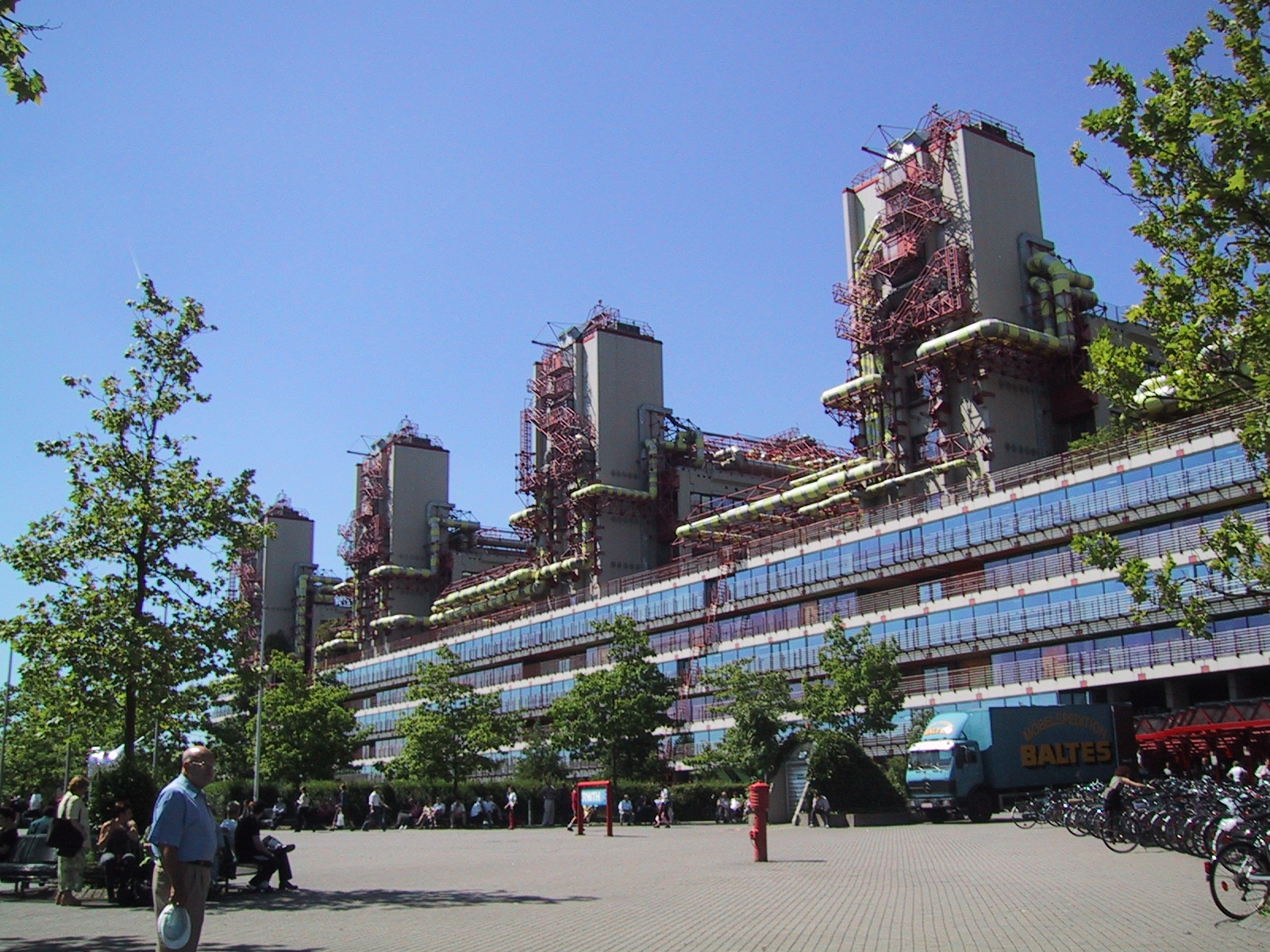
Klinikum Aachen (University hospital)

The main degree is the Aachen Model Medical Degree Program, which was introduced for all first-year students in the winter semester of 2003/2004 enables organ-centered teaching and learning—instead of the previous subject-centered approach. In addition, the faculty offers other degree programs:

- State Examination (in Medicine)
- Dentistry
- Speech-Language Pathology (B.Sc)
- Speech-Language Pathology (M.Sc.)
- Biomedical Engineering (M.Sc.)
