= HiperLAN =

Wireless LAN standard

HiperLAN (High Performance Radio LAN) is a wireless LAN standard. It is a European alternative for the IEEE 802.11 standards. It is defined by the European Telecommunications Standards Institute (ETSI). In ETSI the standards are defined by the BRAN project (Broadband Radio Access Networks). The HiperLAN standard family has four different versions.

== HiperLAN/1 ==
Planning for the first version of the standard, called HiperLAN/1, started 1992, when planning of 802.11 was already going on. The goal of the HiperLAN was the high data rate, higher than 802.11. The standard was approved in 1997. The functional specification is EN300652, the rest is in ETS300836.

The standard covers the physical layer and the media access control part of the data link layer like 802.11. There is a new sublayer called Channel Access and Control sublayer (CAC). This sublayer deals with the access requests to the channels. The accomplishing of the request is dependent on the usage of the channel and the priority of the request.

CAC layer provides hierarchical independence with Elimination-Yield Non-Preemptive Multiple Access mechanism (EY-NPMA). EY-NPMA codes priority choices and other functions into one variable length radio pulse preceding the packet data. EY-NPMA enables the network to function with few collisions even though there would be a large number of users. Multimedia applications work in HiperLAN because of EY-NPMA priority mechanism. MAC layer defines protocols for routing, security and power saving and provides naturally data transfer to the upper layers.

On the physical layer FSK and GMSK modulations are used in HiperLAN/1.

HiperLAN features:

- range 100 m
- slow mobility (1.4 m/s)
- supports asynchronous and synchronous traffic
- Bit rate - 23.59 Mbit/s
- Description- Wireless Ethernet
- Frequency range- 5 GHz

HiperLAN does not conflict with microwave and other kitchen appliances, which are on 2.4 GHz. An innovative feature of HIPERLAN 1, which other wireless networks do not offer, is its ability to forward data packets using several relays. Relays can extend the communication on the MAC layer beyond the radio range. For power conservation, a node may set up a specific wake up pattern. This pattern determines at what time the node is ready to receive, so that at other times, the node can turn off its receiver and save energy. These nodes are called p-savers and need so called p-supporters that contain information about wake up patterns of all the p-savers they are responsible for. A p-supporter only forwards data to a p-saver at the moment p-saver is awake. This action also requires buffering mechanisms for packets on p-supporting forwarders.

== HiperLAN/2 ==
HiperLAN/2 functional specification was accomplished February 2000. Version 2 is designed as a fast wireless connection for many kinds of networks. Those are UMTS back bone network, ATM and IP networks. Also it works as a network at home like HiperLAN/1. HiperLAN/2 uses the 5 GHz band and up to 54 Mbit/s data rate.

The physical layer of HiperLAN/2 is very similar to IEEE 802.11a wireless local area networks. However, the media access control (the multiple access protocol) is Dynamic TDMA in HiperLAN/2, while CSMA/CA is used in 802.11a/n.

Basic services in HiperLAN/2 are data, sound, and video transmission. The emphasis is in the quality of these services (QoS).

The standard covers Physical, Data Link Control and Convergence layers. Convergence layer takes care of service dependent functionality between DLC and Network layer (OSI 3). Convergence sublayers can be used also on the physical layer to connect IP, ATM or UMTS networks. This feature makes HiperLAN/2 suitable for the wireless connection of various networks.

On the physical layer BPSK, QPSK, 16QAM or 64QAM modulations are used through OFDM.

HiperLAN/2 offers security measures. The data are secured with DES or Triple DES algorithms. The wireless access point and the wireless terminal can authenticate each other.

Most important worldwide manufacturers of HiperLAN/2 are Alvarion (Israel), Freescale (USA), Panasonic (Japan).

== Failure in the Market ==
Due to competition from IEEE 802.11, which was simpler to implement and made it faster to the market, HiperLAN never received much commercial implementation. Much of the work on HiperLAN/2 has survived in the PHY specification for IEEE 802.11a, which is nearly identical to the PHY of HiperLAN/2. HIPERACCESS was intended as a last-mile technology. HIPERLINK was intended as a short-range point-to-point technology at 155 Mbit/s.

== See also ==
- HiperMAN
