= P3 group =

International management and engineering consulting firm

- Native name: P3
- Type: GmbH
- Industry: Automotive, energy, public sector
- Founded: 1996
- Defunct: 2019
- Headquarters: Stuttgart, Germany
- Key people: Christoph Theis (CEO), Robert Rendl (CEO)
- Services: Professional services, management consulting, software development
- Net income: EUR 115 million (2021)
- Number of employees: 1450 (December 2021)
- Website: www.p3-group.com

The P3 Group GmbH is a management consultancy with headquarters in Stuttgart, Germany. Based on the company's data, more than 1450 employees work for the company, generating a revenue of about 115 million euros. The P3 Group draws its clients primarily from the automotive, energy and public sector.

In 1996 the company was founded as P3 - Ingenieurgesellschaft für Management und Organisation. In 2019, the company split into Umlaut AG, still headquartered in Aachen, and P3 Global GmbH, situated in Stuttgart. In 2020, P3 Global became P3 Group again.

In 2022, P3 Group was named as one of the "World's Best Management Consulting Firms" by Forbes.

== Formation ==
The company was founded in 1996 by Thomas Prefi, Christoph Theis and Thomas Weingarten as a spin-off company of the Fraunhofer Institute for Production Technology (IPT) in Aachen, Germany. The founding resulted from the successful development of a quality management concept for the former Daimler-Benz.

== Subsidiaries and international development ==
In order to specialize in specific industries, the company established subsidiaries, which together form the P3 group:

- P3 Automotive GmbH since 2006 with head office in Stuttgart, Germany. Their focus areas are: Technology and management consulting, project management, electric mobility, operations and supply chain
- P3 Digital Services GmbH since 2016 with head office Düsseldorf. Their focus areas are: Application and software development, android automotive, IT consulting and IT architecture, rollout and operation
- P3 Security Consulting GmbH since 2018 with head office in Stuttgart. Their focus areas are: Security framework and consulting in the fields of ISO 27001, DSGVO, UN/ECE and IoT Security

Furthermore, the whole enterprise includes more international country subsidiaries:

- P3 Mexico (P-Tres Group, S.A.P.I. DE C.V.) with head office in Mexico City and Querétaro, since 2013
- P3 China (P3 Technical and Management Consulting (Shanghai) Co., Ltd - 德咨技术管理咨询（上海）有限公司) with head office in Shanghai and offices in Beijing and Shenzhen, since 2014
- P3 France (P3 France SARL) with head office in Paris and office in Toulouse, since 2019
- P3 United States (P3 USA Inc.) with head office in Greenville and offices in Detroit and Dallas, since 2019
- P3 Group (Thailand) Limited with head office in Bangkok, since 2020
- P3 Korea with head office in Seoul, since 2021
- P3 Colombia with head office in Cali
- P3 Greece with head office in Athens
- P3 Bulgaria with head office in Sofia
- P3 Denmark with head office in Copenhagen
- P3 Czech Republic with head office in Prague
- P3 Namibia with head office in Windhoek

P3 also maintains nearshore technology locations:

- P3 Romania with head office in Cluj-Napoca
- P3 digital services SRL, since 2016
- P3 Cyber Threat Defense SRL, since 2022, specialized in cybersecurity
- P3 Serbia (P3 RS d.o.o.) with head office in Belgrade and office in Subotica, since 2019

== Services and products ==
- Management consulting: Technology consulting, management consulting, fault management, digitalization
- Management support: Strategy and process management, project management, configuration management, cost management, complexity management
- Software development
- Android Automotive
- RPA
- Cybersecurity consulting
