= RWTH Aachen University =

Public university in Aachen, Germany

- RWTH Aachen
- Motto: Zukunft denken
- Motto in English: Thinking the Future
- Type: Public
- Established: 10 October 1870; 156 years ago
- Affiliations: Domestic: DFG; German Excellence Initiative; TU9; International: ALMA; CESAER; IDEA Leaguepm; SEFI; TIME; UNITECH; PEGASUS; EUA
- Budget: EUR 1.264 billion (2025)
- Rector: Ulrich Rüdiger
- Academic staff: 6,264
- Administrative staff: 2,979
- Students: 44,382 (2025/26)
- Location: Aachen, North Rhine-Westphalia, Germany; 50°46′40″N 6°04′41″E
- Campus: 618 acres (250 ha); Urban
- Website: rwth-aachen.de
- Location within Germany Location within North Rhine-Westphalia

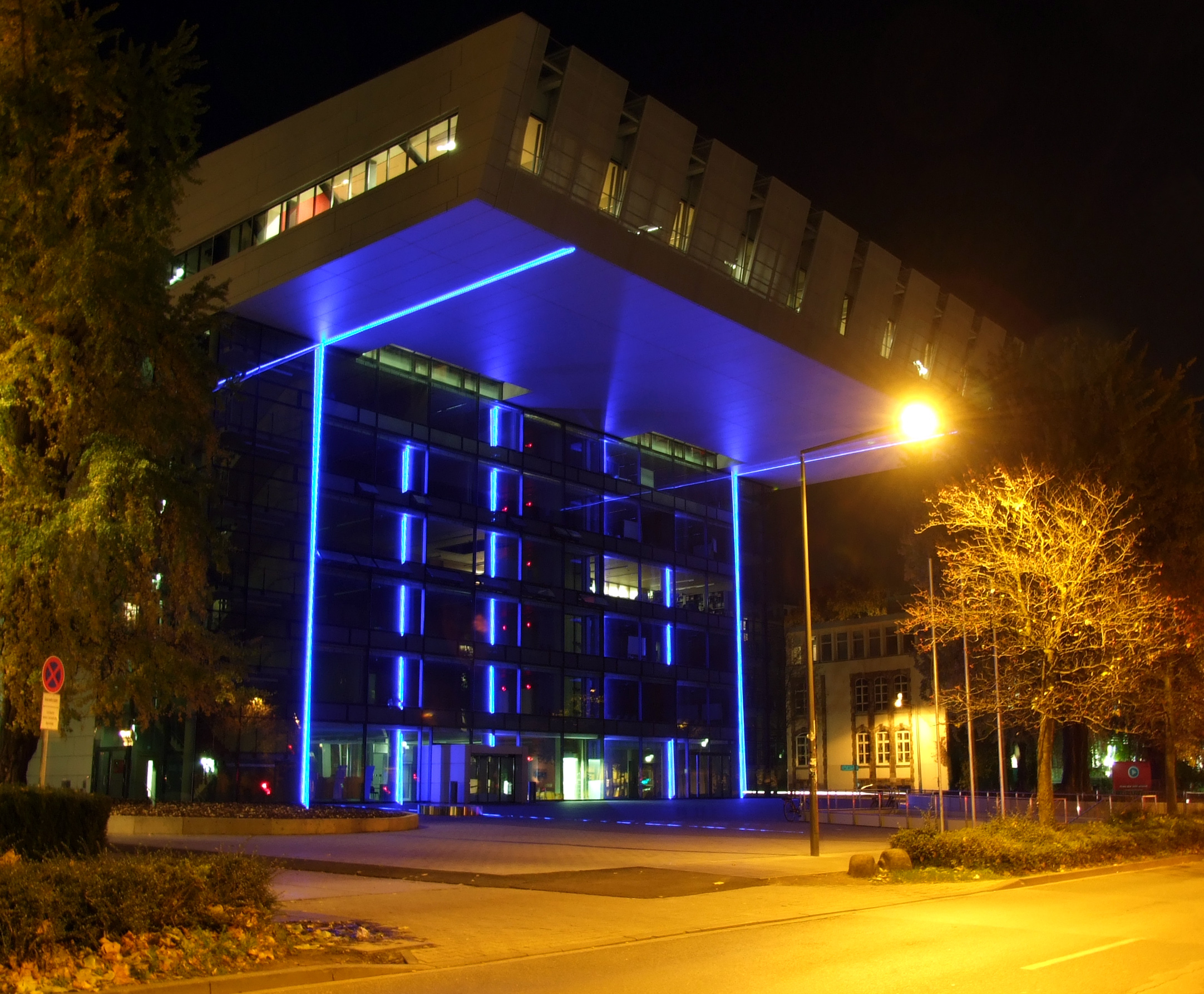
SuperC, landmark of RWTH Aachen and the central service building for students

RWTH Aachen University (German: RWTH Aachen or Rheinisch-Westfälische Technische Hochschule Aachen, lit. Rhenish-Westphalian Technical University Aachen) is a public research university located in Aachen, North Rhine-Westphalia, Germany. It is one of the oldest and leading technical universities in Germany (TU9) and, with about 45,000 students, is simultaneously the second-largest. It was founded in 1870 as Königliche Rheinisch-Westfälische Polytechnische Schule zu Aachen in Prussia. Renowned for its academic excellence, RWTH Aachen is funded under the national Excellence Strategy and is recognized as an elite research university. The university comprises ten faculties and some 290 institutes.

RWTH Aachen maintains numerous partner universities and is a founding member of the CESAER association of universities of science and technology in Europe, and IDEA League, a strategic alliance of five leading universities of technology in Europe, as well as its German counterpart TU9. It is also a member of DFG, Top Industrial Managers for Europe, ACalNet, ALMA, CESAER, DFH, JARA, NRW-Zertifikat, ENHANCE, PEGASUS and UNITECH International.

Since 2007, RWTH Aachen has been continuously funded by the DFG and the German Council of Science and Humanities as one of eleven (previously nine) German Universities of Excellence.

== History ==
On 25 January 1858, prince Frederick William of Prussia (later German emperor), was given a donation of 5,000 talers from the Aachener und Münchener Feuer-Versicherungs-Gesellschaft, the precursor of the AachenMünchener insurance company, for charity. In March, the prince chose to use the donation to found the first Prussian institute of technology somewhere in the Rhine province. The seat of the institution remained undecided over years; while the prince initially favored Koblenz, the cities of Aachen, Bonn, Cologne and Düsseldorf also applied, with Aachen and Cologne being the main competitors. Aachen finally won with a financing concept backed by the insurance company and by local banks. Groundbreaking for the new Polytechnikum took place on 15 May 1865 and lectures started during the Franco-Prussian War on 10 October 1870 with 223 students and 32 teachers. The new institution had as its primary purpose the education of engineers, especially for the mining industry in the Ruhr area; there were schools of chemistry, electrical and mechanical engineering as well as an introductory general school that taught mathematics and natural sciences and some social sciences.

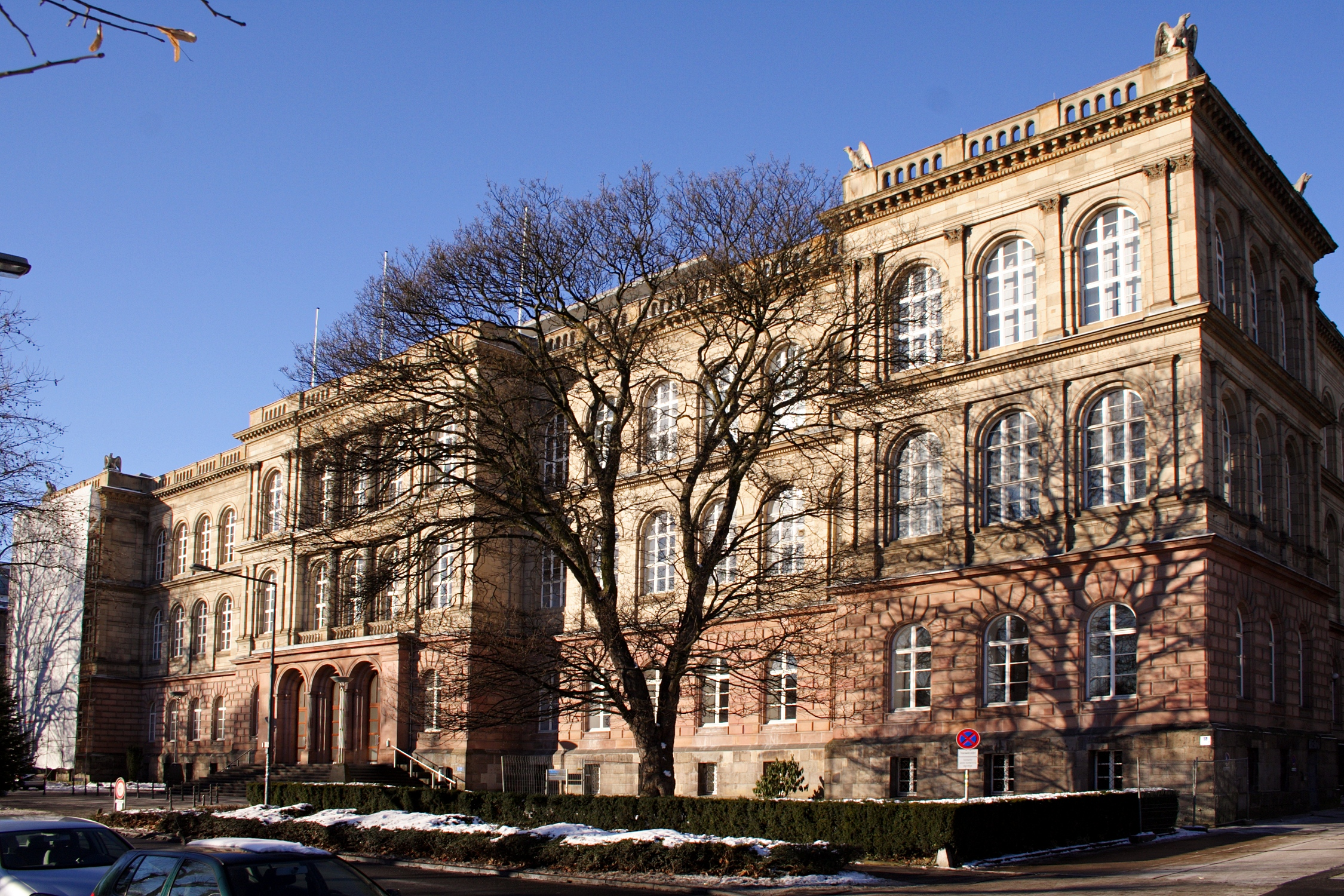
Main Building of the RWTH Aachen. It was built in 1870.

The unclear position of the new Prussian polytechnika (which officially were not universities) affected the first years. Polytechnics lacked prestige in society and the number of students decreased. This began to change in 1880 when the early RWTH, amongst others, was reorganized as a Royal Technical University, gained a seat in the Prussian House of Lords and finally won the right to bestow Dr.-Ing. (1899) degrees and Dipl.-Ing. titles (introduced in 1902). In the same year, over 800 male students enrolled. In 1909 the first women were admitted and the artist August von Brandis succeeded Alexander Frenz at the Faculty of Architecture as a "professor of figure and landscape painting", Brandis became dean in 1929.

World War I, however, proved a serious setback for the university. Many students voluntarily joined up and died in the war, and parts of the university were shortly occupied or confiscated.

While the (then no more royal) TH Aachen (Technische Hochschule Aachen) flourished in the 1920s with the introduction of more independent faculties, of several new institutes and of the general students' committee, the first signs of nationalist radicalization also became visible within the university. Nazi Germany's Gleichschaltung of the TH in 1933 met with relatively low resistance from both students and faculty. Beginning in September 1933, Jewish and (alleged) Communist professors (and from 1937 on also students) were systematically persecuted and excluded from the university. Vacant Chairs were increasingly given to NSDAP party-members or sympathizers. The freedom of research and teaching became severely limited, and institutes important for the regime's plans were systematically established, and existing chairs promoted. Briefly closed in 1939, the TH continued courses in 1940, although with a low number of students. On 21 October 1944, when Aachen capitulated, more than 70% of all buildings of the university were destroyed or heavily damaged.

After World War II ended in 1945 the university recovered and expanded quickly. In the 1950s, many professors who had been removed because of their alleged affiliation with the Nazi party were allowed to return and a multitude of new institutes were founded. By the late 1960s, the TH had 10,000 students, making it the foremost of all German technical universities. With the foundation of philosophical and medical faculties in 1965 and 1966, respectively, the university became more "universal". The newly founded faculties in particular began attracting new students, and the number of students almost doubled twice from 1970 (10,000) to 1980 (more than 25,000) and from 1980 to 1990 (more than 37,000). Now, the average number of students is around 42,000, with about one third of all students being women. By relative terms, the most popular study-programs are engineering (57%), natural science (23%), economics and humanities (13%) and medicine (7%).

=== Recent developments ===
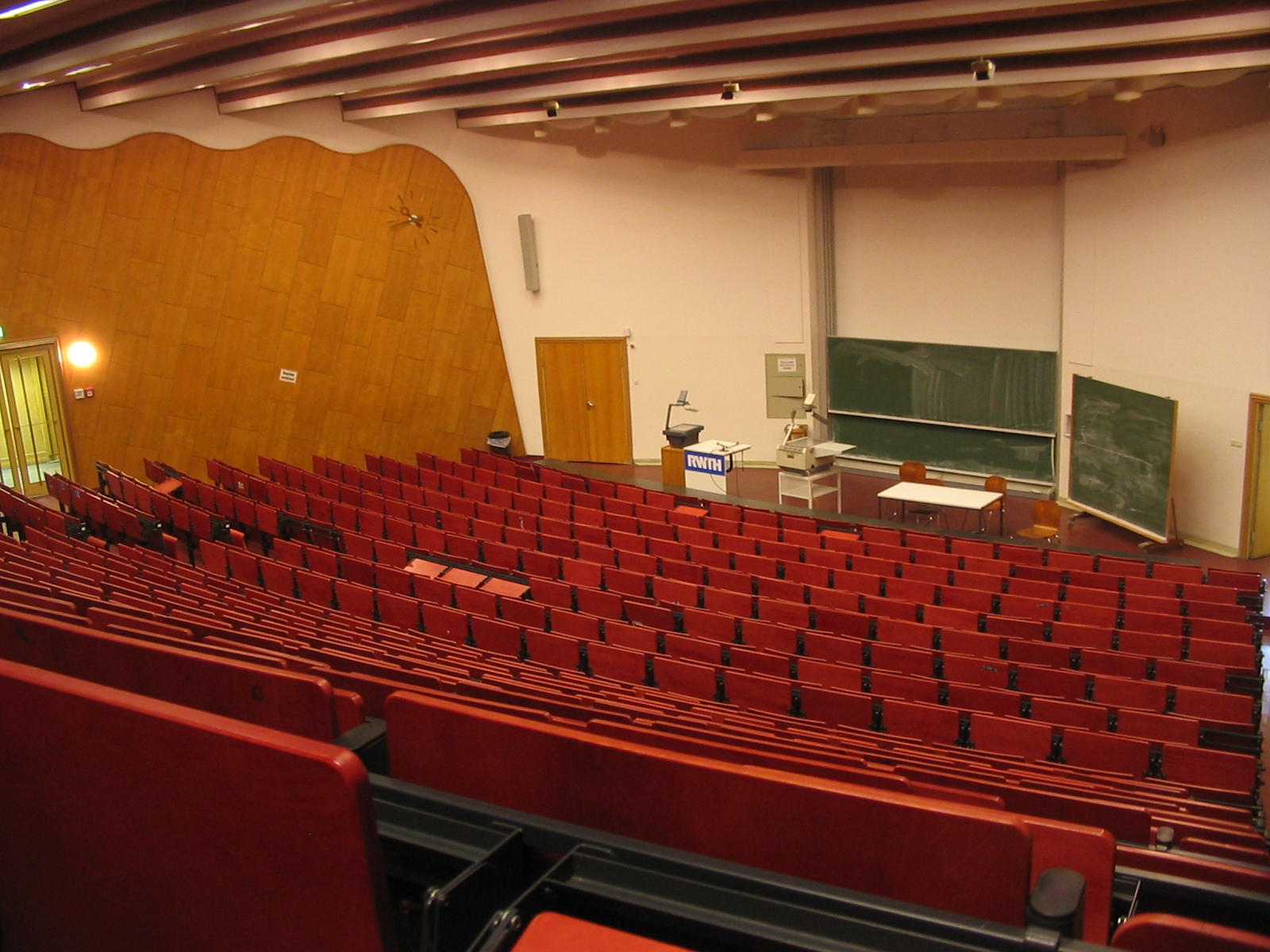
"Red lecture hall" at the central campus

In December 2006, RWTH Aachen and the Sultanate of Oman signed an agreement to establish a private German University of Technology in Muscat. Professors from Aachen aided in developing the curricula for the currently five study-programs and scientific staff took over some of the first courses.

In 2007, RWTH Aachen was chosen as one of nine German Universities of Excellence for its future concept RWTH 2020: Meeting Global Challenges, earning it the connotation of being a "University of Excellence". However, although the list of universities honored for their future concepts mostly consists of large and already respected institutions, the Federal Ministry of Education and Research claimed that the initiative aimed at promoting universities with a dedicated future concept so they could continue researching on an international level. Having won funds in all three lines of funding, the process brought RWTH Aachen University an additional total funding of €180 million from 2007 to 2011. The other two lines of funding were graduate schools, where the Aachen Institute for Advanced Study in Computational Engineering Science received funding and so-called "clusters of excellence", where RWTH Aachen managed to win funding for the three clusters: Ultra High-Speed Mobile Information and Communication (UMIC), Integrative Production Technology for High-wage Countries and Tailor-Made Fuels from Biomass (TMFB).

RWTH was selected to receive funding from the German federal and state governments for the third Universities of Excellence funding line starting 2019. RWTH's proposal was called "The Integrated Interdisciplinary University of Science and Technology – Knowledge. Impact. Networks." and has secured funding for a seven-year period.

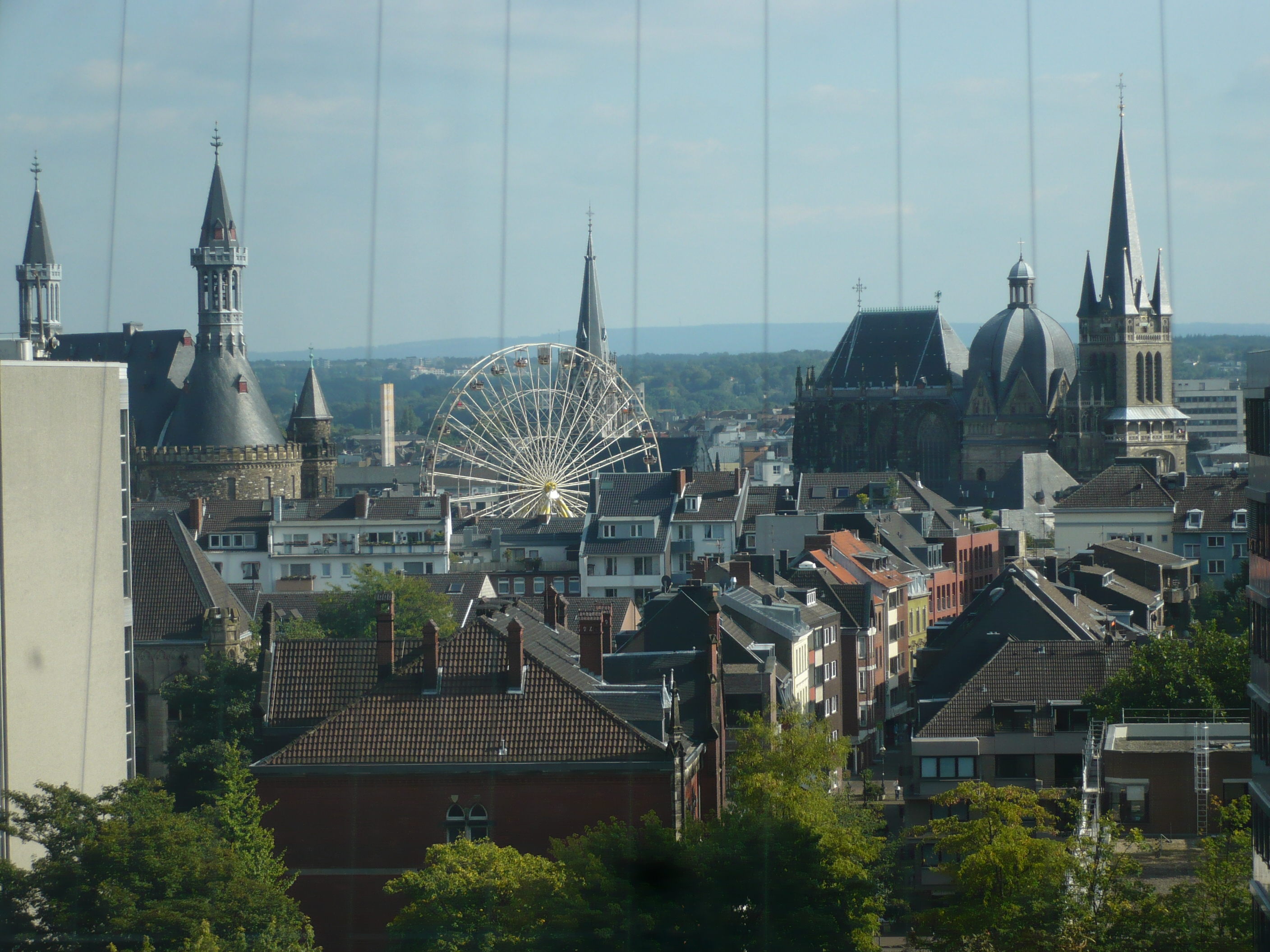
View towards the city of Aachen from SuperC, a central building for students next to the main building at the midtown campus

2019 Clusters of Excellence:

- The Fuel Science Center (FSC) Adaptive Conversion Systems for Renewable Energy and Carbon Sources
- Internet of Production
- ML4Q – Matter and Light for Quantum Computing

RWTH was already awarded funding in the first and second Universities of Excellence funding lines, in 2007 and 2012 respectively.

The RWTH itself has a University agreement with the Harbin Institute of Technology since 2019. In June 2024 a research by Correctiv journalists showed Chinese military involvement in several RWTH projects. From 100 RWTH professors in Mechanical- and Electrical engineering 19 had cooperated with researchers from NUDT and the Seven Sons of National Defence initiative and 45 had benefited from Chinese government funding. The money, in some cases channelled through companies privately held by RWTH professors, went, among other things, to projects with military applications, including radar technology for drones.

== Campus ==
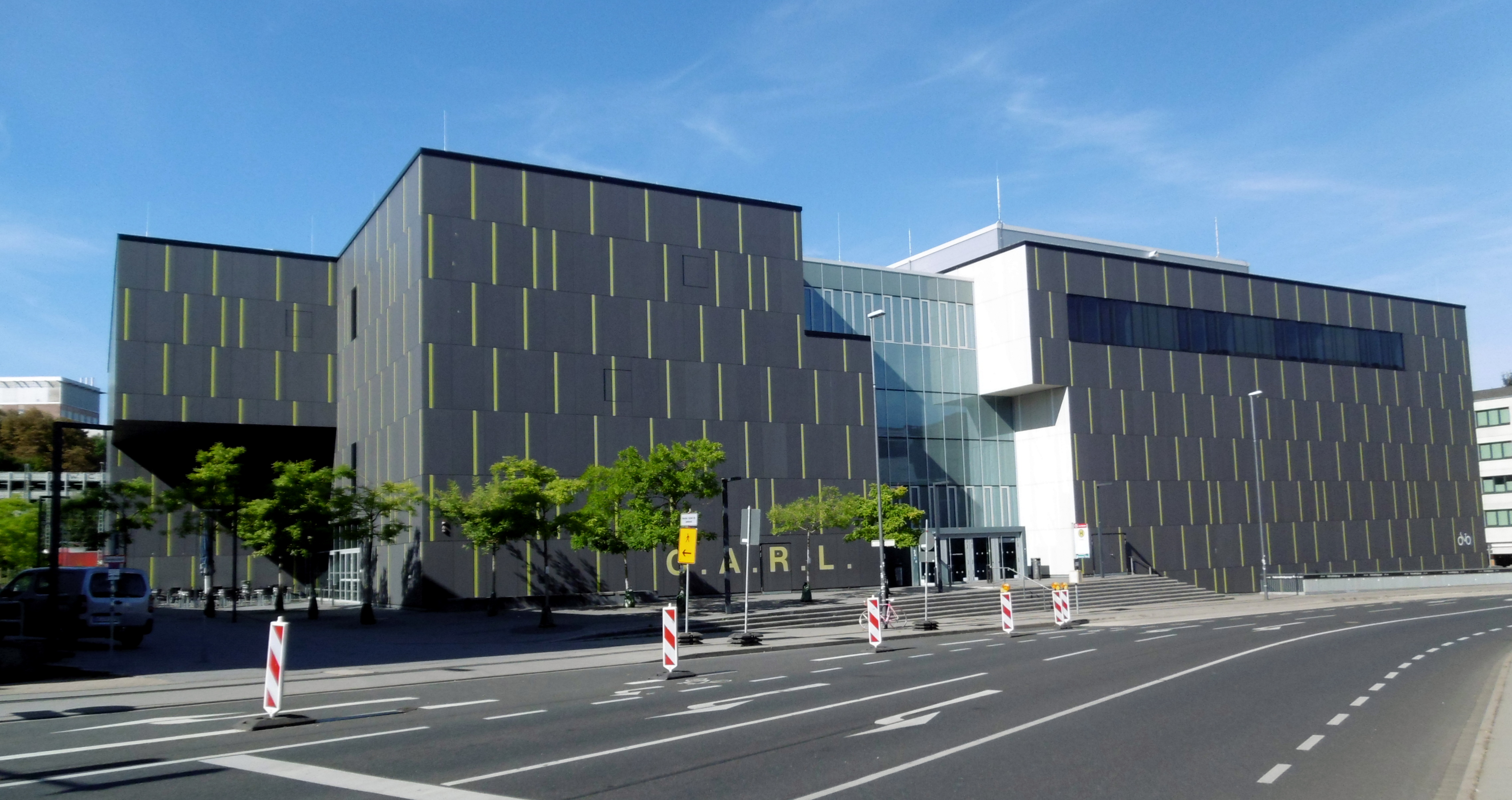
The newly built CARL in 2017, RWTH Aachen

RWTH Aachen University's 620 acres (250 ha) campus is located in the north-western part of the city Aachen. There are two core areas – midtown and Melaten district. The Main Building, SuperC student's center and the Kármán Hall are 500 m away from the city centre with the Aachen Cathedral, the Audimax (biggest lecture hall) and the main refectory are 200 m farther. Other points of interest include the university's botanical garden (Botanischer Garten Aachen).

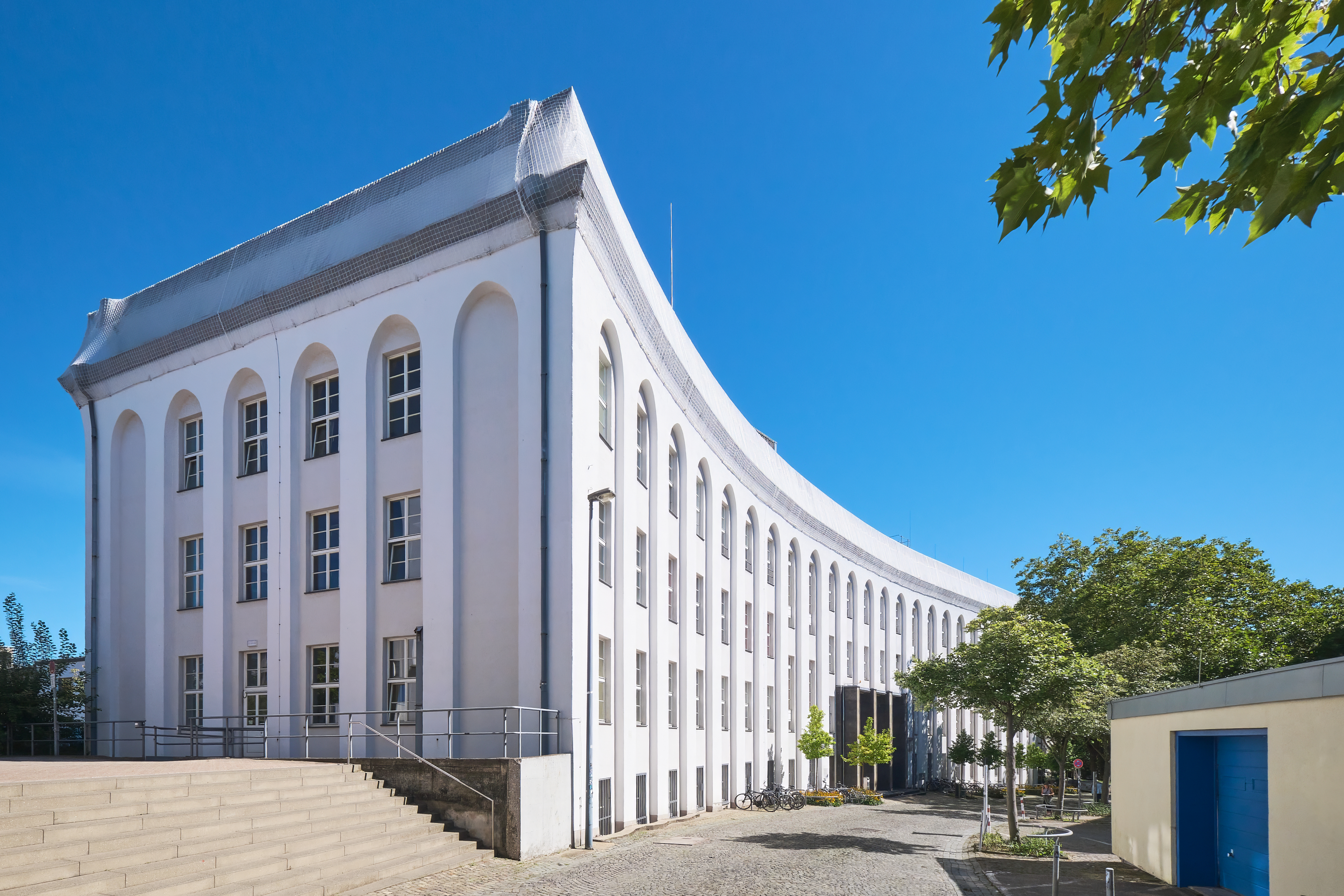
The Rogowski building, home of the Aachen Institute for Advanced Study in Computational Engineering Science

A new building, the so-called Central Auditorium for Research and Learning (CARL) was opened in 2017. It offers space for 4000 students and replaces Audimax as the largest lecture hall building. The name of the new central auditorium, which is going to contain different lecture halls, is a reference to Charlemagne, who reigned his empire from Aachen in the middle-ages.

The RWTH has external facilities in Jülich and Essen and owns, together with the University of Stuttgart, a house in Kleinwalsertal in the Austrian Alps.

The university is currently expanding in the city center and Melaten district. The SuperC, the new central service building for students, was opened in 2008. The groundbreaking for the new Campus-Melaten was in 2009.

== Internationality ==
Double degrees and student mobility are promoted with other technology universities through the TIME (Top Industrial Managers for Europe) network. Furthermore, the RWTH is member of the IDEA League, which is a strategic partnership among four of Europe's leading research universities, including TU Delft, Chalmers University of Technology, and ETH Zürich, and was the first German university starting an Undergraduate Research Opportunities Program in 2008.

More than 7,000 international students are currently enrolled within the undergraduate, graduate or PhD programme. Compared to other German universities the portion of international students at the RWTH Aachen is higher-than-average. The proximity of Aachen to the Netherlands, Belgium, and Luxembourg combined with the subsequent exposure to a variety of cultural heritages has placed RWTH Aachen University in a unique position with regards to the reflection and promotion of international aspects and intensive interaction with other universities.

In Asia, RWTH Aachen collaborates with Tsinghua University to offer Tsinghua-Aachen (Germany) Joint Master Program.

== Rankings and reputation ==
University rankings

Overall – Global & National
| QS World 2024 | 106 | 5 |
| THE World 2024 | 90 | 5 |
| ARWU World 2023 | 201–300 | 10–19 |

=== Overall ===
RWTH Aachen was ranked #105 globally (#6 nationally) in the QS World University Rankings 2026, #92 globally (#6 nationally) in the Times Higher Education World University Rankings 2026, and #201–300 globally (#10–19 nationally) in the ARWU World Rankings 2025.

=== Subject ===
In the 2023 QS Subject Ranking, RWTH Aachen ranks first in Germany in mechanical engineering and materials sciences. In the 2023 THE Subject Ranking, RWTH Aachen ranks second in Germany in engineering and computer science. In the 2022 ARWU Subject Ranking, RWTH Aachen ranks first in Germany in chemical engineering.

QS Subject Ranking 2023
| Subject | Global | National |
| Arts & Humanities | N/A | N/A |
|---|---|---|
| Architecture and Built Environment | 51–100 | 3–5 |
| Engineering and Technology | ▼55 | ▼4 |
| Engineering – Chemical | ▲38 | 2 |
| Engineering – Civil and Structural | 51–100 | 2–3 |
| Computer Science and Information Systems | ▼90 | 3 |
| Engineering – Electrical and Electronic | 45 | ▼3 |
| Engineering – Mechanical | 19 | 1 |
| Engineering – Mineral and Mining | ▲15 | ▼2 |
| Life Sciences & Medicine | N/A | N/A |
| Biological Sciences | 151–200 | ▼12–15 |
| Medicine | 201–250 | ▼14–15 |
| Natural Sciences | ▼85 | ▼6 |
| Chemistry | ▼66 | ▼5 |
| Earth and Marine Sciences | 151–200 | ▼14–15 |
| Environmental Sciences | 101–150 | 4–5 |
| Geology | 151–200 | 14–15 |
| Geophysics | ▲151–200 | ▲14–15 |
| Materials Sciences | ▲27 | 1 |
| Mathematics | ▼136 | ▼8 |
| Physics and Astronomy | ▲60 | 5 |
| Social Sciences & Management | ▼401–450 | ▼13–15 |
| Business and Management Studies | ▼201–250 | 5–8 |
| Economics and Econometrics | 301–350 | ▲12–15 |
| Education and Training | ▼251–300 | ▲11–14 |
| Statistics and Operational Research | 101–150 | 5–6 |

THE Subject Ranking 2023
| Subject | Global | National |
|---|---|---|
| Computer science | ▲50 | ▲2 |
| Engineering | ▼32 | 2 |
| Clinical & health | 201–250 | ▲12–16 |
| Physical sciences | ▼ =91 | ▲8 |

ARWU Subject Ranking 2022
| Subject | Global | National |
Natural Sciences
| Mathematics | 301–400 | ▲19–29 |
| Physics | 76–100 | 6–7 |
| Chemistry | 76–100 | ▲2–5 |
| Earth Sciences | 301–400 | ▼24–30 |
Engineering
| Mechanical Engineering | ▼51–75 | ▲1–2 |
| Electrical & Electronic Engineering | ▼151–200 | ▼5–6 |
| Telecommunication Engineering | 201–300 | ▼5–6 |
| Instruments Science & Technology | ▼201–300 | ▼3–6 |
| Biomedical Engineering | 101–150 | 6–10 |
| Computer Science & Engineering | 201–300 | ▲3–10 |
| Chemical Engineering | 76–100 | 1 |
| Materials Science & Engineering | 101–150 | 3–5 |
| Nanoscience & Nanotechnology | 101–150 | ▲3–5 |
| Energy Science & Engineering | 101–150 | 5–6 |
| Environmental Science & Engineering | 151–200 | 5–6 |
| Biotechnology | 101–150 | ▼5–7 |
| Mining & Mineral Engineering | 51–75 | 2 |
| Metallurgical Engineering | 36 | 3 |
Life Sciences
| Human Biological Sciences | 201–300 | ▲27–30 |
| Agricultural Sciences | 201–300 | ▲19–23 |
Medical Sciences
| Dentistry & Oral Sciences | 101–150 | 8–13 |
| Medical Technology | 51–75 | 9–12 |
| Pharmacy & Pharmaceutical Sciences | 101–150 | ▲10–14 |
Social Sciences
| Economics | 301–400 | ▲16–23 |
| Psychology | 201–300 | ▼18–23 |
| Business Administration | 201–300 | ▲5–10 |
| Management | 201–300 | 4–8 |

In 2009, two prominent German newspapers, Handelsblatt and Wirtschaftswoche, ranked RWTH Aachen the first place in Germany in the fields of mechanical engineering, electrical engineering, industrial engineering, and computer science. In 2012, Handelsblatt ranked The RWTH School of Business and Economics amongst top 10 within Germany. In the 2015 ranking published by DAAD together with Centre for Higher Education Development and Die Zeit, RWTH Aachen also stands on top among other German universities in the aforementioned fields of engineering and computer science.

=== Graduates ===
RWTH Aachen took 3rd place in 2018 based on the number of top managers in the German economy measured by the number of DAX board of management members. In 2019, RWTH Aachen took 2nd place. The top 3 universities in 2019 with the most top managers were LMU Munich, the RWTH Aachen and Technische Universität Darmstadt.

According to the Stepstone Salary Report for Graduates 2019/2020, graduates of RWTH Aachen are amongst the highest earners in Science, technology, engineering, and mathematics. From 2001 to 2013, national rankings regularly identified RWTH Aachen as one of the best universities in Germany in the fields of engineering (especially mechanical engineering, electrical engineering), as well as amongst the top three in computer science, physics, chemistry, and medicine.

== Organisation ==
Almost all basic lectures are held in German, but an increasing number of master programs require proficiency in English for admission.

=== Fees ===
RWTH Aachen is run by the federal state of North Rhine-Westphalia. Since the summer semester of 2004 the state of North Rhine-Westphalia allowed universities to request a maximum of €500 per semester as tuition fees. In the past, tuition fees applied solely for long-term students and second studies. Since the summer semester of 2007, all students enrolled at the RWTH Aachen had to pay these €500, if they were not exempt for one of several reasons put forth by the State of North Rhine-Westphalia.

Since 24 February 2011 study fees were abolished by the Landtag of North Rhine-Westphalia (Legislation for the Improvement of Equal Opportunities to University Admission) with effect from Winter Term 2011/12. Universities will receive 249 Mio Euro of national funding for measures that improve the quality of teaching (e.g., through additional teachers and tutors) as compensation. Tuition fees per semester are still being charged.

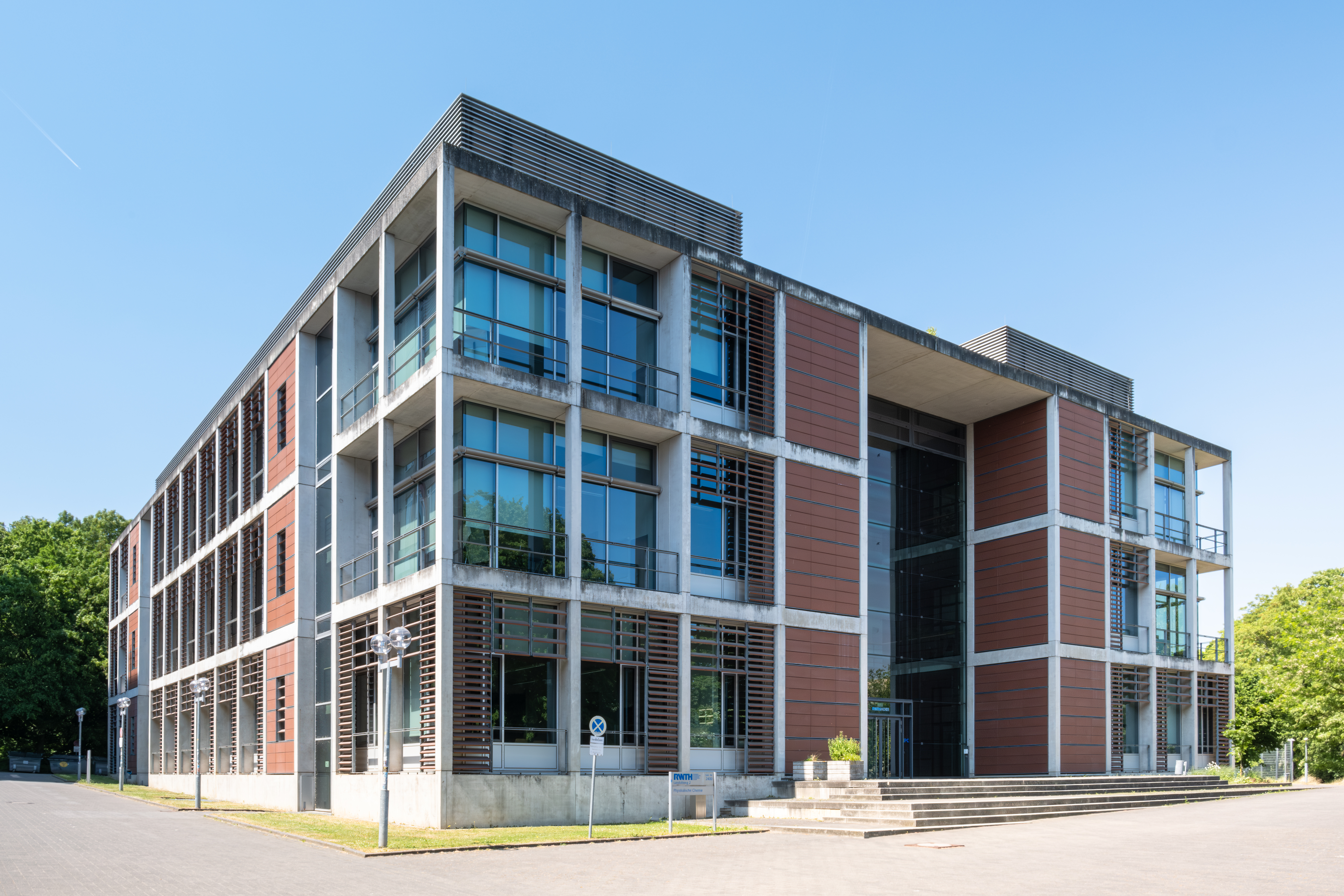
Institute for physical chemistry

=== Faculties ===
The RWTH is divided into ten faculties:

F 1 – Faculty of Mathematics and Natural Sciences
F 2 – Faculty of Architecture
F 3 – Faculty of Civil Engineering
F 4 – Faculty of Mechanical Engineering
F 5 – Faculty of Georesources and Materials Engineering
F 6 – Faculty of Electrical Engineering and Information Technology
F 7 – Faculty of Arts and Humanities
F 8 – Faculty of Business and Economics
F 9 – Faculty of Computer Science
F 10 – Faculty of Medicine

Faculty 9 was originally pedagogical sciences, but it was abandoned in 1989. Teacher education, however, continued. It was re-founded in 2025 as the faculty of computer science.

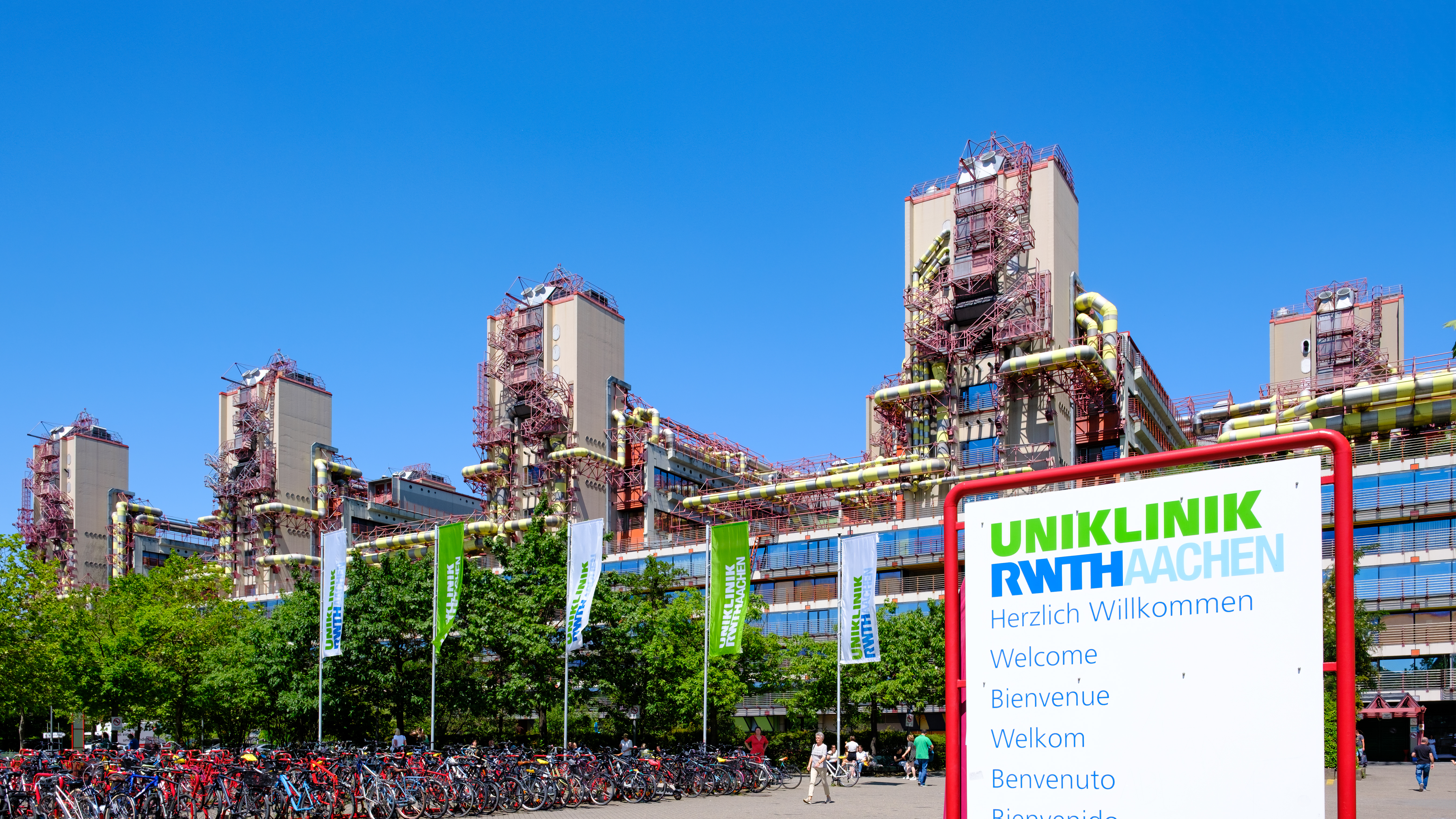
Klinikum Aachen (University hospital)

=== Fraunhofer-Institutes ===
The university cooperates with the Fraunhofer-Institutes situated in the Melaten district of Aachen. The institutes offer workshops, courses and lectures for the students of RWTH Aachen.

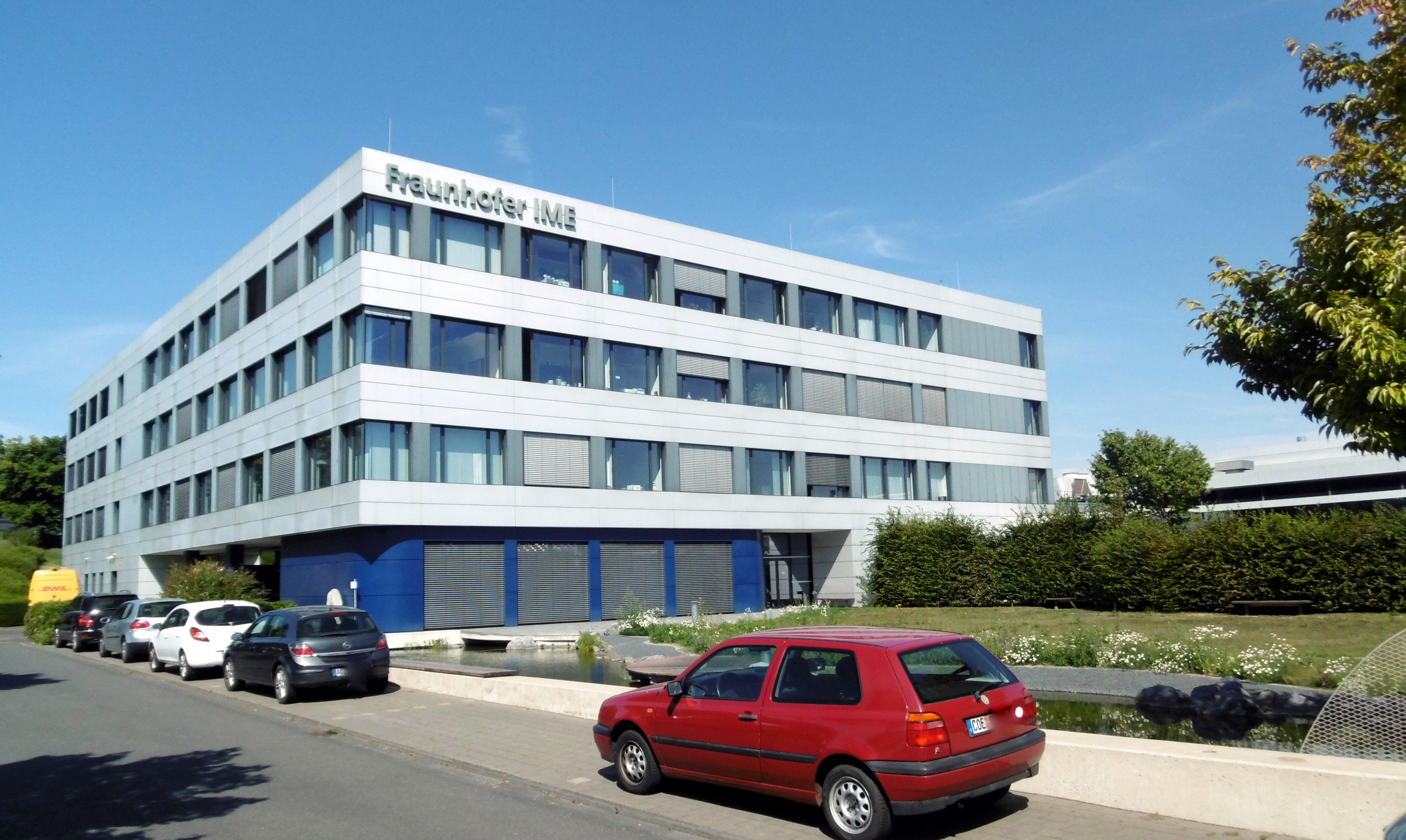
Fraunhofer-Institute for Molecular Biology and Applied Ecology

- Applied Information Technology (FIT) Sankt Augustin and Aachen
- Fraunhofer-Institute for Laser Technology ILT
- Fraunhofer-Institute for Production Technology IPT
- Fraunhofer-Institute for Molecular Biology and Applied Ecology

=== Jülich-Aachen Research Alliance (JARA) ===
The Jülich-Aachen Research Alliance (JARA) was founded by the RWTH Aachen and Forschungszentrum Jülich in 2007. Five sections are coordinated by the research facilities:

- JARA-Brain (Diagnosis and therapy of neurologic sickness)
- JARA-Fit (Fundamentals of future information technology)
- JARA-HPC (High Performance Computing)
- JARA-Energy (Energy research)
- JARA-FAME (Forces and matter experiments)

=== Graduate schools ===
==== Aachen Institute for advanced study in Computational Engineering Science ====
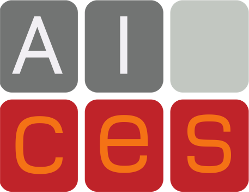

The Aachen Institute for advanced study in Computational Engineering Science (AICES) is a graduate school established in 2006 under the German Universities Excellence Initiative at the RWTH Aachen University. Research at AICES is broadly in the area of Computational engineering, solving inverse problems that find applications in mathematics, computer science and engineering, mechanical engineering and natural sciences. AICES is a collaborative effort of 47 principal investigators from 8 academic divisions of RWTH Aachen University, as well as Max Planck Institute for Iron Research and Forschungszentrum Jülich.

== Associations ==
- RWTH Aachen – North American Alumni Association: Prof. Dr. Burkhard Rauhut, former president of the RWTH, and Prof. Dr. Laszlo Baksay, President of the newly founded "Association of Alumni, Friends and Supporters of RWTH Aachen University in North-America" signed the founding statement for a new branch of the RWTH Alumni Community in Melbourne (Florida) in May 2006.
- AStA (Students' Union)
- AISA (Assoc. of Indian Students in Aachen)
- GATS (Association of Thai Students in Aachen)
- ISA e.V (Iranian Students Association)
- Pakistan Student Association
- MexAS – Mexikanische Aachener Studierende (Mexican Students' Association)
- PPI Aachen (Vereinigung Indonesischer Studenten e.V in Aachen, English: Indonesian Students Association in Aachen, Indonesian: Perhimpunan Pelajar Indonesia di Aachen, an autonomous branch of Perhimpunan Pelajar Indonesia di Jerman)
- ADDI (Aachen Drone Development Initiative)
- Flugwissenschaftliche Vereinigung Aachen (abbreviation: FVA, English: Flight Research Association Aachen). The FVA academic flying group is closely affiliated with RWTH Aachen and overseen by IDAFLIEG (Interessengemeinschaft deutscher akademischer Fliegergruppen e.V.).
- Team Sonnenwagen Aachen Student team founded in late 2015 with the goal to develop and build solar cars for the World Solar Challenge in Australia. In 2017, the team participated for the first time in the challenge.
- Ecurie Aix – Student team founded in 1999 to compete in the formula student
- SKY Campus Aachen – A student initiative that aims to boost awareness for mental health in the student community, through mindfulness, breathwork and yoga.
- Space Team Aachen
- TechAachen
- Ecogenium

== Notable faculty and alumni ==
RWTH Aachen University has educated several notable individuals, including some Nobel laureates in physics and chemistry. The scientists and alumni of the RWTH Aachen played a major role in chemistry, medicine, electrical, and mechanical engineering. For example, Nobel laureate Peter Debye received a degree in electrical engineering from RWTH Aachen and is known for the Debye model and Debye relaxation. Paul Deurenberg, received a degree in chemistry and became known for his expertise in energy metabolism, food consumption, and body composition. Another example, Helmut Zahn and his team of the Institute for Textile Chemistry were the first who synthesised insulin in 1963 and they were nominated for Nobel Prize. Another example is B.J. Habibie, the third president of Indonesia that contributed in many aviation advancements. Franz Josef Och was the chief architect of Google Translate.
