= Max Planck Institute for Software Systems =

Computer Science research institute

- Institute's logo
- Abbreviation: MPI-SWS
- Formation: 2004; 22 years ago
- Type: research institute
- Headquarters: Saarbrücken, Kaiserslautern, Germany
- Website: www.mpi-sws.org

The Max Planck Institute for Software Systems (MPI-SWS) is a computer science research institute co-located in Saarbrücken and Kaiserslautern, Germany. The institute is chartered to conduct basic research in all areas related to the design, analysis, modelling, implementation and evaluation of complex software systems. Particular areas of interest include programming systems, distributed and networked systems, embedded and autonomous systems, as well as crosscutting aspects like formal modelling and analysis of software systems, security, dependability and software engineering. It joins over 80 other institutes run by the Max-Planck-Gesellschaft, which conduct basic research in medicine, biology, chemistry, physics, technology and the humanities.

One of the two bases of the Max Planck Institute for Software Systems is located on the Saarland Informatics Campus, itself based on the campus of the Saarland University, a cluster of research institutes working in the field of computer science and informatics. Located immediately adjacent to the Saarbrücken base is the MPI for Informatics (MPII) for which the institute works closely and shares core IT and administrative services. The institutes other base is on the campus of the University of Kaiserslautern-Landau, working in co-operation with its computer science department and the Fraunhofer Institutes for Experimental Software Engineering and for Industrial Mathematics.

== Research School ==
The International Max Planck Research School for Computer Science (IMPRS-CS) was the graduate school of the MPI-SWS and the MPII. It was operational between 2000 and 2019 and offered a fully funded PhD-Program (in cooperation with Saarland University). The spokesperson was Prof. Dr. Gerhard Weikum.

It was succeeded by the International Max Planck Research School on Trustworthy Computing (in cooperation with Computer Science Department at Saarland University, and the Computer Science Department at TU Kaiserslautern). The spokesperson is Anja Feldmann.

== Organization ==
The institute was founded in November 2004, and ever since is actively seeking to augment its plant of researchers. Summing up both locations, the institute has a total capacity of 5 directors, 12 tenure-track or tenured faculty members, and approximately 100 postdocs and doctoral students.

Currently, the institute comprises the following directors:

- Peter Druschel, head of the Distributed Systems and Operating Systems Group.
- Derek Dreyer, head of the Foundations of Programming Group.
- Paul Francis, head of the Large Scale Internet Systems Group.
- Krishna Gummadi, head of the Networked Systems Group.
- Rupak Majumdar, head of the Rigorous Software Engineering Group.
- Joël Ouaknine, head of the Foundations of Algorithmic Verification Group.

and the following tenured or tenure-track faculty members:

- Bjorn Brandenburg, head of the Real-Time Systems Group.
- Deepak Garg, head of the Foundations of Computer Security Group.
- Manuel Gomez Rodriguez, head of the Learning in Networks Group.
- Antoine Kaufmann.
- Adish Singla.
- Mariya Toneva.
- Viktor Vafeiadis, head of the Software Analysis and Verification Group.
- Georg Zetzsche, head of the Models of Computation Group.

== See also ==
- Max Planck Institute for Informatics
- Max Planck Society
