= T-Labs =

Research and development unit of Deutsche Telekom

Coordinates: 52°30′47″N 13°19′12″E

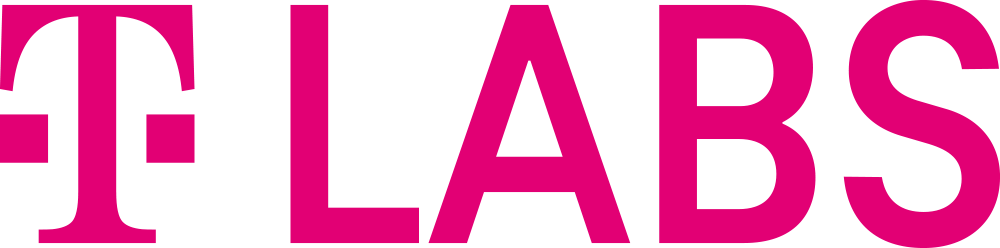
- Formation: 2004
- Type: Research Institute, Public Private Partnership
- Purpose: Telecommunications research
- Headquarters: Berlin
- Location: Bonn, Berlin, Beersheba, Budapest, Vienna
- Members: EIT Digital
- SVP and Head of T-Labs: Dr. Alex Choi
- Parent organization: Deutsche Telekom, Technische Universität Berlin
- Staff: about 300
- Website: laboratories.telekom.com
- Formerly called: Telekom Innovation Laboratories

T-Labs, formerly known as Telekom Innovation Laboratories, is the R&D unit of Deutsche Telekom. T-Labs current research areas are: Future Networks, Spatial Computing and Decentralized Systems.

== History ==
T-Labs were founded in 2004 as the central research and development institute of Deutsche Telekom under the direction of Manfred Jeronim. At the same time, T-Labs are also a so-called affiliated institute of Technische Universität Berlin (TU Berlin), meaning that T-Labs is a privately organized entity that is closely integrated in the teaching and research activities conducted at TU Berlin. This concept promotes intensive collaboration between research and industry. Experts, entrepreneurs and researchers work together on innovations intended for real-world application scenarios and on disruptive technologies in the area of information and communications technology.

T-Labs follow a consistent Open Innovation approach and are themselves an innovation as an affiliated institute and thus pioneered a new form of research and development. In a report for the Organisation for Economic Co-operation and Development (OECD), T-Labs have been presented as a benchmark example of modern innovation management.

At the beginning, 25 Deutsche Telekom employees and about 50 scientists from many countries worked at the T-Labs. Peter Möckel took over the management from November 2004 to 2011. Under his leadership, several professorships were established at the TU Berlin.In 2008, 100 other telecom experts were integrated into the T-Labs and further scientists were hired in parallel. First companies were founded.

Heinrich Arnold was responsible for the reorientation of Telekom Laboratories to more application and implementation-oriented topics. In the course of this reorientation, he took over the management of T-Labs from 2011 until 2016. During this period the foundations were laid for three new business units in the area of cloud computing, smart home and mobile payment for and within Deutsche Telekom. In addition, further focus areas with the topics of health, energy, Machine to machine and media were established. As a result, a number of cross-industrial projects have been carried out for the digital industry, such as in the port of Hamburg in 2012 with industrial partners such as SAP SE, Adidas, Claas, Osram, Siemens, KUKA and Trumpf.

Under the leadership of Heinrich Arnold, about 20 new spin-offs were founded, among others Trust2Core, SureNow, Litedesk, Motionlogic, Benocs, Soundcall, Zimory, Bitplaces, Schaltzeit as well as the digital cloud-based telecommunications service immmr (2016).

In 2016, the EU-Labs programme were found together with the TU-Berlin, to expand the international collaboration. The first institution within this strategy was established at the Eötvös Loránd University in Budapest. The new professorship "Data science and Engineering" has its focus on the evaluation of economic and environmental relevant data with the help from mobile networks. In 2017, another professorship at the TU Vienna was instituted.

Since 2017 the T-Labs were under the lead of Dr. Alex Choi and further on of John Calian - from May 2018, until April 2020. John Calian was the Head of the Telekom Innovation Laboratories (T-Labs) and set up 3 focus topics: Blockchain, Intelligence and Experience.

In April 2022, Dr. Alex Choi took over the leadership of T-Labs.

== Organization and fields of research ==
T-Labs operates within Deutsche Telekom, supporting various corporate devisions with a focus on network and product innovation. Through partnerships with institutions such as the Technical University of Berlin and other universities worldwide, it facilitates research collaboration between academic and industry.

As of January 2021, the main focus topics of T-Labs are:

Decentralized Systems: This research area deals with the distribution of authority over data among multiple players and making intermediaries obsolete.

Spatial Computing: is focused on enabling advanced user interaction, at higher standards for various customer segments by using the next generation XR technologies and human-computer interfaces.

Future Networks:

From 2017 until 2020 the T-Labs team was focused on working on three main topics:

- Blockchain and Smart Cities
- New Media Experience
- Deep Learning / Machine Learning

The fields of research at TU Berlin included

- Internet Network Architectures, (2006 - 2013) by Anja Feldmann
- Quality and Usability, (2007 - 2015) by Prof. Sebastian Möller
- Interaction Design and Media (2008 - 2010) by Prof. Gesche Joost (since 2010 professor in Design Research at Berlin University of the Arts)
- Autonomous Security (2009 - 2011) by Tansu Alpcan (now at University of Melbourne)
- Assessment of IP-based Applications, (2009 - 2015) by Prof. Alexander Raake (since 2015 professor at Technische Universität Ilmenau)
- Service-centric Networking, (since 2009) by Prof. Axel Küpper
- Security in Telecommunications, (since 2010) by Prof. Jean-Pierre Seifert

Other prioritised topics of the partners were:

- Data- and network security as well as social networks (since 2006) at Ben-Gurion University of the Negev by Prof. Yuval Elovici
- Design research and Design Research Lab (since 2010) at Berlin University of the Arts by Prof. Gesche Joost
- Data Science and Engineering (since 2016) at Eötvös Loránd University by Dr. Thomás Horváth
- Data Intelligence (since 2017) at TU Vienna by Prof. Allan Hanbury

== Research scientists ==
Some of the experts and scientists who have been working for the T-Labs (who can be found via Wikipedia) :

- Heinrich Arnold
- Yaniv Altshuler
- Georg Essl
- Anja Feldmann
- Gesche Joost
- Sebastian Möller
- Alexander Raake
- Sascha Spors
