= Bin Yang =

Professor of computer science

- Born: Xi'an, Shaanxi, China
- Occupation: Professor
- Employer: Aalborg University

Bin Yang (Chinese: 杨彬; Pinyin: Yáng Bīn) is a professor of computer science the department of computer science, Aalborg University. His research interests include data management and machine learning.

== Education and career ==
Bin Yang received his bachelor and master degrees from Northwestern Polytechnical University, China in 2004 and 2007, respectively, and his Ph.D. from Fudan University in China in 2010. From 2010 to 2011, he worked at the Databases and Information Systems department at Max-Planck-Institut für Informatik in Germany. From 2011 to 2014, he was employed at the department of computer science, Aarhus University. He has been employed at Aalborg University since 2014.

At the present moment, he works on a number of different projects:

- Time Series Analytics and Spatio-temporal Data Management, funded by Huawei, 2020 - 2022.
- Light-AI for Cognitive Power Electronics, funded by Villum Synergy Programme, 2020 - 2022.
- Advance: A Data-Intensive Paradigm for Dynamic, Uncertain Networks, funded by Independent Research Fund Denmark, 2019 - 2023.
- Algorithmic Foundations for Data-Intensive Routing, funded by The Danish Agency for Science and Higher Education, 2019 - 2021.
- Astra: AnalyticS of Time seRies in spAtial networks, funded by Independent Research Fund Denmark, 2018 - 2021.
- Distinguished Scholar, funded by The Technical Faculty of IT and Design, Aalborg University, 2018 - 2021.

== Awards ==
Bin Yang has received a series of awards throughout his career:

- Sapere Aude Research Leader, Independent Research Fund Denmark, 2018.
- Distinguished Scholar, The Technical Faculty of IT and Design, Aalborg University, 2018.
- Early Career Distinguished Lecturer, 20th IEEE International Conference on Mobile Data Management (MDM), 2019.
- Distinguished Program Committee Member, 28th International Joint Conference on Artificial Intelligence (IJCAI), 2019
- Best paper award at IEEE 14th International Conference on Mobile Data Management (MDM2013), Milan, Italy
- Best demo award at IEEE 14th International Conference on Mobile Data Management (MDM2013), Milan, Italy
- 2015 best paper in Pervasive and Embedded Computing, Shanghai Computer Academy

== Selected publications ==
- Sean Bin Yang, Chenjuan Guo, Jilin Hu, Jian Tang, and Bin Yang. Unsupervised Path Representation Learning with Curriculum Negative Sampling. IJCAI 2021.
- Razvan-Gabriel Cirstea, Tung Kieu, Chenjuan Guo, Bin Yang, and Sinno Jialin Pan. EnhanceNet: Plugin Neural Networks for Enhancing Correlated Time Series Forecasting. ICDE 2021.
- Sean Bin Yang, Chenjuan Guo, and Bin Yang. Context-Aware Path Ranking in Road Networks. TKDE 2021.
- Simon Aagaard Pedersen, Bin Yang, and Christian S. Jensen. Anytime Stochastic Routing with Hybrid Learning. PVLDB 13(9): 1555-1567 (2020).
- Tung Kieu, Bin Yang, Chenjuan Guo, and Christian S. Jensen. Outlier Detection for Time Series with Recurrent Autoencoder Ensembles. IJCAI 2019, 2725–2732.
- Jilin Hu, Chenjuan Guo, Bin Yang, and Christian S. Jensen. Stochastic Weight Completion for Road Networks using Graph Convolutional Networks. ICDE 2019, 1274–1285.
- Chenjuan Guo, Bin Yang, Jilin Hu, and Christian S. Jensen. Learning to Route with Sparse Trajectory Sets. ICDE 2018, 1073–1084.
- Bin Yang, Jian Dai, Chenjuan Guo, Christian S. Jensen, and Jilin Hu. PACE: A PAth-CEntric Paradigm For Stochastic Path Finding. The VLDB Journal 27(2): 153-178 (2018).
- Jian Dai, Bin Yang, Chenjuan Guo, and Zhiming Ding. Personalized Route Recommendation using Big Trajectory Data. ICDE 2015, 543–554, Seoul, Korea, April 2015.
- Bin Yang, Manohar Kaul, and Christian S. Jensen. Using Incomplete Information for Complete Weight Annotation of Road Networks. TKDE 26(5):1267-1279.
- Bin Yang, Chenjuan Guo, and Christian S. Jensen. Travel Cost Inference from Sparse, Spatio-Temporally Correlated Time Series Using Markov Models. PVLDB 6(9):769-780. VLDB 2013, Riva del Garda, Trento, Italy, August 2013.
