= Druschel =

Druschel is a German surname. Notable people with the surname include:

- Alfred Druschel (1917–1945), German combat pilot
- Desi Druschel (born 1976), American baseball coach
- Peter Druschel (born 1959), German computer scientist
- Rick Druschel (born 1952), American football player
