= SmartWeb =

SmartWeb may refer to:

- Artificial intelligence software developed by the German Research Centre for Artificial Intelligence
- SmartWeb mobile, content-control software for Apple iPhone/iPod Touch
- An online grading system for United States schools
