= GSZ =

GSZ may refer to:

- German Society for Stem Cell Research (German: Deutsche Gesellschaft für Stammzellforschung)
- Granite Mountain Air Station, in Alaska, United States
- Grün Stadt Zürich, a municipal department of the city of Zurich, Switzerland
- GSZ Stadium, in Larnaca, Cyprus
  - GSZ Stadium (1928), demolished 1989
