= Saarland University =

Public research university in Germany

Coordinates: 49°15′20″N 7°2′30″E

- Universität des Saarlandes
- Latin: Universitas Saraviensis
- Other name: UdS
- Type: Public
- Established: 1948
- Budget: €436 million
- President: Ludger Santen
- Academic staff: 1,919
- Administrative staff: 1,544
- Students: 16,300
- Location: Saarbrücken and Homburg, Saarland, Germany
- Campus: multiple sites
- Colors: blue
- Website: www.uni-saarland.de
- Location within Germany Location within Saarland

Saarland University (German: Universität des Saarlandes, pronounced [univɛʁziˈtɛːt dɛs ˈzaːɐ̯landəs]) is a public research university located in Saarbrücken, the capital of the German state of Saarland. It was founded in 1948 in Homburg in co-operation with France and is organized in six faculties that cover all major fields of science. In 2007, the university was recognized as an excellence center for computer science in Germany.

Thanks to bilingual German and French staff, the university has an international profile, which has been underlined by its proclamation as "European University" in 1950 and by establishment of Europa-Institut as its "crown and symbol" in 1951.

Ten academics have been honored with the highest German research prize, the Gottfried Wilhelm Leibniz Prize, while working at Saarland University.

== History ==
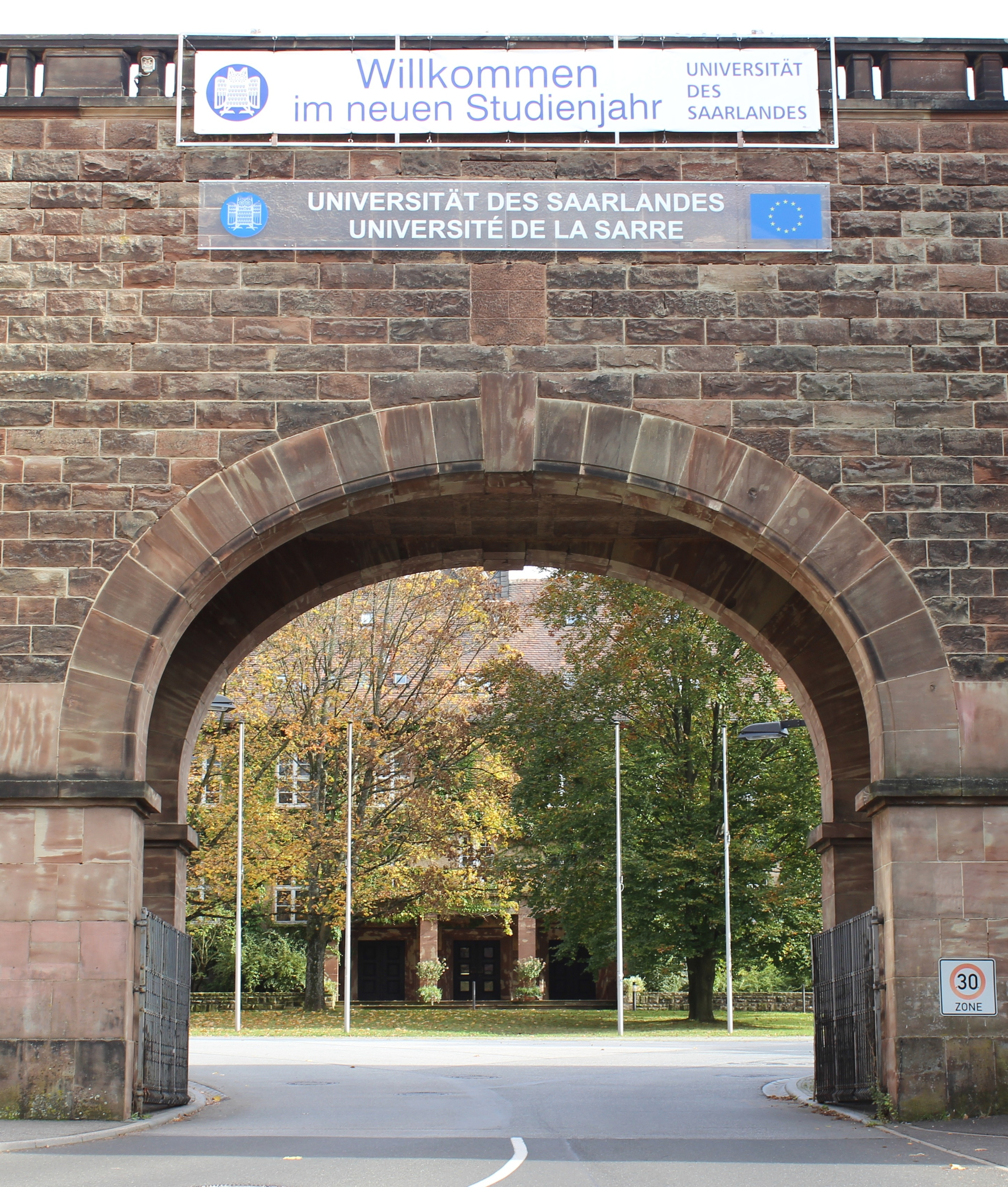
The entrance to Saarland University in 1948 and 2014

Saarland University, the first to be established after World War II, was founded in November 1948 with the support of the French Government and under the auspices of the University of Nancy.

At the time the Saarland found itself in the special situation of being partly autonomous and linked to France by economic and monetary union. With its combination of the German and French educational traditions and the dual languages of instruction, the university had a European perspective right from the start. Prior to the foundation of the university, clinical training courses for medical students at the state hospital, Saarland University Hospital, in Homburg, Saarland, had been introduced in January 1946 and the "Centre Universitaire d'Etudes Supérieures de Hombourg" established on 8 May 1947 under the patronage of the University of Nancy. Students in certain disciplines can obtain degree certificates from both universities.

The first president of the independent university in 1948 was Jean Barriol. In the same year the university introduced the first courses in law, philosophy and languages.

In the 1950s Saarland University joined the Association of West-German Universities and accepted a more centralized organizational structure, and the Europa-Institut is established as a European politics and law think tank.

== Organization and administration ==
The university is headed by a board, which includes a president and five vice presidents, responsible for planning and strategy, research and technology transfer, education, and administration and finance, respectively. The president is elected by both the senate and the council in separate votes.

The senate, consisting of nine professors, three students, three academic and two administrative staff members, acts as the legislative branch. Further, the university has a council which makes strategic decisions, allocates funding, and supervises the board. The council's members are representatives of private companies and academic institutions including other universities, in addition to representatives of the university's professors, staff members, and students.

The university is divided into six faculties:

- Faculty of Human and Business Sciences
- Faculty of Medicine
- Faculty of Mathematics and Computer Science
- Faculty of Natural Sciences and Technology
- Faculty of Humanities
- Faculty of Law

== Academic profile ==
=== Research ===
Saarland University is known for research in Computer Science, nano technology, medicine, European relations, politics and law. The university campus and the surrounding area is home to several research institutes, affiliated with various independent research societies and private companies, focused on primary and applied research.

Buildings in the university science park just outside the campus

- Max Planck Institute for Computer Science
- Max Planck Institute for Software Systems
- Neuroexplicit Models of Language, Vision, and Action
- German Research Centre for Artificial Intelligence – DFKI
- CISPA – Helmholtz Center for Information Security
- Dagstuhl, the Leibniz Center for Informatics
- Fraunhofer IZFP
- Fraunhofer Institute for Biomedical Engineering
- Society for Environmentally Compatible Process Technology
- Institut of the society for the promotion of the applied information research
- Leibniz-Institute for New Materials INM
- KIST – Korea Institute of Science and Technology Europe Research Society.
- Intel Visual Computing Institute
- Centre for Bioinformatics Saar
- Institute for Formal Ontology and Medical Information Science – IFOMIS
- HIPS – Helmholtz Institute for Pharmaceutical Research Saarland

=== Cooperation ===
Saarland University is part of the Software-Cluster, a local association of universities, research institutes and IT companies in Karlsruhe, Darmstadt, Kaiserslautern, Waldorf and Saarbrücken with the purpose of fostering business software development.

== Student life ==
The Studierendenwerk in Saarland offers four public dormitories for students: Waldhaus, Rotenberg, Wohnheim E, and Guckelsberg. Language courses at Saarland University are free for all students. Students can also participate in sports courses offered by the university under Hochschulsport. Student organizations and university bodies frequently organize events on the campus. The center for International Students (ZiS) coordinates a wide range of events aimed at international students. The university offers several support services for national and international students, including a mentorship program, career workshops, and social and academic events to support academic integration and networking.

=== Computer Science Students' Representative Council ===
Students that study a department under SIC (except Business Informatics, Computational Linguistics, and Mathematics and Computer Science; which have their own representative councils) are represented by the Computer Science Students' Representative Council, a body of students elected annually by the students of the SIC. Mainly, the council's mission is to improve the study conditions. Other activities of the council include organizing social events, holding introductory events for new students, and providing the students with a free printer.

== Rankings ==
University rankings

Overall – Global & National
QS World 2024	600	35
ARWU World 2023	501–600	32–36

Saarland University is recognized in several university ranking systems. In the QS World University Rankings of 2024, the institution was ranked 600th globally and 35th on a national level. The university's standing was slightly higher in the ARWU World 2022 rankings, where it was positioned within the 501–600 range globally and between 32nd and 36th nationally.

It ranked in the 251-300 range in the field of Computer Science and Information Systems. In the Academic Ranking of World Universities 2024 (ARWU), it was ranked in the 401-500 range globally and 30-35 in Germany.

In the CWTS Leiden Ranking 2024, Saarland University was ranked 36th in Germany in Mathematics and Computer Science in terms of scientific impact, which is based on the total number of publications and citation percentage of publications.

In the CHE University Ranking of 2024, the computer science department was ranked second in Germany in terms of courses offered. In the funding report of the DFG of 2024, which consists of grants between 2020 and 2022, Saarland University ranked 25th in Germany in the field of engineering, where computer science is one of the strongest disciplines.

Other CHE University rankings include:

- CHE University Ranking 2024,
- CHE University Ranking 2023 for Business Informatics,
- CHE University Ranking 2021,
- CHE Master's Ranking 2021,
- DFG Funding Ranking 2021.

In a Gründungsradar (start-up radar) survey conducted in 2025 by Stifterverband für die Deutsche Wissenschaft, Saarland University ranked 2nd among 48 German universities in supporting research spin-offs and startup activity. In 2023, it ranked 3rd in the Triple E Awards for "Entrepreneurial University of the Year" for Europe.

== Internationality ==
Saarland University partners with 550 higher education institutions in 52 countries around the world. As of Winter Semester 24/25, 3739 international students study at the university, corresponding to around 23% of all students, which is higher than the national 16% average. Approximately, 23% of the research assistants and 7% of the professors in the university come from abroad.

As of Winter Semester 24/25, 2,633 students are enrolled at the Saarland Informatics Campus, with 737 female students (28%) and 1,291 international students (49%).

== University hospital ==
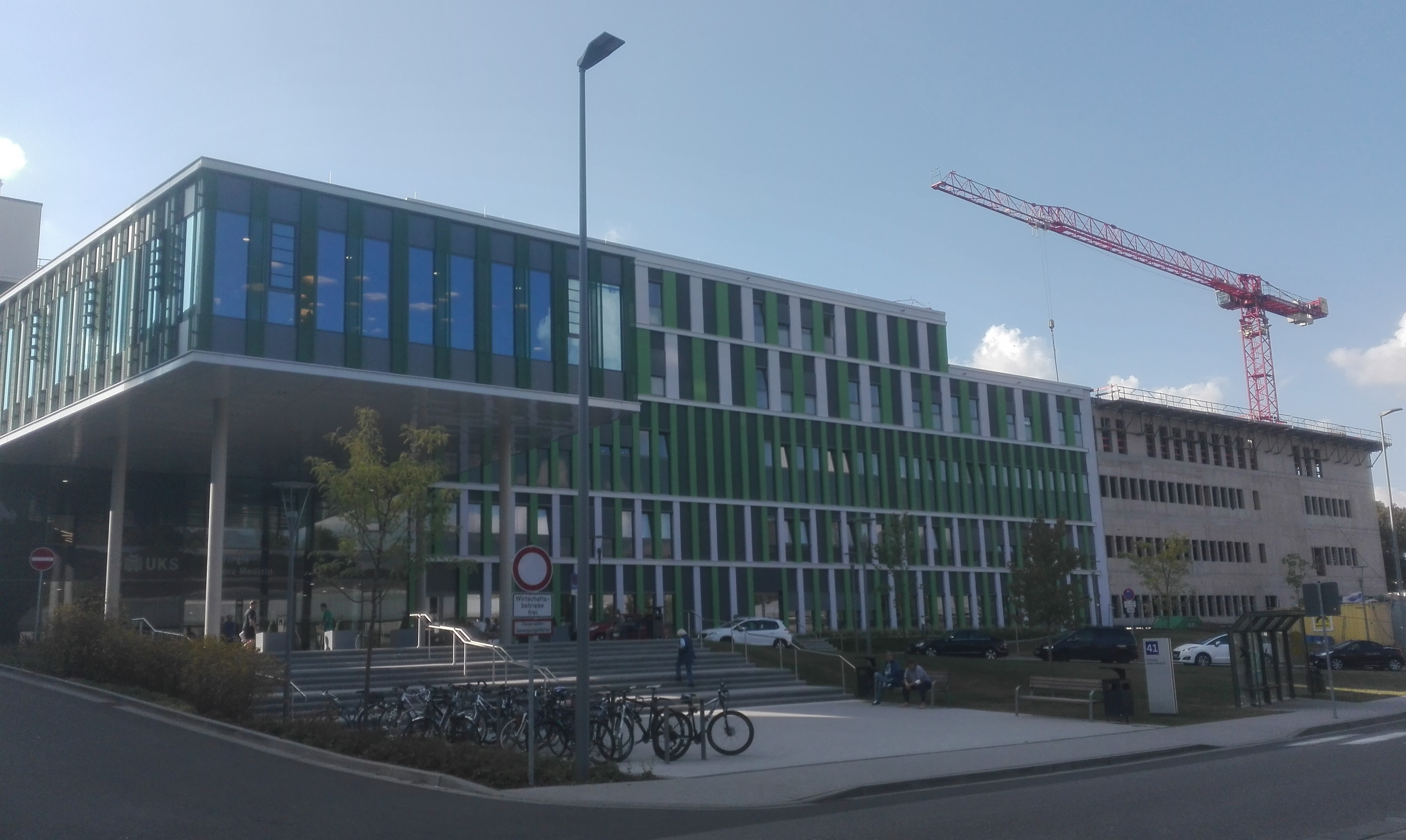
University hospital

The University Hospital of the Saarland (German: Universitätsklinikum des Saarlandes or UKS) is the hospital of Saarland University in Homburg, Saarland, Germany.

It is concentrated on a campus south of the city center, with more than 100 clinic buildings across more than 200 hectares.

== Saarland Informatics Campus ==
Saarland Informatics Campus
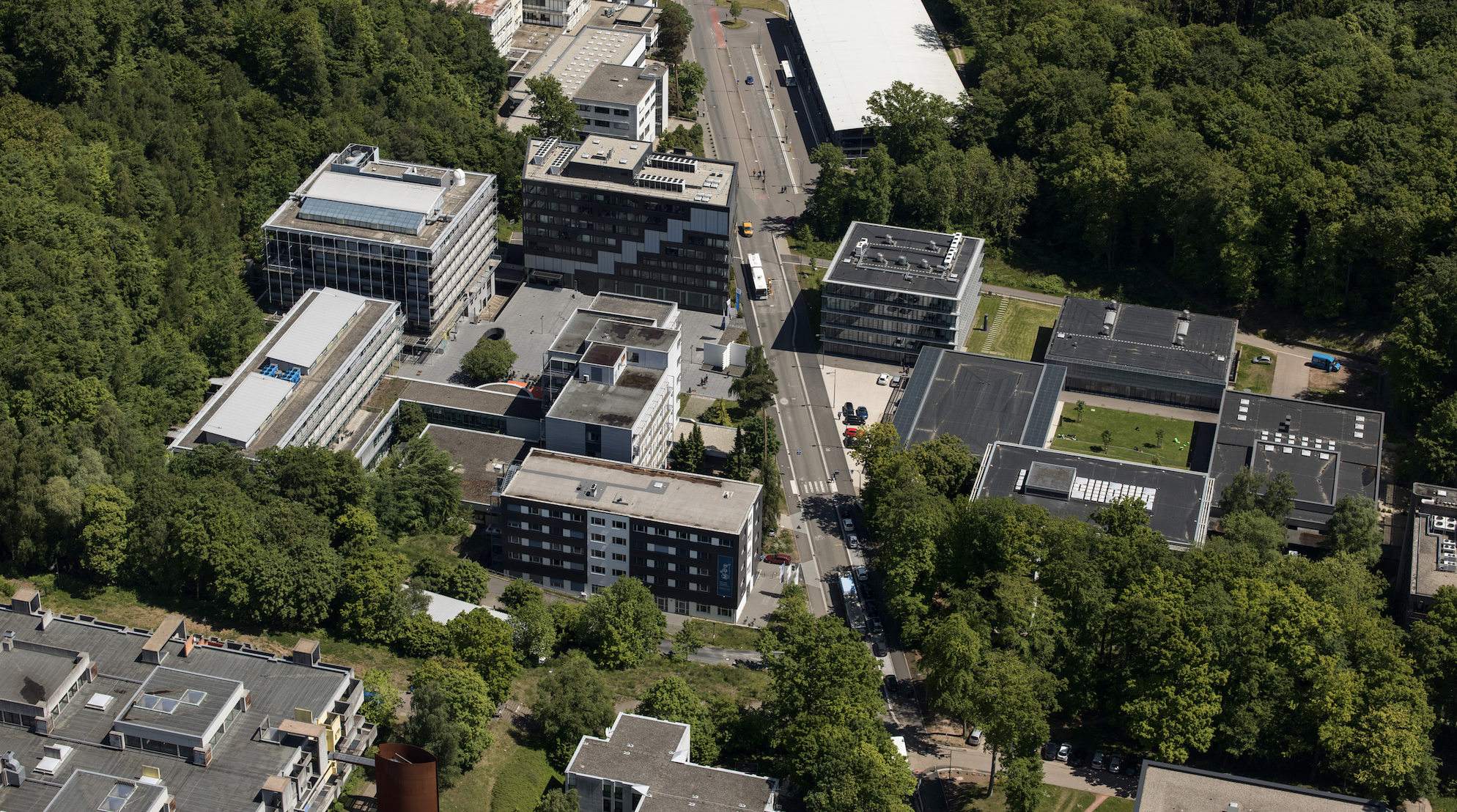
- East of the Saarland University campus, the E buildings, Saarland Informatics Campus
- Other name: SIC
- Type: Public
- Parent institution: Saarland University
- Location: Saarbrücken, Germany
- Campus: Suburban
- Study Programs: 24
- Website: https://saarland-informatics-campus.de/en/

Saarland Informatics Campus (SIC) is a center for computer science located on the Saarbrücken campus of Saarland University, a public university in Saarland, Germany. It integrates multiple research institutions and three departments of Saarland University: Department of Computer Science, Department of Mathematics, and Department of Language Science and Technology.

=== Research ===
SIC focuses on research across 16 fields: Algebra, Algorithms, Applied Analysis, Artificial Intelligence and Machine Learning, Computational Biology and Life Sciences, Computational Linguistics, Data Science, Didactics of Computers Science and Mathematics, Formal Methods, Human-Computer Interaction, Mathematical Data Analysis, Numerical Mathematics, Security and Cryptography, Software and Hardware Systems, Stochastics, Visual and Geometric Computing.

SIC participates in Germany's excellence initiative. As a participant, it received a Cluster of Excellence "Multimodal Computing and Interaction" (2007-2019) and a Graduate School of Computer Science in 2007. SIC is involved in many multi-institutional projects, some of which include:

- Collaborative Research Center (CRC) Transregio (TRR) 248: Foundations of Perspicuous Software Systems, funded by the German Research Foundation (DFG);
- CRC 1102: Information Density and Linguistic Encoding, funded by the DFG;
- CRC TRR-195: Symbolic Tools in Mathematics and their Applications, funded by the DFG;
- RTG: Neuroexplicit Models of Language, Vision, and Action, funded by the DFG;
- Information Density and Linguistic Encoding (IDeaL), funded by the DFG;
- Interdisciplinary Institute for Societal Computing (I2SC);
- Explainable Intelligent Systems, funded by Volkswagen Foundation;
- ELLIS Unit Saarbrücken AI & Machine Learning "SAM";
- Centre for European Research in Trusted AI (CERTAIN), funded by European Regional Development Fund;
- Zuse School ELIZA.

==== Research institutes ====
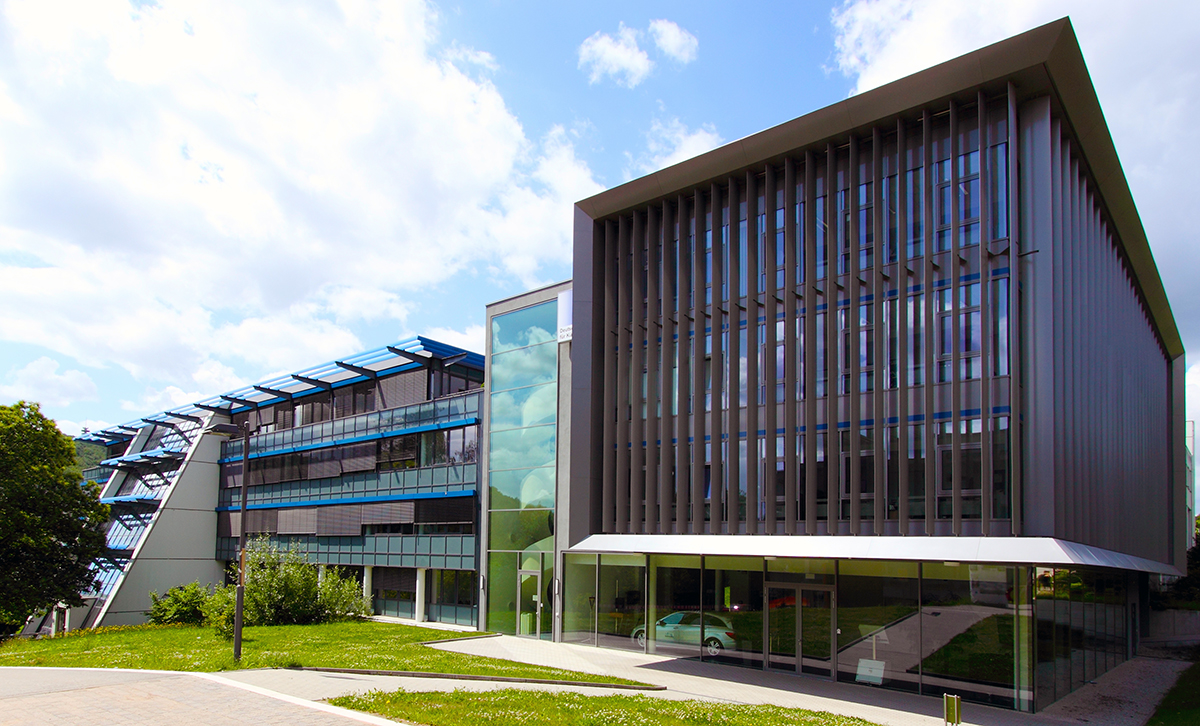
German Research Center For Artificial Intelligence (DFKI)

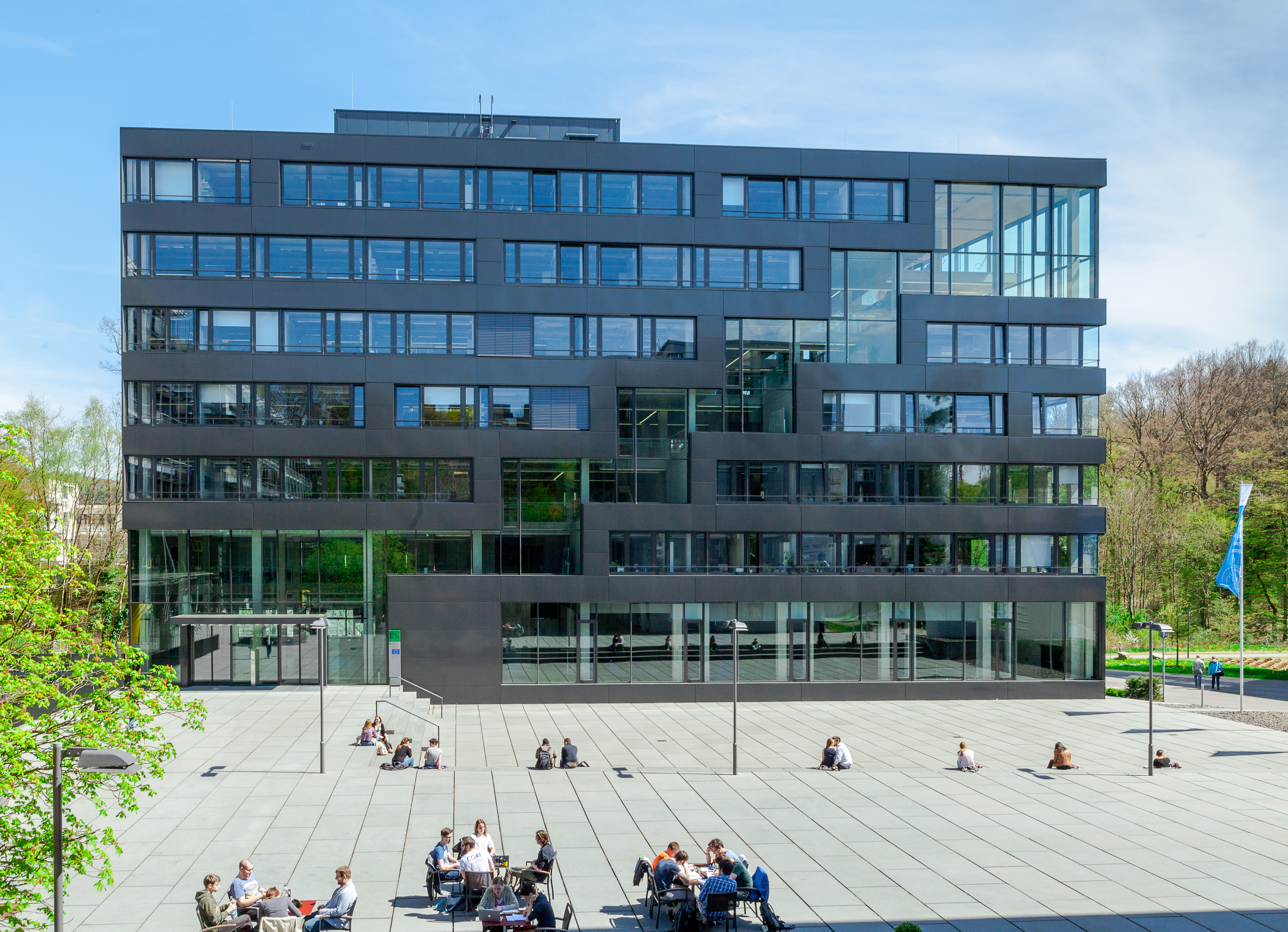
Max Planck Institute for Software Systems (MPI-SWS)

The following research institutions are included in the SIC:

- German Research Center for Artificial Intelligence (1988),
- Leibniz Center for Informatics at Schloss Dagstuhl (1989),
- Max Planck Institute for Informatics (1990),
- Center for Bioinformatics (2000),
- Max Planck Institute for Software Systems (2004),
- CISPA Helmholtz Center for Information Security (2020).

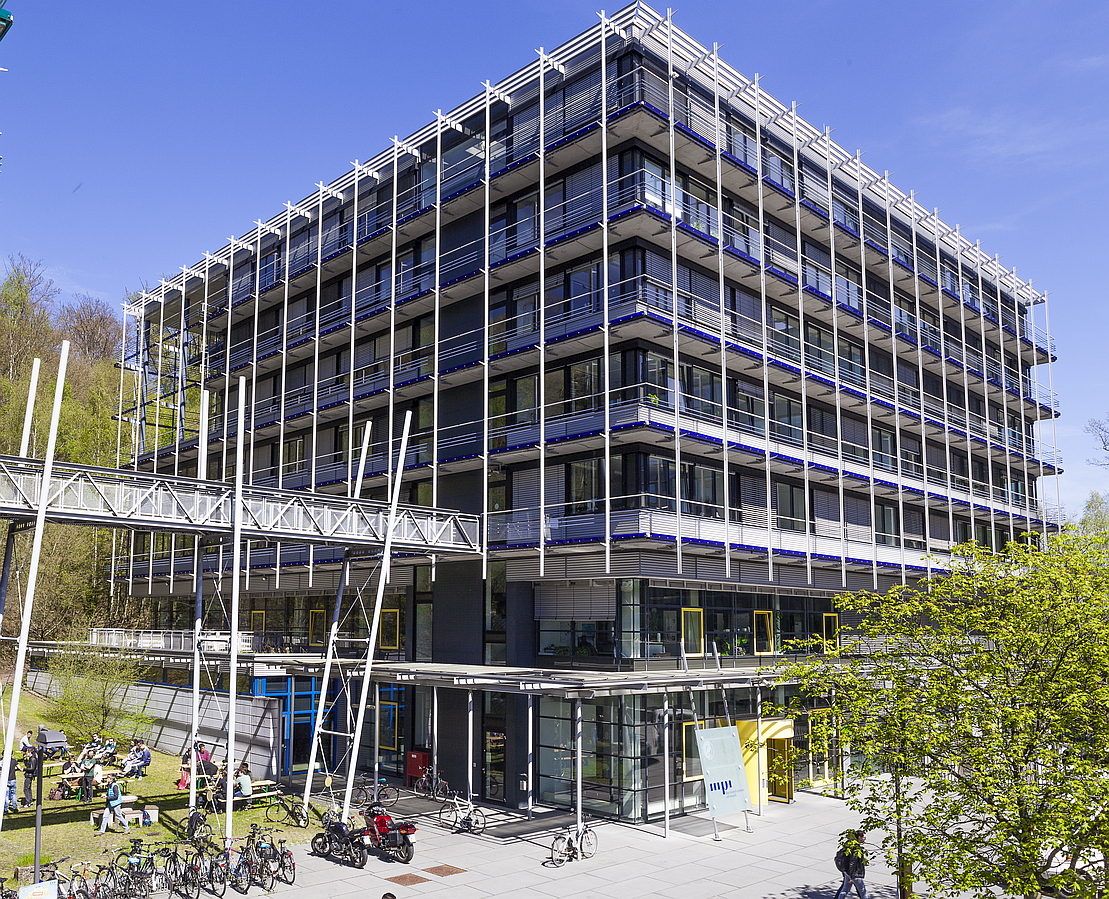
Max Planck Institute for Informatics (MPI-INF)

==== Bachelor's degree programs ====
Bioinformatics, Business Informatics, Computer Science (English), Computer Science (German), Computational Linguistics, Cybersecurity (English), Cybersecurity (German), Data Science and Artificial Intelligence, Embedded Systems (phasing out), Mathematics and Computer Science, Media Informatics.

==== Master's degree programs ====
Bioinformatics, Business Informatics, Computer Science, Cybersecurity, Data Science and Artificial Intelligence, Embedded Systems, Entrepreneurial Cybersecurity (phasing out), Language Science and Technology, Mathematics and Computer Science, Media Informatics, Visual Computing, Language and Communication Technologies.

==== State examination (teaching credential) ====
- Computer Science Teacher Education: Secondary Level I (LS 1), Secondary Level II (LS 1 + 2), teaching at vocational schools (LAB)

==== PhD programs ====
- Saarbrücken Graduate School of Computer Science
  - Max Planck Graduate Center for Computer and Information Science
  - International Max Planck Research School on Trustworthy Computing

=== Industry relations and innovation ===
==== Industry relations ====
The SIC has partnered with companies such as Google, Volkswagen, BMW, Intel, Nvidia, Samsung, IBM, Microsoft, Bosch, Airbus, Adobe, Adidas, Deutsche Post, EADS, and Siemens.

- In 2019, ZF Friedrichshafen AG, a global automotive supplier, partnered with DFKI and CISPA to start a new center for artificial intelligence and cybersecurity, ZF AI and Cybersecurity Center.
- The Federal Office for Information Security (BSI), Germany's federal branch for cybersecurity, has been operating a branch on campus since 2021, primarily focusing on AI system security and safe digitalization.
- VIA Saarbrücken Research Center for Visual Computing Interaction and AI was established on the SIC in 2022 through a partnership between Google and the Max Planck Institute for Informatics. The center focuses on computer graphics, computer vision, human-machine interaction, artificial intelligence and machine learning.
- Between 2009 and 2019, the Intel Visual Computing Institute was located on SIC. The institute's focus was visual computing.

==== Innovation ====
Saarland University participates in the German EXIST initiative, which provides funding and support for scientists establishing startups based on research. In 2023, the university started a specialized initiative called Triathlon, which supports innovation, student entrepreneurship, and technology transfer through services including start-up coaching, financial support, skill workshops, and intellectual property assistance.

== Notable people ==
=== Leibniz Prize winners ===
Leibniz Prize winners, while working at the Saarland University:

- Rolf Müller, biotechnology (2021)
- Joachim Weickert, digital image processing (2010)
- Hans-Peter Seidel, computer graphics (2003)
- Manfred Pinkal, computational linguistics (2000)
- Johannes Buchmann, information theory (1993)
- Michael Veith, inorganic chemistry (1991)
- Herbert Gleiter, material science (1989)
- Günter Hotz, Kurt Mehlhorn and Wolfgang Paul, computer science (1987)

=== Faculty and Alumni ===
- David Bardens (born 1984), physician
- Susanne Albers (born 1965), scientist
- Peter Altmaier (born 1958), politician (CDU)
- Karl-Otto Apel (1922–2017), philosopher
- Hans Hermann Hoppe (born 1949), philosopher and economist
- Peter Bofinger (born 1954), economist
- F. Thomas Bruss (born 1949), mathematician
- Ralf Dahrendorf (1929–2009), politician
- Lars Feld (born 1966), economist
- Jürgen W. Falter (born 1944), political scientist
- Winfried Hassemer (1940–2014), scientist
- Philip Hall (born 1967), British diplomat
- Jürgen Hescheler (born 1959), physician, researcher and university professor
- Werner Jeanrond (born 1955), theologian
- Ursula Kampmann, numismatist
- Alexandra Kertz-Welzel (born 1970), Professor of Music Education at LMU Munich
- Reinhard Klimmt (born 1942), politician (SPD)
- Annegret Kramp-Karrenbauer (born 1962), politician (CDU)
- Christian Graf von Krockow (1927–2002), political scientist and author
- Daniel Kroening, computer scientist
- Oskar Lafontaine (born 1943), politician (The Left)
- Wilfried Loth (born 1948), historian
- Heiko Maas (born 1966), politician (SPD)
- Werner Maihofer (1918–2009), lawyer and politician (FDP)
- Matthias Maurer (born 1980), materials scientist and astronaut
- Bernhard Nebel (born 1956), scientist
- Anke Rehlinger (born 1976), politician (SPD)
- August-Wilhelm Scheer (born 1941), scientist and entrepreneur
- Claus Peter Schnorr (1943–2025), scientist
- Ottmar Schreiner (born 1942), politician (SPD)
- Diana Stöcker (born 1970), politician (CDU)
- Christina Weiss (born 1953), journalist and politician
- Michael Wolffsohn (born 1947), historian
- Johanna Narten (1930–2019), historical linguist and first woman member of the Bavarian Academy of Sciences and Humanities

== See also ==
- BALL
- Europa-Institut of Saarland University
- Hochschule für Musik Saar
- Homburg
