= Jürgen Hescheler =

German physician and stem cell researcher

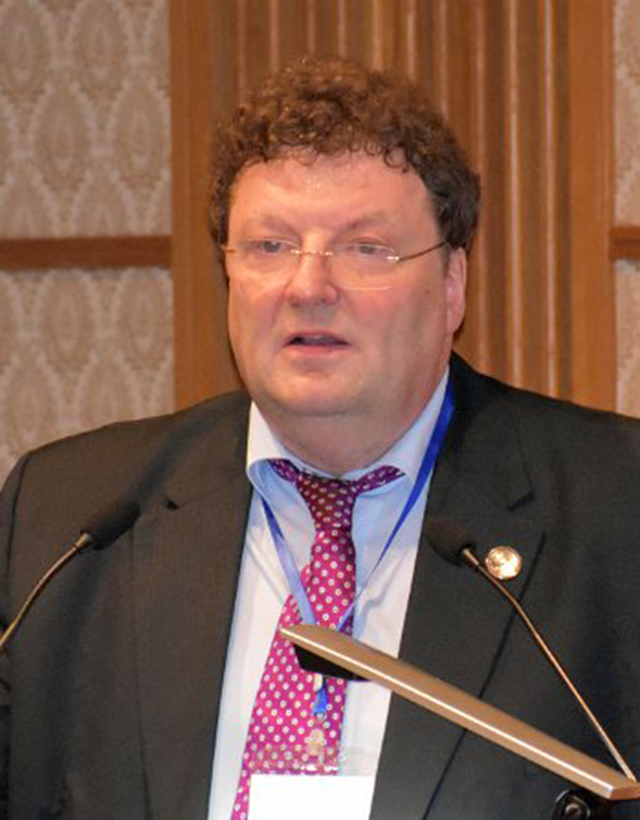
Prof. Jurgen Hescheler, delivering key note lecture in NCRM NICHE, Tokyo, Japan, 2017

Jürgen Karl-Josef Hescheler (born 2 May 1959) is a German physician and stem cell researcher. He is director to the Institute for Neurophysiology and a university professor at the University of Cologne. Hescheler has studied the biology of embryonic stem cells since the late 80's, and his publications have garnered an average total of over 1,000 citations per year since the late 2010's. He became the first researcher to accomplish an electrophysiological characterization of stem cells and was also among the first scientists in Germany obtaining permission to do research on human embryonic stem cells. His team using a novel hanging drop method, pioneered the in vitro culture of mouse embryonic stem cells and their differentiation into cardiomyoscytes. He is the founder and Chairman of the German Society for Stem Cell Research (GSZ) and co-founder of Journal of Stem Cells and Regenerative Medicine (JSRM).
