= Hans-Peter Seidel =

German computer graphics researcher

Hans-Peter Seidel (born 24 April 1958) is a German computer graphics researcher at the Max Planck Institute for Computer Science and Saarland University.

== Education and career ==
Seidel was born in Stuttgart, West Germany. He earned his doctorate degree in mathematics at the University of Tübingen in 1987, under the supervision of Rainer Löwen; his dissertation was entitled "Symmetrische Strukturen und Zentralkollineationen auf topologischen Ebenen". In 1989, still at Tübingen University, he earned a habilitation degree in computer science. Since 1999, he has been a director at the Max Planck Institute for Computer Science and a professor at Saarland University. Prior to his position at Max Planck Institute, he was a member of a faculty at the University of Erlangen from 1992 to 1999.

== Awards ==
In 2003, Seidel was the first computer graphics researcher to win the Gottfried Wilhelm Leibniz Prize and in 2017, the European Association for Computer Graphics had awarded him with the Europhysics Medal "for his outstanding scientific contributions to computer graphics and geometric modelling, for his academic achievements as a scholar and mentor, and for his leadership in developing the Eurographics Association."
