= Sebastian Möller =

German scientist (born 1968)

- Born: 1968 (age 57–58)
- Awards: Geers Foundation Award (1998), Lothar Cremer Prize of the German Acoustical Association (DEGA) (2003), Heisenberg Fellowship (2005), Johann Philipp Reis Award (2009)
- Scientific career
- Fields: Quality and Usability
- Workplaces: Deutsches Forschungszentrum für Künstliche Intelligenz, Technische Universität Berlin

Sebastian Möller (born 1968) is an expert for quality of experience and speech technology.

== Biography ==
Sebastian Möller studied electrical engineering at the universities in Bochum (Germany), Orléans (France) and Bologna (Italy). From 1994 to 2005, he was a scientific researcher and later lecturer at the Institute of Communication Acoustics at Ruhr Universität Bochum specializing in speech transmission, speech technology and communication acoustics, as well as the quality of speech-based systems. Möller earned his habilitation at the Faculty of Electrical Engineering and Information Technology at Ruhr Universität Bochum in 2004 with a book discussing the quality of telephone-based speech dialog systems. He joined Telekom Innovation Laboratories (previously known as Deutsche Telekom Laboratories) in June 2005. In April 2007, he was appointed to a professorship at Technische Universität Berlin, and at Telekom Innovation Laboratories he was the head of the Quality and Usability Lab. From 2015 to 2017, he served as a Vice Dean for Research at the Factulty for Electrical Engineering and Computer Science at Technische Universität Berlin, and from 2017 to 2019 as the Dean of this faculty. He also leads the research department Speech and Language Technology at the German Research Center for Artificial Intelligence, DFKI, as a Scientific Director since 2017. In September 2008, Möller was a visiting fellow at the Marcs Institute (formerly Laboratories), University of Western Sydney in Australia, specializing in the evaluation of avatars. In November 2011, he was Visiting Professor at the Universidad de Granada (Spain), from February to April 2012 and from May to July 2014 Visiting Professor at the Ben Gurion University of the Negev in Be'er Sheva (Israel), in October 2013 Visiting Professor at NTNU in Trondheim (Norway), from 2012 to 2018 he was adjunct professor at the University of Canberra (Australia), and since 2018, he is adjunct professor at the University of Technology Sydney (Australia). His book on "Quality Engineering" was published in 2010.

== Honors and awards ==
- 1998: Geers Foundation Award
- 2003: Lothar Cremer Prize of the German Acoustical Association (DEGA)
- 2005: Heisenberg Fellowship
- 2009: Johann-Philipp-Reis Award
