= Alexander Raake =

German electrical engineering professor (born 1971)

- Born: 1971 (age 54–55); Düsseldorf, Germany
- Education: RWTH Aachen University; Ruhr University Bochum (PhD)
- Awards: Award for outstanding research publications from young ITG scientists (2007); Johann Philipp Reis Award (2011)
- Scientific career
- Fields: Usability, quality of experience
- Workplaces: RWTH Aachen University; Ilmenau University of Technology; Telekom Innovation Laboratories; TU Berlin

Alexander Raake (born 1971 in Düsseldorf, Germany) is a German electrical engineer and academic. He is a full professor at RWTH Aachen University, where he heads the Chair and Institute for Communications Engineering (IENT). Until May 2025, he was a full professor at Ilmenau University of Technology (TU Ilmenau), where he led the Audiovisual Technology Group and served as Director of the Institute for Media Technology and of the Ilmenau Interactive Immersive Technologies Center (I3TC).

== Early life and education ==
Raake studied electrical engineering and physics at RWTH Aachen University and at Télécom ParisTech (ENST) in France. He obtained his Diploma degree in Electrical Engineering from RWTH Aachen University in 1997, and subsequently spent time conducting research at the École polytechnique fédérale de Lausanne (EPFL), Switzerland.

He received his PhD (Dr.-Ing.) from Ruhr University Bochum, Germany, in 2005 with a dissertation on speech quality assessment in Voice over IP (VoIP).

== Academic and professional career ==
After completing a postdoctoral appointment at LIMSI–CNRS in Orsay, France in 2005, Raake joined Telekom Innovation Laboratories (T-Labs), an an-institute of TU Berlin. Between 2005 and 2015, he held several positions at T-Labs, including assistant professor (from 2009) and associate professor (from 2013).

Raake subsequently joined Ilmenau University of Technology in 2015 as Professor of Audiovisual Technology. At TU Ilmenau, he led the Audiovisual Technology Group and served as Director of the Institute for Media Technology and of the Ilmenau Interactive Immersive Technologies Center (I3TC).

In June 2025, he moved to RWTH Aachen University as a full professor and head of the Chair and Institute for Communications Engineering (IENT).

== Entrepreneurship ==
In addition to his academic work, Raake is a co-founder of AVEQ GmbH, a technology company specializing in video streaming performance and quality of experience (QoE) solutions. AVEQ was founded as a spin-off from Ilmenau University of Technology in 2018.

== Research ==
Raake's research focuses on audiovisual and immersive media technology, audiovisual perception and cognition, extended reality (XR), including augmented, virtual and mixed reality (AR/VR/MR) and Social XR, multimedia networks, and methods for assessing quality of experience (QoE) and quality of service (QoS).

He has contributed to several international standardization activities, particularly within the International Telecommunication Union – Telecommunication Standardization Sector (ITU-T) and the Video Quality Experts Group (VQEG). He serves as Co-Rapporteur for ITU-T Study Group 12, Question 14/12, on multimedia quality assessment of packet-based video services, and as Co-Chair of the Intersector Rapporteur Group on Audiovisual Quality Assessment (IRG-AVQA).

== Awards and honors ==
Raake has received several awards for his scientific contributions. He was honored with the Johann Philipp Reis Award in 2011. In 2007, he received the Award of the Information Technology Society (ITG) of VDE for outstanding research publications.
