= Journal of Stem Cells & Regenerative Medicine =

- Discipline: Stem cells, regenerative medicine
- Language: English
- Edited by: Jurgen Hescheler, Kootoorathu M.Cherian, Samuel JK Abraham

Publication details
- History: Since 2006
- Publisher: GN Corporation Co. Ltd. (Japan)
- Frequency: Biannually
- Open access: Yes
- Impact factor: 1.6 (2024)

Standard abbreviations
- ISO 4: J. Stem Cells Regen. Med.

Indexing
- ISSN: 0973-7154
- OCLC no.: 456200182

Links
- Journal homepage; Online access; Archives

The Journal of Stem Cells & Regenerative Medicine is a biannual open-access medical journal. It is the official journal of the German Society for Stem Cell Research and covers research on stem cells and regenerative medicine and related fields. The journal was established by its editors-in-chief Jürgen Hescheler (University of Cologne), Kootoorathu M. Cherian (Frontier Lifeline and Dr.K. M. Cherian Heart Foundation), and Samuel J.K. Abraham (University of Yamanashi). It is abstracted and indexed in the Emerging Sources Citation Index, Scopus, Directory of Open Access Journals, and Embase.

According to the Journal Citation Reports, the journal has a 2024 impact factor of 1.6.

== Types of articles ==
The journal publishes:

- Brief communications and case reports
- Editorials
- Letters to the editor
- News and opinions
- Original articles
- Proceedings of meetings
- Review articles
