= Gerhard Weikum =

German computer scientist

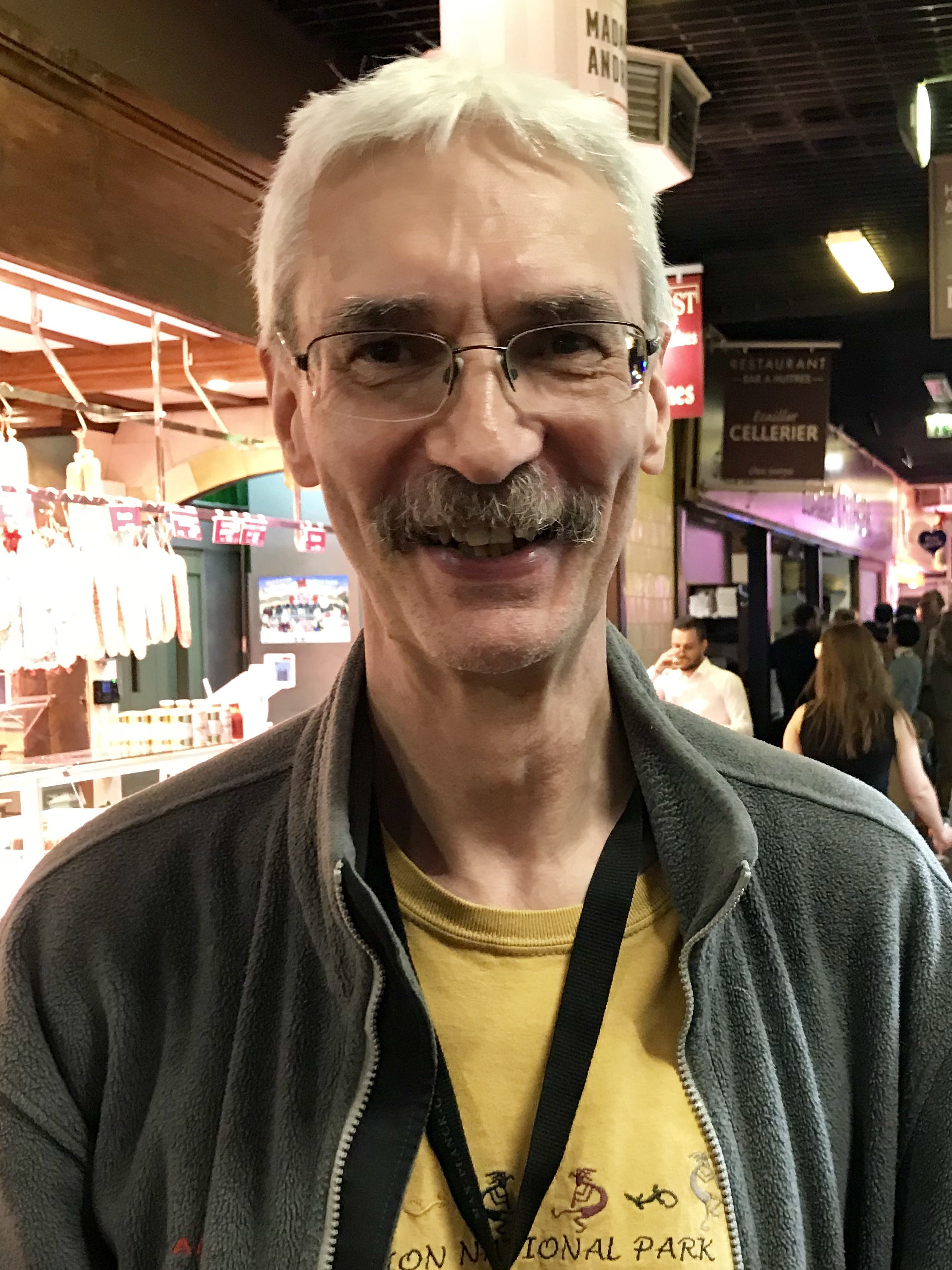
- Gerhard Weikum
- Born: September 28, 1957 (age 69); Frankfurt, Germany
- Education: TU Darmstadt
- Known for: Database systems and Knowledge Graphs
- Awards: Konrad Zuse Medal (2021); E. F. Codd Award (2016); ACM Fellow (2005)
- Scientific career
- Fields: Computer Science
- Workplaces: ETH Zurich; Saarland University; MPI Informatics
- Doctoral advisor: Hans-Jörg Schek

Gerhard Weikum (born September 28, 1957) is a German computer scientist and Research Director at the Max Planck Institute for Informatics in Saarbrücken, Germany, where he is leading the databases and information systems department. His current research interests include transactional and distributed systems, self-tuning database systems, data and text integration, and the automatic construction of knowledge bases. He is one of the creators of the YAGO knowledge base. He is also the Dean of the International Max Planck Research School for Computer Science (IMPRS-CS).

Earlier he held positions at Saarland University in Saarbrücken, Germany, at ETH Zurich, Switzerland, at MCC in Austin, Texas, and he was a visiting senior researcher at Microsoft Research in Redmond, Washington. He received his diploma and doctoral degrees from the TU Darmstadt, Germany.

He acted as the President of the VLDB endowment in 2005 and 2006. The endowment organizes the yearly International Conference on Very Large Databases, a scientific conference for researchers in the area of database research.

In 2005 the Association for Computing Machinery appointed Gerhard Weikum a fellow, one of the highest honors of the ACM. Weikum has been honored for his research in the fields of databases and information systems, in particular for his contributions to improve the reliability and the performance of large-scale, distributed information systems. In 2010 he was elected as a fellow of the Gesellschaft für Informatik and received a Google Focused Research Award. He received the ACM SIGMOD Contributions Award in 2011, an ERC Synergy Grant in 2013, and the ACM SIGMOD Edgar F. Codd Innovations Award in 2016.

In 2018 he became a member of the German Academy of Sciences Leopoldina.
