= Anja Feldmann =

German computer scientist

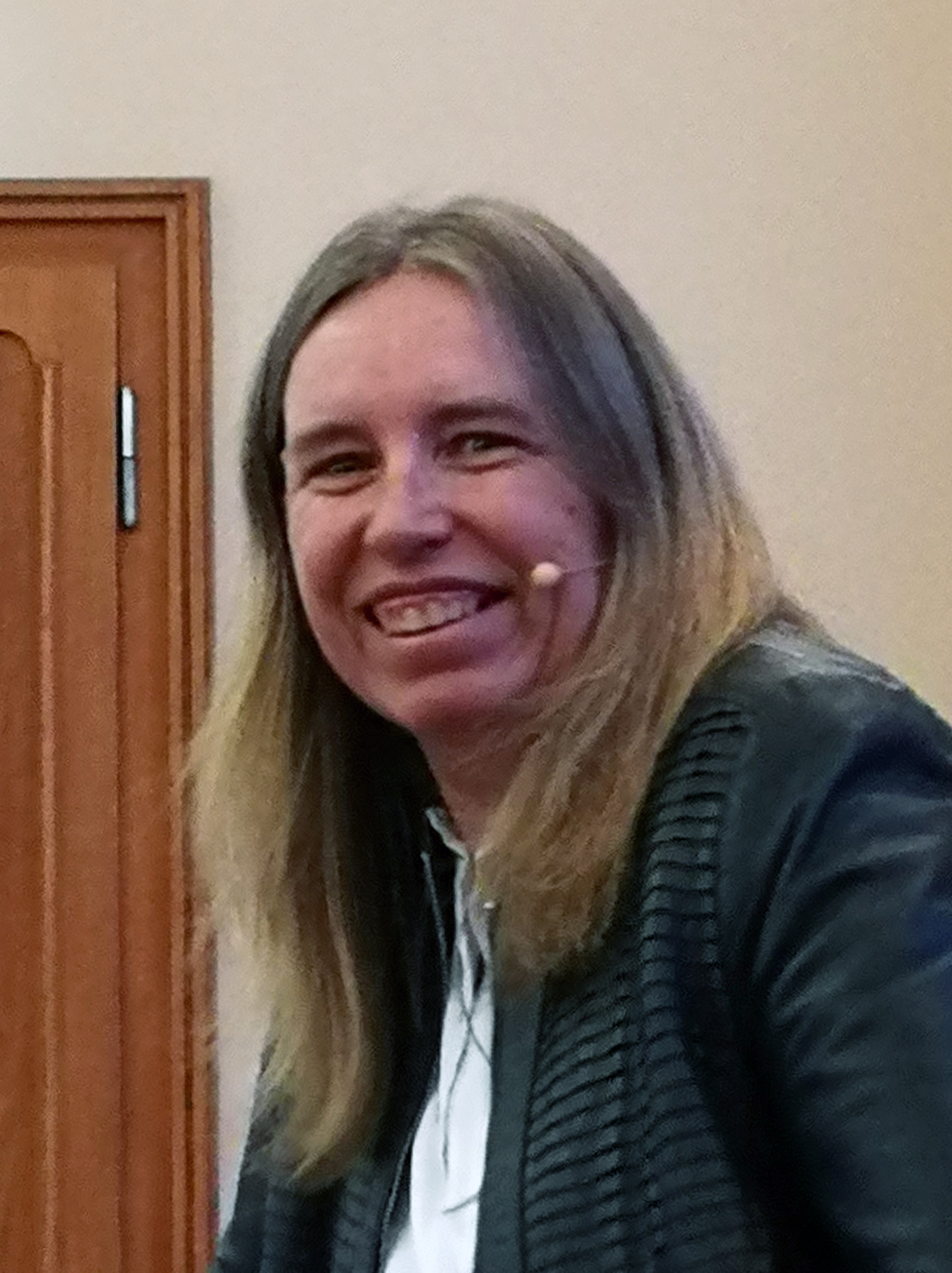
- Feldmann in 2018
- Born: 8 March 1966 (age 60); Bielefeld, West Germany
- Awards: Member of Leopoldina (2009); Gottfried Wilhelm Leibniz Prize (2011); Berlin Science Award (2011); IEEE Koji Kobayashi Computers and Communications Award (2024)
- Scientific career
- Fields: Computer Science
- Workplaces: Telekom Innovation Laboratories, Technische Universität Berlin, Germany

Anja Feldmann (born 8 March 1966 in Bielefeld) is a German computer scientist.

== Education and career ==
Feldmann studied computer science at Paderborn University and received her degree in 1990. She continued her studies at Carnegie Mellon University, where she earned her M.Sc. in 1991 and her Ph.D. in 1995. Following four years of postdoctoral work at AT&T Labs Research, she held research positions at Saarland University and the Technical University of Munich.

In 2006, she was appointed as professor of Internet Network Architectures for the Telekom Innovation Laboratories at the Technische Universität Berlin. As professor her research focused on Internet measurement, Teletraffic engineering, traffic characterization and debugging network performance issues. She has also conducted research into intrusion detection and network architecture. She has served on more than 50 committees and was the co-chair of SIGCOMM. Alex Snoeren said that she "was instrumental in the establishment of a rigorous science of Internet measurement. Among her many contributions, she is perhaps best known for her work in traffic characterization and engineering.”

Between 2009 and 2013, Feldmann was Dean of the Computer Science and Electrical Engineering department at the Technische Universität Berlin, Germany. From 2012 until early 2018, Feldmann sat on the employer side of the supervisory board of SAP. In October 2017, she was appointed as director of the Max Planck Institute for Informatics, her focus will be on researching the Internet architecture.

== Other activities ==
- Karlsruhe Institute of Technology (KIT), Member of the Supervisory Board

== Honors and awards ==
- 2009: Member of Leopoldina
- 2011: Gottfried Wilhelm Leibniz Prize
- 2011: Berlin Science Award
- 2023: ACM Fellow
