= Max Planck Institute for Informatics =

Research institute in computer science

Coordinates: 49°15′28″N 7°2′44″E

- Logo
- Abbreviation: MPI-INF or MPII
- Formation: 1988; 38 years ago
- Type: Research institute
- Headquarters: Saarbrücken, Saarland, Germany
- Website: www.mpi-inf.mpg.de

The Max Planck Institute for Informatics (German: Max-Planck-Institut für Informatik, abbreviated MPI-INF or MPII) is a research institute in computer science with a focus on algorithms and their applications in a broad sense. It hosts fundamental research (algorithms and complexity, programming logics) as well a research for various application domains (computer graphics, geometric computation, constraint solving, computational biology).

Founded November 1988 by the Max Planck Society, Germany's largest publicly funded body for foundation research, MPII is located on the campus of Saarland University.

== Research departments ==
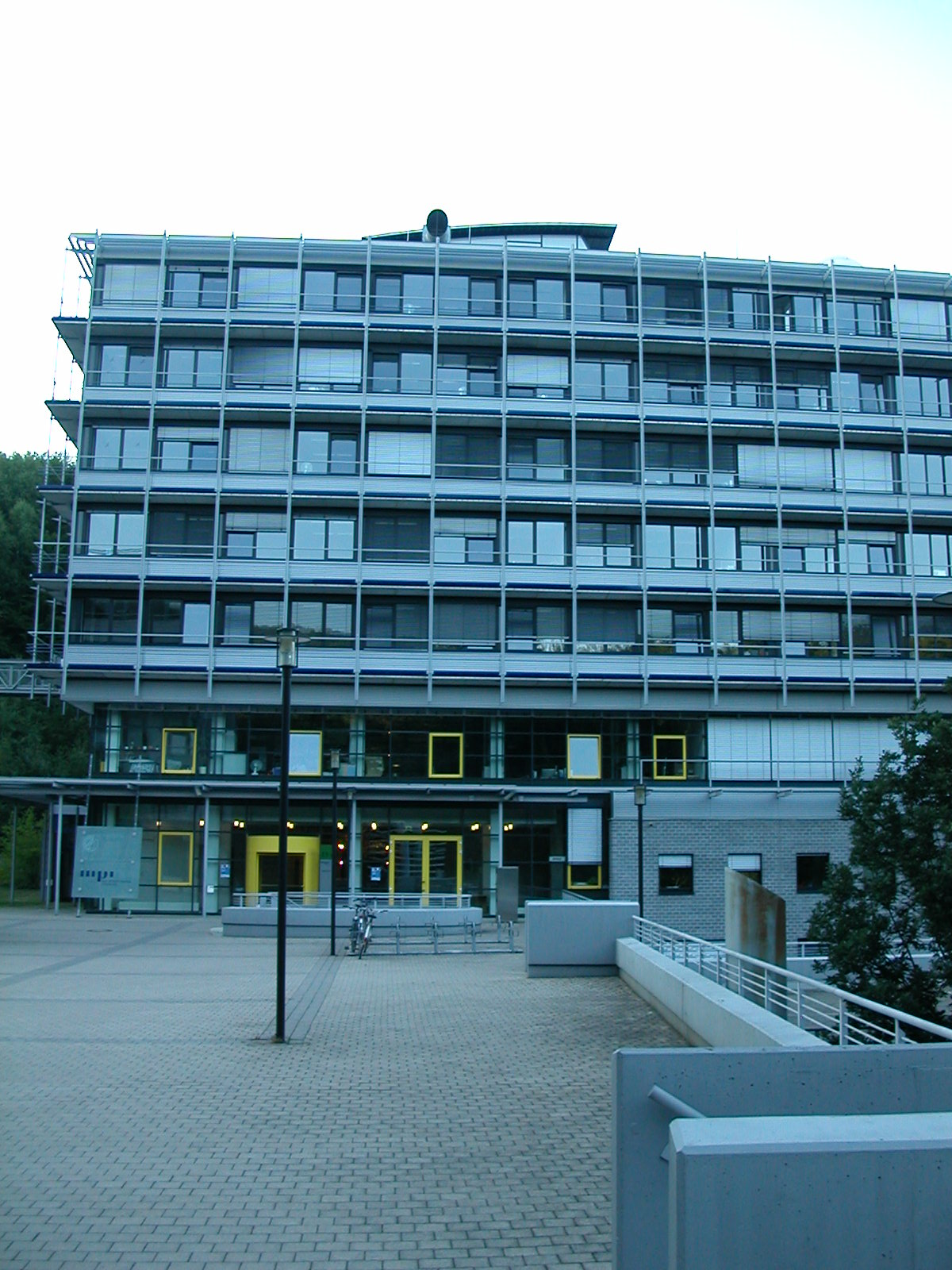
Max Planck Institute for Informatics at Saarbrücken

The institute promotes six departments and three independent research groups on its website. The six departments are Algorithms and Complexity; Computer Vision and Machine Learning; Internet Architecture; Computer Graphics; Databases and Information Systems; and Visual Computing and Artificial Intelligence. The three research groups are Automation of Logic; Network and Cloud Systems; and Multimodal Language Processing.

The institute, along with the Max Planck Institute for Software Systems (MPI-SWS), the German Research Centre for Artificial Intelligence (DFKI) and the entire Computer Science department of Saarland University, is involved in the Internationales Begegnungs- und Forschungszentrum für Informatik.

The International Max Planck Research School for Computer Science (IMPRS-CS) is the graduate school of the MPII and the MPI-SWS. It was founded in 2000 and offers a fully funded PhD-Program in cooperation with Saarland University. Dean is Gerhard Weikum.

== Awards and recognition ==
Institute faculty members have received numerous awards, including The Leibniz Prize awarded to Kurt Mehlhorn (1987), Hans-Peter Seidel (2003), and Anja Feldmann (2011); the Konrad Zuse Medal granted to Kurt Mehlhorn (1995), Thomas Lengauer (2003), and Gerhard Weikum (2021); and the Karl Heinz Beckurts-Preis given to Kurt Mehlhorn (1994) and Christian Theobalt (2017); as well as ACM Fellowships given to Kurt Mehlhorn (1999), Gerhard Weikum (2006), Thomas Lengauer (2021), and Bernt Schiele (2021).

== See also ==
- Max Planck Institute for Software Systems
- YAGO (database) (developed at the Max Planck Institute for Computer Science)
