= Gesche Joost =

German professor specializing in design research

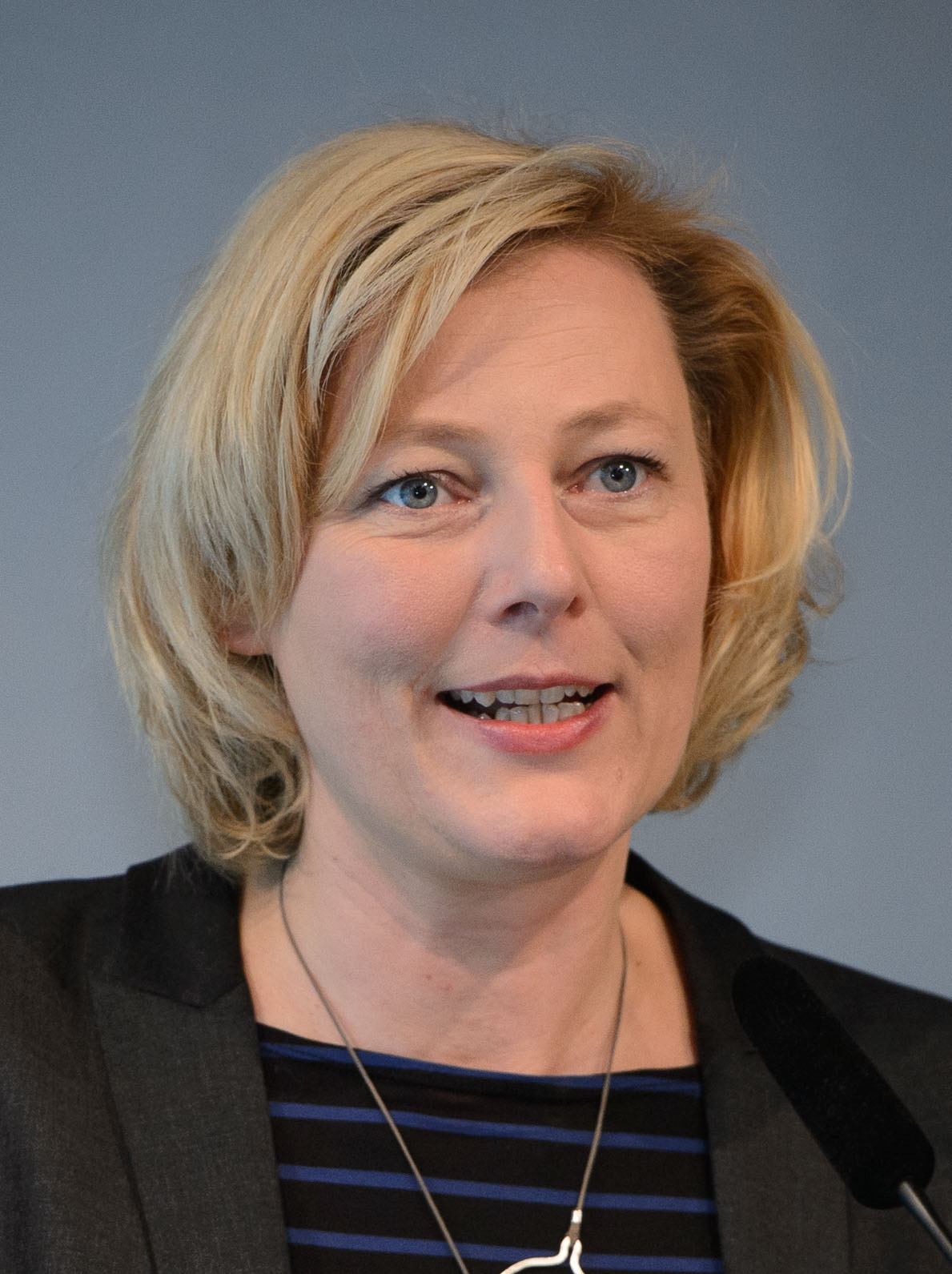
- Born: 1974 (age 51–52); Kiel, West Germany
- Awards: 100 masterminds of tomorrow (2006) The 100 most important young Germans (2006) Science Award of the Governing Mayor of Berlin for Young Researchers (2008)
- Scientific career
- Fields: Design research
- Workplaces: Telekom Innovation Laboratories; Design Research Lab

Gesche Joost (born 1974) is a German design researcher.

== Career ==
Since 2011, Joost has been a professor at the Berlin University of the Arts specializing in design research, and since 2005, she has been the head of the Design Research Lab at Telekom Innovation Laboratories (also known as T-Labs). Joost focuses her research on human-computer interaction, aspects of gender and diversity in communications technology, social sustainability in design, as well as design theory and research.

In 2002, Joost was a founding board member of DGTF (the German Society for Design Theory and Research), which she has also chaired since 2008.

During the winter semester 2007/2008 Joost was a visiting professor at the University of Applied Sciences in Hildesheim (HAWK) for Gender & Design. From 2008 to 2010, she held an assistant professorship at TU Berlin for Interaction Design & Media. She directs several research projects at T-Labs, for example on tactile human-computer interaction. Within the scope of the Generation 50+ project, she participated in the development of the DECT telephone Sinus A 201 (funded by Deutsche Telekom) and received the iF product design award in 2010.

From 2006, Joost served as personal adviser to Germany's former finance minister Peer Steinbrück. In the negotiations to form a Grand Coalition of Chancellor Angela Merkel's Christian Democrats (CDU together with the Bavarian CSU) and the SPD following the 2013 German elections, she was part of the SPD delegation in the working group on digital policy, led by Dorothee Bär and Brigitte Zypries.

== Criticism ==
In 2013, questioned Joost's independence in research and teaching on the basis of its close ties with Deutsche Telekom, citing, among others, objections by Pirate Party politician Ralf Engelhardt and lawyer Jörg Heidrich.

In 2018, Der Spiegel and the ARD magazine "Report Mainz" reported on Joost's voluntary work on the Calliope project, which was compensated by the Federal Ministry of Education and Research for 50,000 euros per year.

== Other activities ==
=== Corporate boards ===
- SAP SE, Member of the supervisory board (since 2015)
- Volkswagen, Member of the Sustainability Council (since 2016)
- CeBIT, Member of the CeBIT Innovation Award Jury

=== Non-profit organizations ===
- Deutsche Telekom Stiftung, Member of the Board of Trustees
- Deutschland sicher im Netz (DSIN), Member of the Advisory Board
- German Society for Design Theory and Research (DGTF), Chairwoman
- Evangelical Church in Germany (EKD), Member of the Synod
- Goethe-Institut, Member of the General Meeting
- Natural History Museum, Berlin, Member of the Scientific Advisory Board
- German National Academic Foundation, Member of the Executive Board
- Technologiestiftung Berlin, Member of the Board
- Center for Art and Media Karlsruhe (ZKM), Member of the Board of Trustees
- Federal Ministry of Justice and Consumer Protection (BMJV), Member of the Expert Advisory Board on Consumer Protection Issues (since 2014)
- D64, Member of the Advisory Board

== Honors and wards ==
- 2006: 100 masterminds of tomorrow
- 2006: The 100 most important young Germans
- 2008: Science Award of the Governing Mayor of Berlin for Young Researchers

== Publications ==
Joost's many publications include Bild-Sprache. Die audio-visuelle Rhetorik des Films (2008, ISBN 978-3-89942-923-7) as well as Design als Rhetorik (2008, ISBN 978-3-7643-8345-9).
