= Rolf Drechsler =

German electrical engineer

Rolf Drechsler is an electrical engineer at the University of Bremen, Germany. He was named a Fellow of the Institute of Electrical and Electronics Engineers (IEEE) in 2015 for his contributions in testing and verification of electronic circuits and systems. He was named as an ACM Fellow in 2023.
