= Laboratoire d'informatique pour la mécanique et les sciences de l'ingénieur =

French research laboratory at CNRS

Coordinates: 48°42′27″N 2°10′34″E

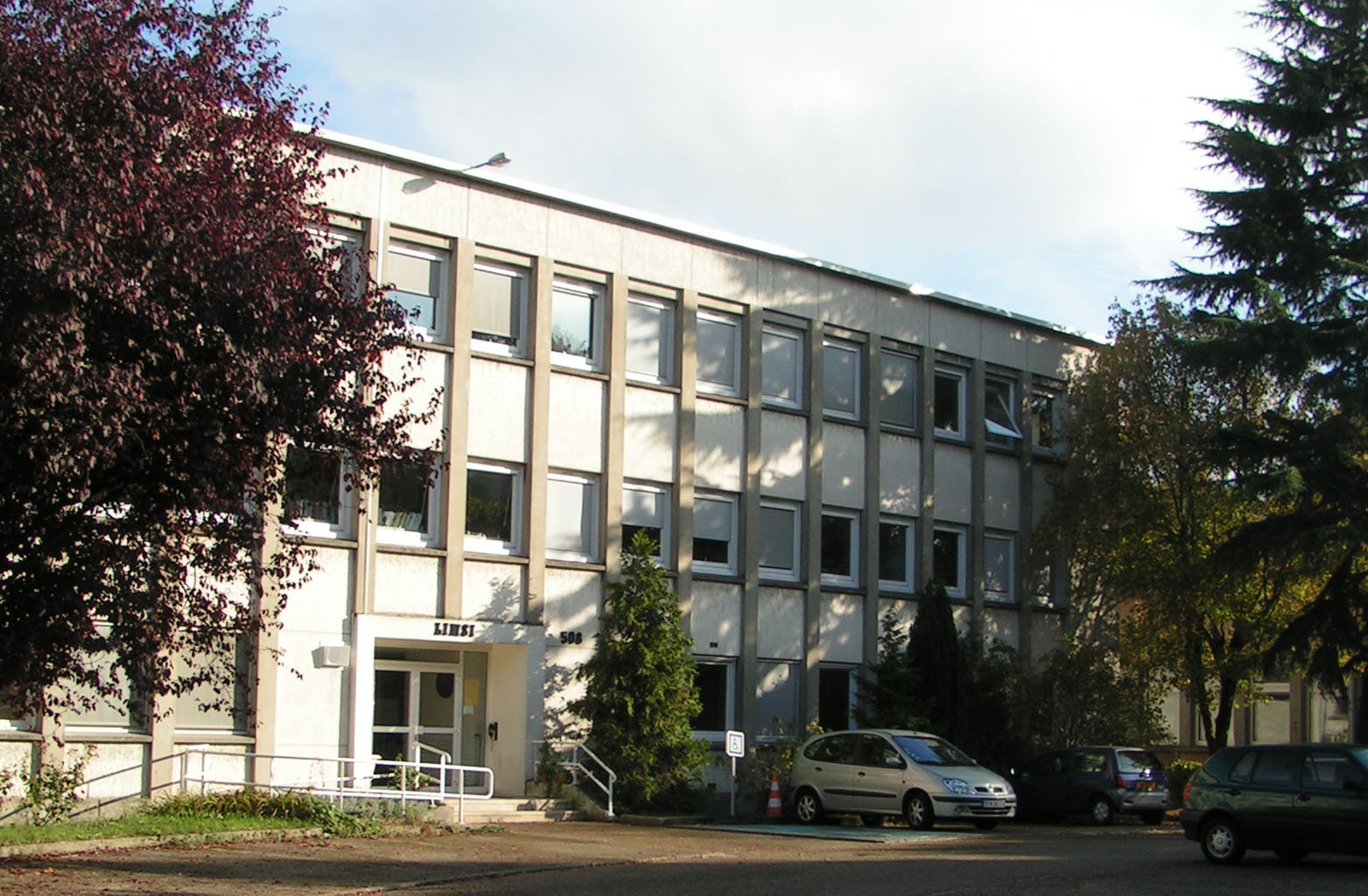
LIMSI's building.

The Computer Science Laboratory for Mechanics and Engineering Sciences (LIMSI) was a CNRS pluri-disciplinary science laboratory in Orsay, France.

LIMSI academics and scholars come primarily from the Engineering and Information Sciences fields, but also from Cognitive Science and Linguistics. LIMSI is associated with the Paris-Sud University. LIMSI also collaborates with other universities and engineering schools within the University Paris-Saclay.

== History ==
LIMSI was created in 1972 under the leadership of Lucien Malavard, with an initial focus on numerical fluid mechanics, acoustics, and signal processing. Its research themes have progressively been expanded to Speech and Image Processing, then to a growing number of themes related to human-computer communication and interaction on the one hand; to thermics and energetics on the other hand.

In January 2021, LIMSI was merged with the Laboratory for Research in Computer Science (LRI) into the new Interdisciplinary Laboratory for Numerical Sciences.

== Research themes ==
LIMSI research is organized in four main themes, spanning the activities of nine research groups:

Fluid Mechanics remains one of LIMSI's main research areas, with an expertise in the development of advanced numerical methodologies associated to experiments in academic configurations: the AERO and ETCM groups both contribute activities related to large-scale numerical simulations, to uncertainty quantification, to the characterization of fluid dynamics (instabilities, turbulence), to the control of flows, and to multiphysic couplings;

The Energetics and study of Mass and Heat Transfer theme carries out fundamental research aimed at a better understanding of transfer phenomena in convection and radiation, in multiphasic and oscillating conditions, and at extremely low temperatures. The ETCM and TSF groups also study the analysis of large thermic systems with application to housing and solar energy.

The Natural Language Processing applied to spoken, written, and signed language is another main research theme at LIMSI. Three groups, TLP, ILES and AA contribute to a wide spectrum of activities ranging from acoustic signal processing, automatic speech recognition and synthesis, to semantic modeling and fine-grained question answering. It also includes multimedia indexing, machine translation, the analysis and generation of emotions in speech and text, and information extraction;

The research in Human-Machine Interaction theme aims at a deeper understanding and modeling of interactions between humans and artificial systems in various contexts, and along various modalities. Four research teams are concerned: AMI focuses mostly on tangible, haptic, gestural and ambient interactions, whereas CPU is more focused on verbal and non-verbal interactions with virtual agents; interactions in virtual and augmented reality environments are studied primarily in the AMI, VENISE and AA research groups.

Many research groups share similar or related interests and application domains; this is especially the case for collaborative research projects at the frontier between Science and Arts. VIDA is a transverse action with the mission to coordinate LIMSI's activities in this domain, as well as to organize events, for instance under the umbrella of the Diagonale Paris-Saclay.
