= Peter Druschel =

German computer scientist

- Education: University of Arizona (Ph.D., 1994); Munich University of Applied Sciences (Dipl.-Ing. (FH), 1986)
- Known for: Pastry DHT; Flash web server; Fast buffers (fbufs); Resource containers
- Awards: SIGOPS Mark Weiser Award (2008); EuroSys Lifetime Achievement Award (2017); Alfred P. Sloan Fellowship (2000); NSF CAREER Award (1995)
- Scientific career
- Fields: Computer Science
- Workplaces: Max Planck Institute for Software Systems; Rice University
- Thesis: Operating System Support for High-Speed Networking
- Doctoral advisor: Larry Peterson
- Website: https://people.mpi-sws.org/~druschel/

Peter Druschel (born 22 April 1959 in Bad Reichenhall) is a German computer scientist and the founding director of the Max Planck Institute for Software Systems in Saarbrücken.

== Education and career ==
Druschel studied electrical engineering, specializing in data technology, at the Munich University of Applied Sciences and completed his studies as a graduate engineer. He graduated in 1994 from the University of Arizona under Larry L. Peterson. In the same year, he became assistant professor of computer science at Rice University. In 2000, he became an associate professor, followed by a full professorship in 2002.

In August 2005, he started his work at the Saarbrücken Max Planck Institute for Software Systems as the founding director. Druschel specializes in distributed systems such as peer-to-peer networks, security, and operating systems. Along with Ant Rowstron, Druschel developed the Pastry distributed hash table technique at Microsoft. In 2008, Druschel was elected a member of the German National Academy of Sciences Leopoldina. In the same year, he was accepted as a full member of the Academia Europaea. He is also a recipient of the SIGOPS Mark Weiser Award.
