= German Society for Stem Cell Research =

German Research Organization

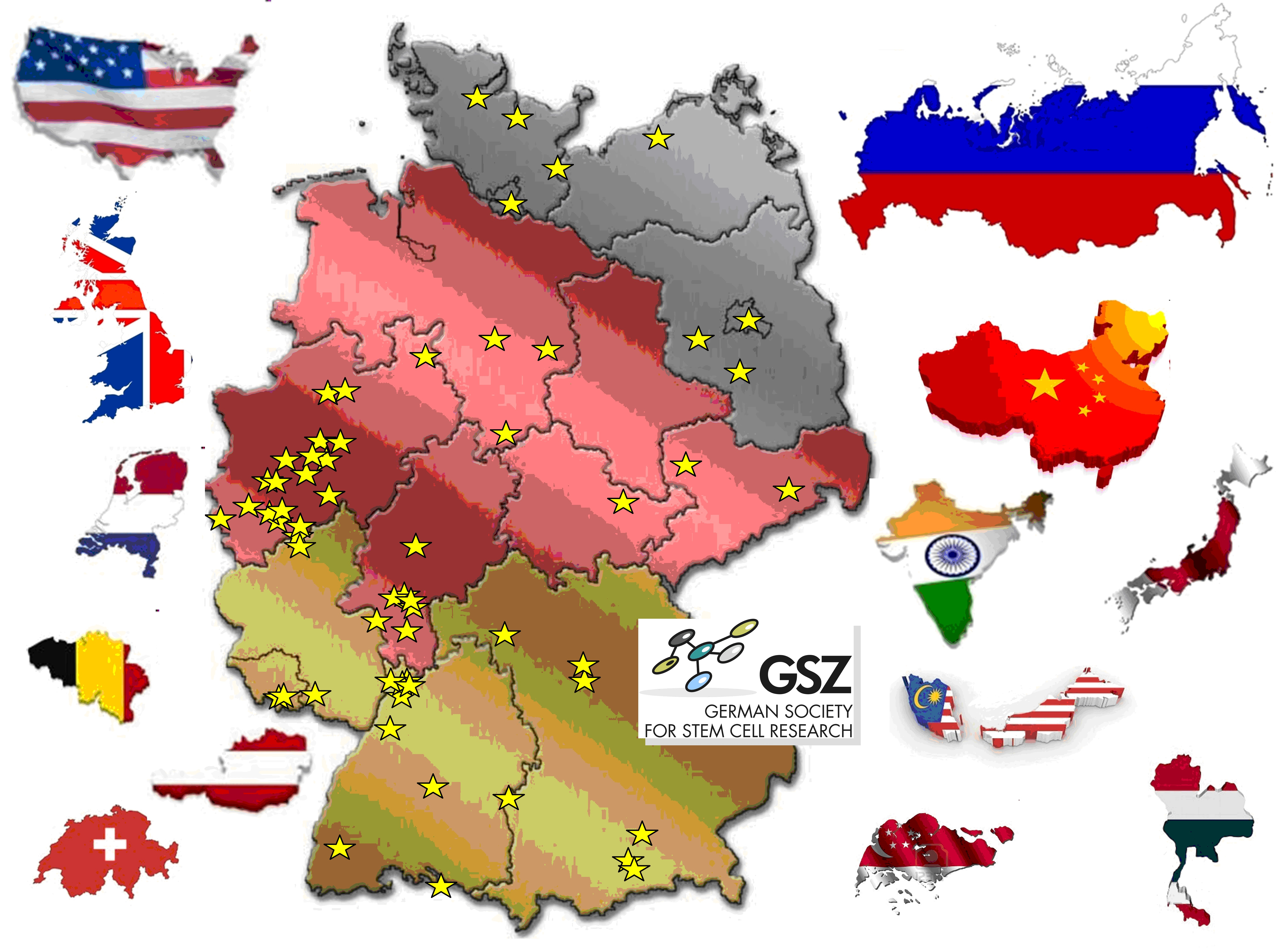

The German Society for Stem Cell Research (Deutsche Gesellschaft für Stammzellforschung or GSZ), established in 2003 by Juergen Hescheler, brings scientists from around Germany together and has an emphasis on basic research in stem cell biology. The main purpose of the society is to promote stem cell research. In order to achieve this goal the society promotes the stem cell research in basic research and in academic teaching by allocating available funds to support training programs, to organize seminars and conferences, as well as instigating the exchange of students and scientists on national and international level for collaborative projects and resulting publications. The German Society for Stem Cell Research aims at establishing a network of scientists in stem cell research nationwide and eventually offering a platform to provide competent and independent counsel for all questions related to stem cell research.

== History ==
In 2003 scientists from around Germany initiated the establishment of the German Society for Stem Cell Research with emphasis on basic research in stem cell biology. The society is a non-profit organisation, financially and politically autonomous, and is registered with the district court Cologne under the number VR 14639 since November 4, 2004. Juergen Hescheler is the chairman of the organisation.

== Objectives ==
The main purpose of the society is to promote stem cell research. In order to achieve this goal the society will promote the stem cell research in basic research and in academic teaching by allocating available funds to support training programs, to organize seminars and conferences, as well as instigating the exchange of students and scientists on the national and international level for collaborative projects and resulting publications.

The German Society for Stem Cell Research aims at establishing a network of scientists in stem cell research nationwide, and eventually bringing them under a single platform and making a competent and independent counsel for all questions related to stem cell research.

The Journal of Stem Cells & Regenerative Medicine is the official journal of the society.
