= List of mergers and acquisitions by Amazon =

Amazon logo

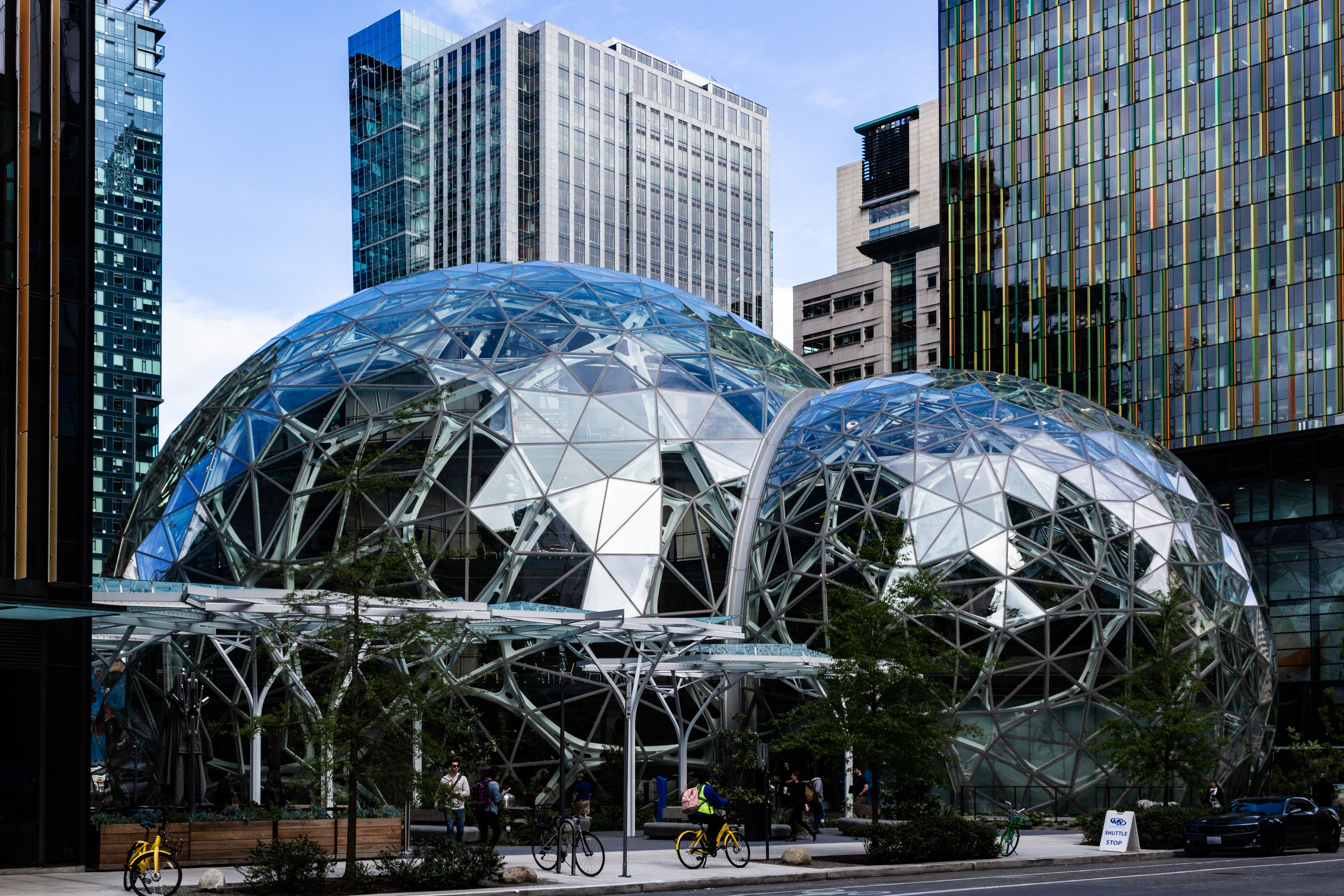
The Amazon Spheres, part of the Amazon headquarters campus in Seattle

Amazon.com, Inc. is an American conglomerate headquartered in Seattle, Washington. Founded by Jeff Bezos on July 5, 1994, as an online bookstore, Amazon went public after an initial public offering on May 15, 1997, during the midst of the dot-com bubble. The funds gained from the IPO allowed Amazon to grow quickly, making its first three acquisitions on April 27, 1998, less than a year after the company had gone public.

After the dot-com bubble burst on March 11, 2000, several companies that Amazon had invested in went bankrupt, with Amazon's stock price itself sinking to record lows. Despite Amazon's survival, the company made very few investments for the next several years, only acquiring two companies between 2000 and 2004. The company returned to making multiple acquisitions per year in 2005, focusing on acquiring digital retailers and media websites. Starting in 2011, Amazon began shifting its focus to buying technology startups to develop and improve Amazon Echo and grow its Amazon Web Services division.

Amazon has diversified its acquisition portfolio into several market sectors, with its largest acquisition being the purchase of the grocery store chain Whole Foods Market for $13.7 billion on June 16, 2017.

== Acquisitions ==
Number	Company	Country	Acquired on	Acquired for (USD)	Adjusted for Inflation (USD)	Used as or integrated with	References
1	Bookpages	United Kingdom	April 27, 1998	55,000,000	109,000,000	Amazon UK	
2	Telebook	Germany	April 27, 1998	55,000,000 stock payment	109,000,000 stock payment	Amazon Germany	
3	IMDb	United Kingdom	April 27, 1998	55,000,000	109,000,000	IMDb	
4	Junglee	United States	August 4, 1998	250,000,000	494,000,000		
5	PlanetAll	United States	August 4, 1998	280,000,000	553,000,000		
6	LiveBid.com	United States	April 12, 1999	300,000,000	580,000,000		
7	Accept.com	United States	April 27, 1999	101,700,000	195,000,000		
8	Alexa Internet	United States	April 27, 1999	250,000,000	483,000,000	Alexa Internet	
9	e-Niche Incorporated	United States	April 27, 1999	—	—		
10	Convergence Corporation	United States	October 4, 1999	23,000,000	44,000,000		
11	Tool Crib of the North (Online and Catalog Sales Division)	United States	November 9, 1999	—	—		
12	Back to Basics Toys	United States	November 30, 1999	—	—		
13	Leep Technology Inc.	United States	December 31, 1999	—	—		
14	MindCorps Incorporated	United States	1999	—	—		
15	Egghead Software	United States	December 5, 2001	6,100,000	11,000,000		
16	OurHouse.com	United States	December 2001	—	—		
17	Joyo.com	China	August 19, 2004	75,000,000	128,000,000	Amazon China	
18	BookSurge	United States	April 4, 2005	—	—	CreateSpace	
19	Mobipocket	France	April 21, 2005	—	—	Mobipocket	
20	CustomFlix	United States	July 6, 2005	—	—	CreateSpace	
21	smallparts.com	United States	2005	—	—	Amazon Business	
22	Shopbop	United States	February 27, 2006	—	—	Shopbop	
23	TextPayMe	United States	October 1, 2006	3,000,000	5,000,000	Amazon Payments	
24	Digital Photography Review	United Kingdom	May 14, 2007	—	—	Digital Photography Review	
25	Brilliance Audio	United States	May 23, 2007	—	—	Brilliance Audio	
26	Withoutabox	United States	January 16, 2008	—	—		
27	Audible	United States	January 28, 2008	300,000,000	449,000,000	Audible	
28	Fabric.com	United States	June 25, 2008	—	—	Fabric.com	
29	AbeBooks	Canada	August 1, 2008	—	—	AbeBooks	
30	Shelfari	United States	August 26, 2008	—	—	Goodreads	
31	Reflexive Entertainment	United States	October 21, 2008	—	—	Reflexive Entertainment	
32	Box Office Mojo	United States	December 17, 2008	—	—	Box Office Mojo	
33	Lexcycle	United States	April 27, 2009	—	—	Amazon Kindle	
34	SnapTell	United States	June 18, 2009	—	—		
35	Zappos	United States	November 2, 2009	1,200,000,000	1.801×10^{9}	Zappos	
36	Touchco	United States	February 3, 2010	—	—	Amazon Kindle	
37	Woot	United States	July 2, 2010	110,000,000	162,000,000	Woot	
38	Amie Street	United States	September 8, 2010	—	—	Songza	
39	BuyVIP	Spain	October 4, 2010	100,000,000	148,000,000	BuyVIP	
40	Quidsi	United States	November 8, 2010	545,000,000	805,000,000	Amazon Prime Now/Amazon Fresh	
41	Toby Press	United States	November 18, 2010	—	—		
42	LoveFilm	United Kingdom	January 20, 2011	312,000,000	447,000,000	Amazon Prime Video	
43	The Book Depository	United Kingdom	July 4, 2011	—	—	Book Depository	
44	Pushbutton	United Kingdom	July 28, 2011	—	—		
45	Yap	United States	September 2011	—	—	Amazon Echo	
46	Double Helix Games	United States	September 5, 2011	—	—	Double Helix Games	
47	Teachstreet	United States	February 2, 2012	—	—		
48	Kiva Systems	United States	March 19, 2012	775,000,000	1.087×10^{9}	Amazon Robotics	
49	Evi	United Kingdom	April 17, 2012	26,000,000	36,000,000	Amazon Echo	
50	Avalon Books	United States	April 17, 2012	—	—	Amazon Publishing	
51	UpNext	United States	July 2, 2012	—	—	UpNext	
52	IVONA Software	Poland	January 24, 2013	—	—	Amazon Echo, Amazon Polly	
53	Goodreads	United States	March 28, 2013	—	—	Goodreads	
54	Liquavista	Netherlands	May 13, 2013	—	—	Amazon Kindle	
55	TenMarks Education, Inc.	United States	October 10, 2013	—	—	TenMarks Education, Inc.	
56	ComiXology	United States	April 10, 2014	—	—	ComiXology	
57	Amiato	United States	May 2014	—	—	Amazon Web Services	
58	Twitch Interactive	United States	August 25, 2014	970,000,000	1.319×10^{9}	Twitch Interactive	
59	Rooftop Media	United States	August 25, 2014	—	—	Audible	
60	GoodGame	United States	December 9, 2014	—	—	Twitch Interactive	
61	Annapurna Labs	Israel	January 22, 2015	350,000,000	475,000,000	Annapurna Labs	
62	2lemetry	United States	March 12, 2015	—	—	Amazon Web Services	
63	Shoefitr	United States	April 10, 2015	—	—		
64	ClusterK	United States	April 29, 2015	35,000,000	48,000,000	Amazon Web Services	
65	AppThwack	United States	July 14, 2015	—	—	Amazon Web Services	
66	Elemental Technologies	United States	September 3, 2015	500,000,000	679,000,000	AWS Elemental	
67	Safaba Translation Systems	United States	September 25, 2015	—	—	Amazon Web Services	
68	Biba Systems	United States	September 2015	—	—	Amazon Chime	
69	Orbeus	United States	December 1, 2015	—	—	Amazon Web Services	
70	Colis Privé	France	January 11, 2016	—	—		
71	NICE	Italy	February 12, 2016	—	—	Amazon Web Services	
72	Emvantage Payments	India	February 16, 2016	—	—	Amazon Web Services	
73	Cloud9 IDE	United States	July 14, 2016	—	—	Amazon Web Services	
74	Curse, Inc.	United States	August 16, 2016	—	—	Curse LLC	
75	Westland	India	October 28, 2016	—	—	Westland	
76	Partpic	United States	November 2, 2016	—	—		
77	harvest.ai	United States	January 9, 2017	20,000,000	26,000,000	Amazon Web Services	
78	Thinkbox Software	United States	March 6, 2017	—	—	Amazon Web Services	
79	Do.com	United States	March 8, 2017	—	—	Amazon Web Services	
80	Whole Foods Market	United States	June 16, 2017	13,700,000,000	1.7995×10^{10}	Whole Foods Market	
81	Souq.com	United Arab Emirates	July 3, 2017	580,000,000	762,000,000	Souq.com	
82	Graphiq	United States	July 20, 2017	50,000,000	66,000,000	Amazon Echo	
83	GameSparks	United Kingdom	July 28, 2017	10,000,000	13,000,000	GameSparks	
84	Wing.ae	United Arab Emirates	September 6, 2017	0 (subsidiary of souq.com)	0 (subsidiary of souq.com)	Souq.com	
85	Body Labs	United States	October 3, 2017	60,000,000	79,000,000	Body Labs	
86	Goo Technologies	United States	November 28, 2017	—	—	Amazon Sumerian	
87	Dispatch	United States	November 2017	—	—	Amazon Scout	
88	Blink Home	United States	December 2017	90,000,000	118,000,000	Blink Home	
89	Sqrrl	United States	January 23, 2018	40,000,000	51,000,000	Amazon Web Services	
90	Ring	United States	February 27, 2018	839,000,000	1.076×10^{9}	Ring	
91	PillPack	United States	June 28, 2018	753,000,000	965,000,000	Amazon Pharmacy	
92	Tapzo	India	August 28, 2018	40,000,000	51,000,000	Amazon Pay	
93	CloudEndure	Israel	January 10, 2019	250,000,000	315,000,000	Amazon Web Services	
94	TSO Logic	Canada	January 14, 2019	—	—	TSOLogic	
95	Eero	United States	February 11, 2019	97,000,000	122,000,000	Eero	
96	Canvas Technology	United States	April 10, 2019	—	—	Amazon Robotics	
97	Sizmek Ad Server and Sizmek Dynamic Creative Optimization	United States	May 31, 2019	—	—		
98	Bebo	United States	June 18, 2019	25,000,000	31,000,000	Twitch Interactive	
99	E8 Storage	Israel	July 31, 2019	—	—	Amazon Web Services	
100	IGDB	Sweden	September 17, 2019	—	—	Twitch Interactive	
101	INLT	United States	September 24, 2019	—	—		
102	Zoox	United States	June 26, 2020	1,200,000,000	1.493×10^{9}		
103	Wondery	United States	December 30, 2020	300,000,000	373,000,000	Amazon Music	
104	Umbra 3D	Finland	January 22, 2021	—	—	Amazon Robotics	
105	Metro-Goldwyn-Mayer	United States	May 26, 2021	8,450,000,000	1.0040×10^{10}	Amazon MGM Studios/Metro-Goldwyn-Mayer	
106	Art19	United States	June 24, 2021	—	—	Amazon Music	
107	Wickr	United States	June 25, 2021	—	—	Amazon Web Services	
108	Veeqo	United Kingdom	November 1, 2021	—	—		
109	Strio.AI	United States	March 7, 2022	—	—	Zoox	
110	GlowRoad	India	April 21, 2022	—	—		
111	One Medical	United States	July 21, 2022	3,900,000,000	4.291×10^{9}		
112	Cloostermans	Belgium	September 9, 2022	—	—		
113	Spirit.ai	United Kingdom	November 22, 2022	—	—	Twitch Interactive	
114	Fig	United States	August 28, 2023	—	—	AWS	
115	Pellicano Italy	—	January 12, 2024	—	—		
116	MX Player	India	June 7, 2024	—	—	Amazon Prime Video	
117	Perceive	United States	August 17, 2024	—	—		
118	Viziotix	France	July 2, 2025	—	—		
119	Bluush (Bee)	United States	July 22, 2025	—	—		
120	Axio	India	September 4, 2025	—	—		
121	Pixwise	United Kingdom	September 29, 2025	—	—		
122	Feenix.ai	United States	November 29, 2025	—	—		
123	Rivr	Switzerland	March 19, 2026	—	—		
124	Fauna Robotics	United States	March 25, 2026	—	—		
125	NLX	United States	April 7, 2026	—	—		
126	Globalstar	United States	October 28, 2026	11,500,000,000	1.1570×10^{10}	Amazon Leo	

== Stakes ==
Date	Company	Business	Country	% stake	Value (USD)	Adjusted (USD)	Refs
February 18, 1999	GeoWorks	Technology	United States	7%	$5,000,000	$10,000,000	
February 24, 1999	Drugstore.com	E-commerce	United States	40%poes	—	—	
May 19, 1999	Homegrocer.com	Grocery delivery	United States	35%	$42,500,000	$82,000,000	
July 15, 1999	Gear.com	Retail	United States	49%	—	—	
December 1, 1999	Ashford.com	Retail	United States	16.6%	$10,000,000	$19,000,000	
1999	Della.com	Gift registry	United States	20%	—	—	
1999	Kozmo.com	Delivery	United States	21.7%	—	—	
1999	Naxon Corporation		United States	61%	—	—	
March 29, 1999	Pets.com	Retail	United States	54%	—	—	
February 3, 2000	Greg Manning Auctions, Inc.	Auctioneering	United States	—	$5,000,000	$9,000,000	
March 28, 2000	Eziba.com	Retail	United States	20%	$17,500,000	$33,000,000	
2000	Basis Technology	Technology	United States	11%	—	—	
2000	Greenlight.com	Car retailer	United States	5%	—	—	
2001	Altura International		United States	20%	$5,000,000	$9,000,000	
2001	Daksh.com		United States	11%	—	—	
August 7, 2007	Amie Street	Music streaming	United States	—	—	—	
March 8, 2016/March 8, 2021	Air Transport Services Group	Cargo airline	United States	19.999%	$131,000,000	$176,000,000	
February 22, 2018	Greenlight Financial Technology Inc	Financial services	United States	—	—	—	
May 3, 2018	Embodied	Robotics	United States	—	—	—	
September 20, 2018	More	Supermarket chain	India	49%	$280,000,000	$359,000,000	
October 17, 2018	SevenRooms	Software	United States	—	—	—	
February 15, 2019	Rivian	Autonomous driving	United States	18%	—	—	
2019	YES Network	Sports television network	United States	15%	—	—	
September 25, 2023	Anthropic	Artificial intelligence	United States	—	$1,250,000,000 (Note: With an option to invest up to $4 billion)	$1.321×10^{9}	
October 30, 2024	Spotter	Digital creator economy	United States	—	—	—	

== Divestitures ==
Date	Acquirer	Target company	Target business	Acquirer country/nationality	Value (USD)	Adjusted (USD)	Refs
September 24, 2003	Scholastic	Back to Basics Toys	Toy retail	United States	$4,750,000	$8,000,000	
December 13, 2018	Wikia, Inc.	Curse LLC	Gaming websites	United States	—	—	

== See also ==
- List of largest mergers and acquisitions
- Lists of corporate acquisitions and mergers
