= European Laboratory for Learning and Intelligent Systems =

European non-profit promoting AI research in Europe

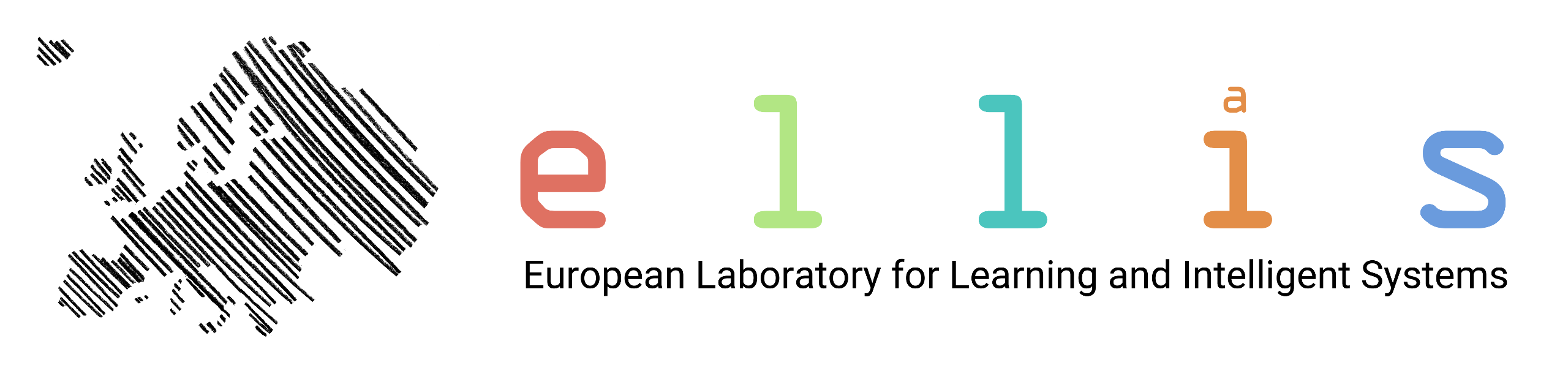
- Formation: 6 December 2018; 7 years ago
- Website: ellis.eu

ELLIS (European Laboratory for Learning and Intelligent Systems) is a pan-European artificial intelligence (AI) network of excellence which focuses on fundamental science, technical innovation and societal impact. Founded in 2018, ELLIS builds upon machine learning as the driver for modern AI and aims to secure Europe’s sovereignty in this competitive field by creating a multi-centric AI research laboratory. ELLIS consists of 43 sites, 16 research programs and a pan-European PhD & Postdoc Program.

== History ==
The organization was inspired by the Learning in Machines and Brains program of the Canadian Institute for Advanced Research. ELLIS was first proposed in an open letter to European governments in April 2018, which stated that Europe was not keeping up with the US and China. It urged that European governments act to provide opportunities and funding for world-class AI research in Europe.

It was founded on 6 December 2018 at the Conference on Neural Information Processing Systems (NeurIPS).

== Board ==
The members of the board are:

- Serge Belongie (University of Copenhagen & Cornell University)
- Nicolò Cesa-Bianchi (Università degli Studi di Milano)
- Florence d'Alché-Buc (Télécom Paris)
- Nada Lavrač (Jožef Stefan Institute)
- Neil D. Lawrence (University of Cambridge)
- Nuria Oliver (ELLIS Alicante Unit Foundation | Institute of Humanity-centric AI)
- Bernhard Schölkopf (Max Planck Institute for Intelligent Systems) Chairman
- Josef Sivic (Czech Technical University, École Normale Supérieure & INRIA)
- Sepp Hochreiter (Johannes Kepler University Linz) Board guest

== ELLIS sites ==
ELLIS is creating a network of research sites distributed across Europe and Israel. Currently, there are 43 sites in 17 countries.

ELLIS units
Name	Location	Director(s)	Ref(s).
ELLIS unit Alicante	Alicante, Spain	Nuria Oliver	
ELLIS unit Amsterdam	Amsterdam, Netherlands	Jan Willem van der Meent	
ELLIS unit Barcelona	Barcelona, Spain	Carme Torras, Dimosthenis Karatzas	
ELLIS unit Berlin	Berlin, Germany	Klaus-Robert Müller	
ELLIS unit Cambridge	Cambridge, United Kingdom	Carl Edward Rasmussen, José Miguel Hernández-Lobato	
ELLIS unit Copenhagen	Copenhagen, Denmark	Ole Winther	
ELLIS unit Darmstadt	Darmstadt, Germany	Stefan Roth	
ELLIS unit Delft	Delft, Netherlands	Frans Oliehoek	
ELLIS unit Edinburgh	Edinburgh, United Kingdom	Ivan Titov	
ELLIS unit Freiburg	Freiburg, Germany	Frank Hutter	
ELLIS unit Genoa	Genoa, Italy	Lorenzo Rosasco, Massimiliano Pontil	
ELLIS unit Graz	Graz, Austria	Wolfgang Maass	
ELLIS unit Haifa (Technion)	Haifa, Israel	Shie Mannor	
ELLIS unit Heidelberg	Heidelberg, Germany	Oliver Stegle	
ELLIS unit Helsinki	Helsinki, Finland	Samuel Kaski	
ELLIS unit Jena	Jena, Germany	Markus Reichstein, Joachim Denzler	
ELLIS unit Lausanne (EPFL)	Lausanne, Switzerland	Pascal Frossard	
ELLIS unit Leuven	Leuven, Belgium	Matthew Blaschko	
ELLIS unit Linz	Linz, Austria	Sepp Hochreiter	
ELLIS unit Lisbon	Lisbon, Portugal	Mario A. T. Figueiredo	
ELLIS unit London (UCL)	London, United Kingdom	Arthur Gretton	
ELLIS associate unit Lviv	Lviv, Ukraine	Rostyslav Hryniv	
ELLIS unit Madrid	Madrid, Spain	Pedro Larrañaga	
ELLIS unit Manchester	Manchester, United Kingdom	Magnus Rattray	
ELLIS unit Milan	Milan, Italy	Nicolò Cesa-Bianchi	
ELLIS unit Modena (Unimore)	Modena, Italy	Rita Cucchiara	
ELLIS unit Munich	Munich, Germany	Daniel Cremers, Fabian Theis	
ELLIS unit Nijmegen	Nijmegen, Netherlands	Marcel van Gerven	
ELLIS unit Oxford	Oxford, United Kingdom	Michael Wooldridge, Stephen Roberts, Yee Whye Teh	
ELLIS unit Paris	Paris, France	Gabriel Peyré	
ELLIS unit Prague	Prague, Czech Republic	Josef Sivic	
ELLIS unit Potsdam	Potsdam, Germany	Ralf Herbrich, Sebastian Reich, Katharina Ladewig	
ELLIS unit Saarbrücken	Saarbrücken, Germany	Bernt Schiele	
ELLIS unit Sofia	Sofia, Bulgaria	Luc Van Gool	
ELLIS unit Stuttgart	Stuttgart, Germany	Andreas Bulling	
ELLIS unit Tel Aviv	Tel Aviv, Israel	Amir Globerson	
ELLIS unit Trento	Trento, Italy	Nicu Sebe, Bruno Lepri	
ELLIS unit Tübingen	Tübingen, Germany	Bernhard Schölkopf, Matthias Bethge	
ELLIS Institute Tübingen	Tübingen, Germany	Bernhard Schölkopf	
ELLIS unit Turin	Turin, Italy	Tatiana Tommasi	
ELLIS unit Vienna (IST Austria)	Vienna, Austria	Christoph Lampert	
ELLIS unit Warsaw	Warsaw, Poland	Tomasz Trzciński	
ELLIS unit Zürich (ETH)	Zürich, Switzerland	Andreas Krause	

== Research programs ==
The ELLIS Programs are inspired by the CIFAR Program model, and closely collaborate with the CIFAR LMB (Learning in Machines and Brains) Program. Each Program has a budget for 2-3 workshops/year to enable meetings of 10-15 Fellows plus guests for intensive scientific exchange. Workshops can be co-located with academic meetings (usually) held in Europe, or organised as stand-alone events, usually at (and with the support of) ELLIS unit sites.

ELLIS research programs
Name	Director(s)
ELLIS Health	Gunnar Rätsch, Oliver Stegle, Mihaela van der Schaar
ELLIS Robot Learning: Closing the Reality Gap!	Tamim Asfour, Aude Billard, Jan Peters
Geometric Deep Learning	Michael Bronstein, Taco Cohen, Max Welling
Human-centric Machine Learning	Plamen P. Angelov, Nuria Oliver, Adrian Weller
Interactive Learning and Interventional Representations	Nicolò Cesa-Bianchi, Andreas Krause, Bernhard Schölkopf
Machine Learning and Computer Vision	Bernt Schiele, Cordelia Schmid, Yair Weiss
Machine Learning for Earth and Climate Sciences	Gustau Camps-Valls, Markus Reichstein
Multimodal Learning Systems	Cees Snoek, Nicu Sebe
Natural Intelligence	Matthias Bethge, Y-Lan Boureau, Peter Dayan
Natural Language Processing	André Martins, Iryna Gurevych, Ivan Titov
Quantum and Physics Based Machine Learning	Hilbert Johan Kappen, Riccardo Zecchina
Robust Machine Learning	Chris Holmes, Samuel Kaski, Yee Whye Teh
Semantic, Symbolic and Interpretable Machine Learning	Volker Tresp, Kristian Kersting, Paolo Frasconi
Theory, Algorithms and Computations of Modern Learning Systems	Francis Bach, Philipp Hennig, Lorenzo Rosasco

== PhD & Postdoc Program ==
The ELLIS PhD & Postdoc Program connects young researchers them to experienced researchers across Europe and offering networking and training activities, including summer schools and workshops.

There are two tracks within the ELLIS PhD & Postdoc Program: the academic track and the industry track. These tracks have separate requirements for admission and criteria for activity during the appointment, but otherwise offer the same benefits, network and resources to the applicant.

Academic track

PhD students and postdocs in the academic track strive for international collaboration as they partner with two European academic institutions in their research. These candidates are supervised by two advisors from different European countries: one of the advisors must be an ELLIS fellow/scholar or unit faculty; the other advisor should be an ELLIS fellow, scholar, unit faculty or member. PhDs and postdocs in the program visit the exchange institution for min. 6 months (the partitioning of this time is flexible). Normally, the exchange is partially sponsored by the exchange institution; students can also apply for the ELISE mobility grant to support their exchange.

Industry track

The industry track is open to PhD and postdoc candidates that will be part of a collaboration between an academic institution and an industry partner, and will spend time conducting research at the industry partner during their PhD or postdoc. The candidate will spend a minimum of 50% of their time at the academic institution, and at least 6 months (cumulative) with the industry partner.

For this track, both advisors may be located in the same country. One advisor will represent the academic institution and the other the industry partner. One advisor must be an ELLIS fellow/scholar or unit faculty. The second advisor can be an ELLIS fellow, scholar, member, unit faculty OR it is also possible for the second advisor to join if they have co-authored a paper with the applying student as a result of their collaboration, in a top-tier venue in machine learning or related sub-fields (details here).

Calls and admissions: There is a yearly central call for applications in fall, which will be announced on the ELLIS website. Admission to the program is competitive. For reference, about 5-10% of eligible applicants are accepted via the central call. The next chance to apply via the central recruiting is in fall 2024. Nomination to the program (for students who already started their PhD with ELLIS faculty) is possible year-round.
