= Rita Cucchiara =

Academic and Rector (born 13 March 1965)

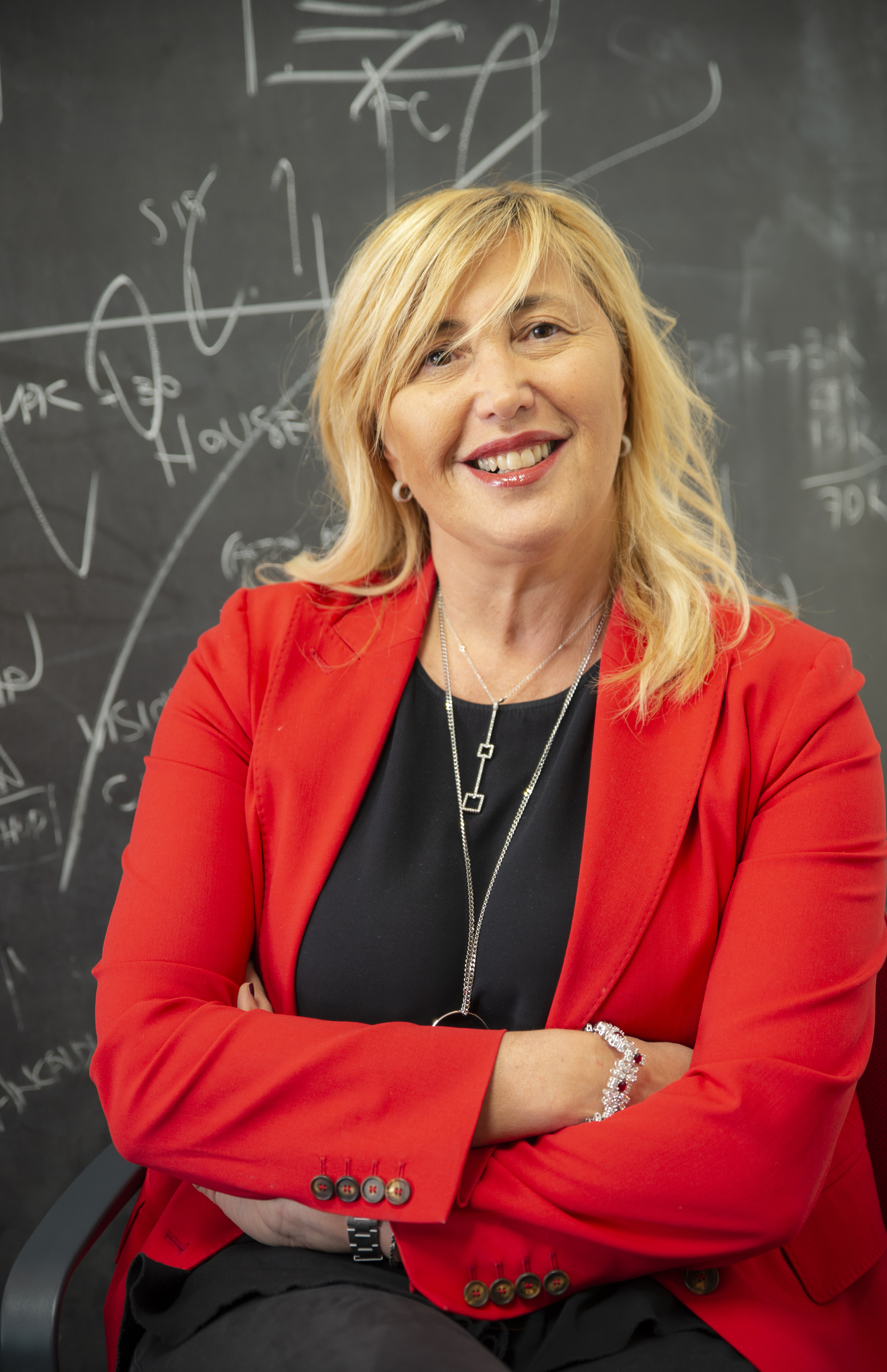

Rector of the University of Modena and Reggio Emilia
- Incumbent
- Assumed office 1 November 2025
- Preceded by: Carlo Adolfo Porro

Personal details
- Born: March 13, 1965 (age 61) Modena, Italy
- Education: University of Bologna; University of Ferrara
- Occupation: Computer engineer, academic

Rita Cucchiara (born 13 March 1965) is an Italian computer engineer, academic, and researcher in the field of computer vision and artificial intelligence. She has been appointed Rector of the University of Modena and Reggio Emilia (UNIMORE) starting from 1 November 2025, succeeding Carlo Adolfo Porro. She is currently Full Professor of Computer Engineering at UNIMORE, where she directed the AImageLab and the Interdepartmental Research Center AI Research and Innovation (AIRI).

== Early life and education ==
Rita Cucchiara was born in Modena, Italy, on 13 March 1965. She graduated with honors in Electronic Engineering from the University of Bologna in 1989 and earned her Ph.D. in Electronic and Computer Engineering in 1993 from the same university. During her doctoral studies, she was a visiting researcher at the University College London.

== Academic career ==
Cucchiara began her academic career as a researcher at the University of Ferrara (1993-1998). She later joined the University of Modena and Reggio Emilia, where she became Associate Professor and, since 2005, Full Professor of Computer Engineering.

At UNIMORE she leaded the AImageLab and coordinated the AI Research and Innovation Center (AIRI). She has supervised numerous Ph.D. students and postdoctoral researchers, and teaches courses of "Computer Architecture" and "Computer Vision and Cognitive Systems".

== Research ==
Cucchiara’s research focuses on computer vision, deep learning, multimodal vision-language models, generative AI, and human behavioral analysis in visual data. She is the author of over 600 scientific papers, with more than 33,000 citations and an h-index of 77, according to Google Scholar (2025).

She has coordinated or contributed to numerous European and national research projects, including HUMAN-E-AI, ELSA, ELIAS, ELLiOT, FIT4MedRob, and EcoSistER (PNRR). Her recent work includes applications of AI for cultural heritage and infrastructure safety.

Cucchiara also represents UNIMORE in the European initiative ELLIS - European Laboratory for Learning and Intelligent Systems, and collaborates with international institutions such as the University of Amsterdam, University of Central Florida, the Max Planck Institute for Intelligent Systems, and the Stanford AI Lab.

== Roles and public service ==
At the national level, Cucchiara has been a key figure in shaping Italy’s AI policy:

- Member of the Steering Committee for the National Artificial Intelligence Strategy 2024-2026 at the Italian Presidency of the Council of Ministers;
- Member of the Parliamentary Working Group on AI (2023-2024);
- Expert for the National Research Program (PNR) 2021-2027;
- Advisor to the Italian Ministry of Foreign Affairs and International Cooperation for Italy-Canada programs.

At the international level, she serves on the boards of:

- Italian Institute of Technology (IIT) (Board of Directors since 2017);
- FAIR – Future AI Research Foundation (PNRR);
- ART-ER Emilia-Romagna (Board Member);
- Advisory Boards of the Max Planck Institute for Intelligent Systems (Tübingen) and the Computer Vision Center (Barcelona);
- Board of Directors of ELLIS and ECVA (European Computer Vision Association);
- Advisory Committees of the Computer Vision Foundation and the IEEE PAMI Technical Committee.

== Election as Rector ==
On 27 June 2025, Cucchiara was elected Rector of the University of Modena and Reggio Emilia, defeating Tommaso Fabbri in the second round. She officially assumed office on 1 November 2025, succeeding Carlo Adolfo Porro.

== Awards and honors ==
- Maria Petrou Prize – International Association for Pattern Recognition (IAPR), 2018
- UNICEF Italy Golden Spider Award for scientific research, 2019
- Fellow of the IAPR (since 2006)
- ELLIS Fellow (2019)
- Ciliegia d’Oro Prize – Vignola Foundation, 2022
- Member of the Academy of Arts, Letters and Sciences of Modena (2022)
- Member of the Italian National Academy of Engineering and Technology (ItaTec, 2024)
- Included among the world’s top 2% most cited scientists, according to Stanford University (2025)
