= Emmanuel Letouzé =

French economist (born 1975)

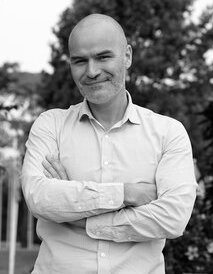
- Letouzé in 2019
- Born: 1975 (age 50–51); Rennes, France
- Occupations: Development economist; economic demographer; political cartoonist

Academic background
- Education: Sciences Po (BA, MA); Columbia University (MA); University of California, Berkeley (PhD)

Emmanuel Letouzé (born 1975) is a French development economist, economic demographer, and political cartoonist. His research focuses on the use of data and digital technologies in human development, and he is the co-founder and director of the Data-Pop Alliance, a research organization for data governance. He serves as an adjunct faculty at Columbia University, Sciences Po and ESADE.

== Early life and education ==
Letouzé was born in 1975. He completed his secondary schooling at Lycée Henri IV. He received Bachelor of Arts in political science and economics and Master of Arts in applied economics with a specialization in economic demography from Sciences Po, Paris as well as an MA in international affairs from Columbia University's School of International and Public Affairs on a Fulbright fellowship. Letouzé earned a PhD in Demographics from the University of California, Berkeley. His dissertation was titled "Applications and Implications of Call-Detail Records for Demo-Economic Analysis", which he wrote under the supervision of Ronald Lee, Edward Miguel, and Jennifer Johnson-Hanks.

He completed his post-doctoral research in 2016–17 at the MIT Media Lab in Alex 'Sandy' Pentland's Human Dynamics Group.

== Career ==
Between 2000 and 2004, Letouzé worked in Hanoi, Vietnam for the French Ministry of Finance and the French Ministry of Foreign Affairs, leading a technical assistance project on economic governance with the Vietnamese General Statistics Office, the Ministry of Finance, and the National Assembly. He then worked as an economist for the United Nations Development Program in New York between 2006 and 2009, on fiscal policy and fiscal space for poverty reduction, post-conflict economic recovery, and migration as part of the 2009 Human Development Report research team. In 2011, he joined the UN Global Pulse in the Executive Office of the UN Secretary General, where he wrote the paper "Big Data for Development: Challenges and Opportunities".

In 2013, he co-founded Data-Pop Alliance and in 2016, he co-founded the Open Algorithms project (OPAL), which he directed from 2017 to 2020. In 2021, Letouzé joined the Universitat Pompeu Fabra as a Marie Curie Fellow.

He was appointed Member of the European Commission's Expert Group on Facilitating the use of new data sources for official statistics (March 2021 – March 2022)

=== Political cartooning ===
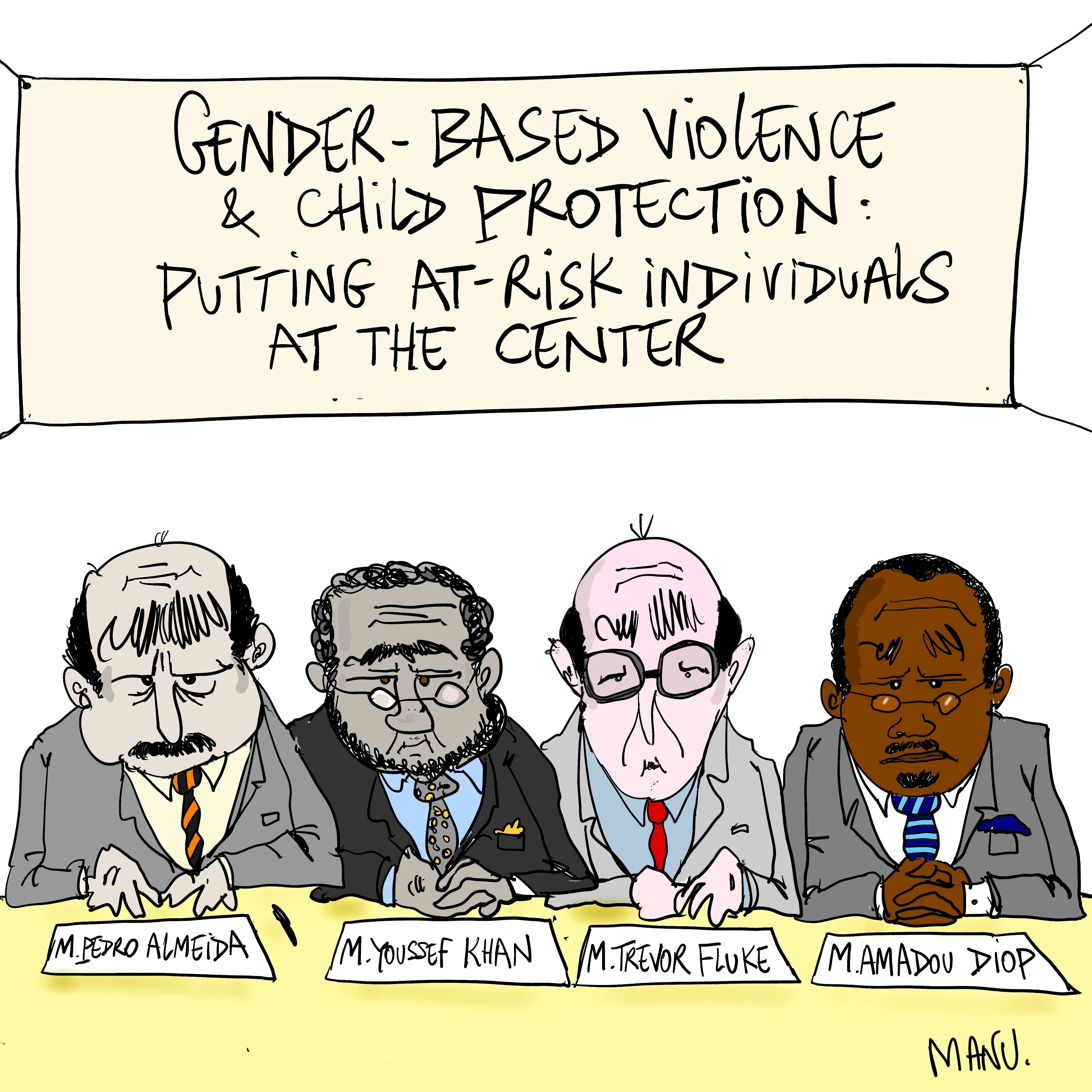
Cartoon by Manu

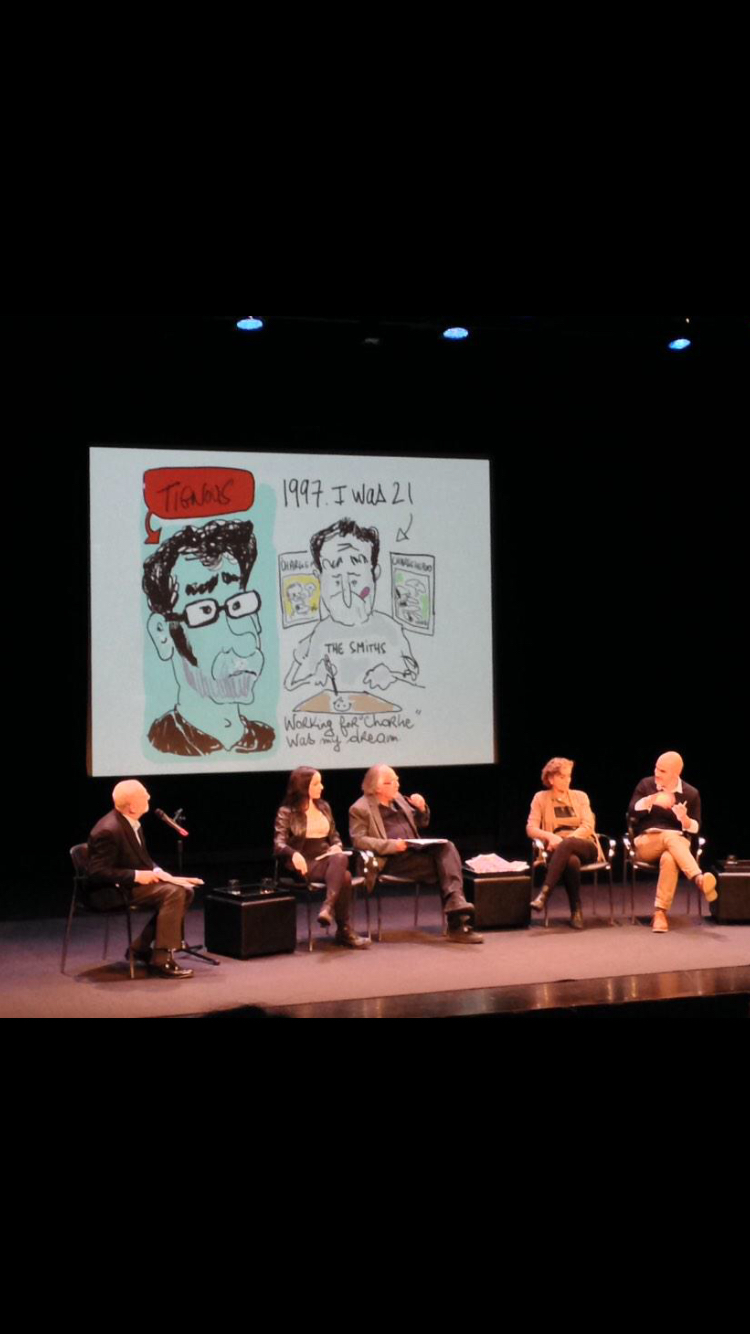
Je suis Charlie panel

Letouzé is a political cartoonist under the pen name "Manu", publishing in France and the US. He was the editorial cartoonist of the French regional daily newspaper L'Union de Reims from 1997 to 2004, publishing over 350 cartoons. He has also contributed political cartoons to the weekly magazine Politis, the news website Rue89, and the satirical website Stuff Expat Aid Workers Like. He held a solo exhibition at The Invisible Dog Art Center in New York in 2011, and became an appointed member of the Cartoon Movement in 2012.

In 2011, he took part in the response to the first attack against Charlie Hebdo's offices and provided cartoons in support of the campaign for marriage equality in France. In January 2015, in the wake of the 2015 Charlie Hebdo shooting, he published a tribute to the Charlie Hebdo cartoonists entitled "They Killed My Idols" in The Nib. Further, in February 2015, he participated in a debate organized by PEN America, the French Institute Alliance Française (FIAF), and the National Coalition Against Censorship (NCAC) on "After Charlie: What's next for art, satire, and censorship?" at FIAF with Art Spiegleman, Molly Crabapple and Francoise Mouly.

He has provided cartoons and illustrations for the International Peace Institute's Management Handbook for UN Peacekeeping missions.
