= Nuria Oliver =

Spanish computer scientist

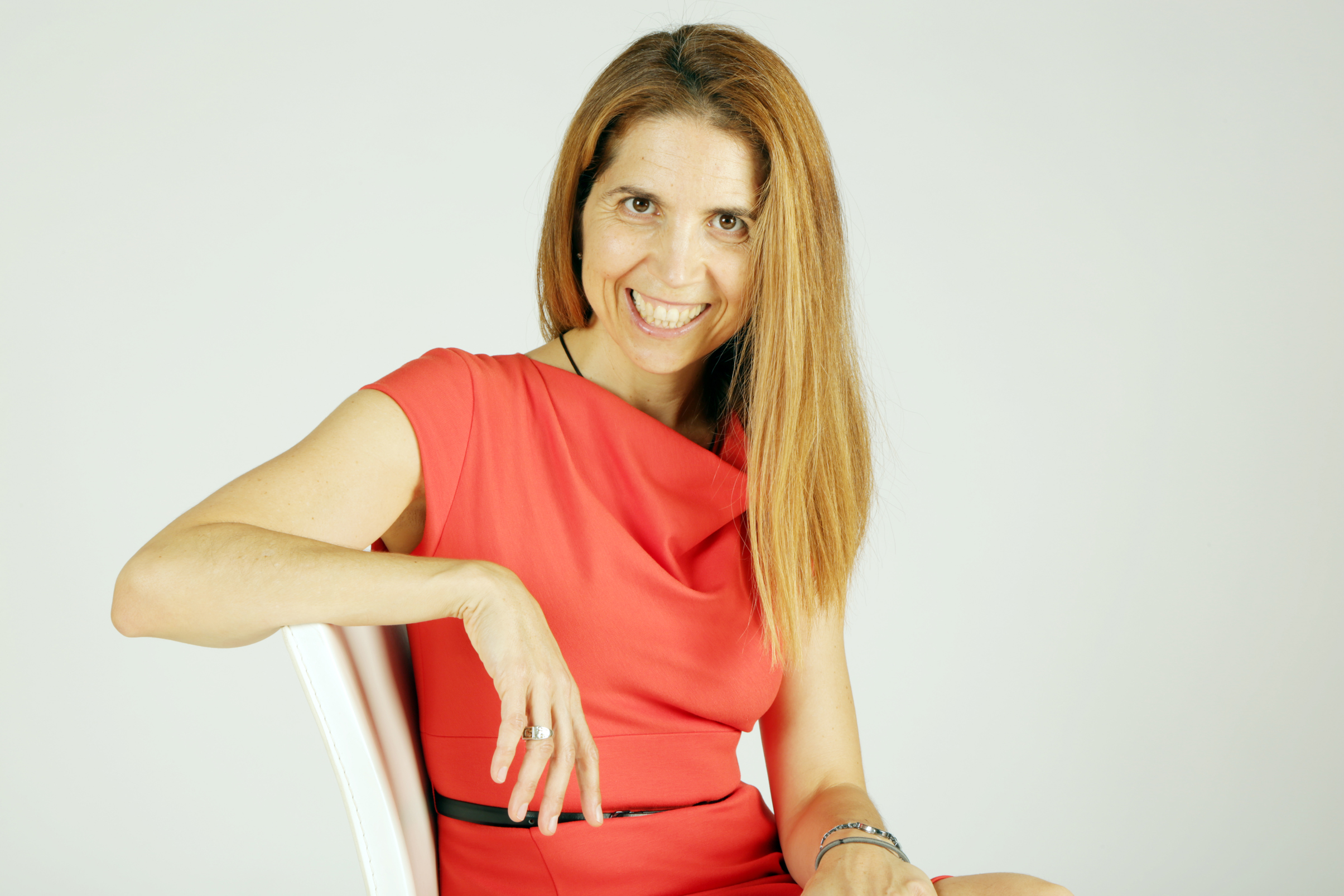
- Born: Alicante
- Education: Massachusetts Institute of Technology (MIT); Universidad Politecnica de Madrid
- Scientific career
- Fields: Artificial Intelligence; Perceptual Intelligence; Human Behavior Modeling; Mobile Computing; Human-Computer Interaction (HCI); Big Data Analytics
- Workplaces: ELLIS; Vodafone; Telefónica; Microsoft Research; UNED
- Thesis: Towards Perceptual Computing: Statistical Modeling of Human Individual and Interactive Behaviors (2000)
- Doctoral advisor: Alex Pentland
- Website: http://www.nuriaoliver.com

Nuria Oliver is a computer scientist. She is the director of the ELLIS Alicante Foundation, Chief Data Scientist at DataPop Alliance, and president of the board of trustees of UNED. Previously, she was an independent director on the board of directors of Bankia, Commissioner of the Presidency of Valencia for AI and COVID-19, Director of Data Science Research at Vodafone, Scientific Director at Telefónica and researcher at Microsoft Research. She holds a PhD from the Media Lab at MIT, and is an IEEE Fellow, ACM Fellow, a member of the board of ELLIS, and elected permanent member of the Royal Academy of Engineering of Spain. She is one of the most cited female computer scientists in Spain, with her research having been cited by more than 24,000 publications. She is well known for her work in computational models of human behavior, human computer-interaction, mobile computing and big data for social good.

== Biography ==
Nuria graduated with a degree in Telecommunications Engineering from the Universidad Politecnica de Madrid in 1994. She was awarded the Spanish First National Prize of Telecommunication Engineers in 1994.

In 1995 she received a La Caixa fellowship to study at MIT, where she received her doctorate at the Media Lab in the area perceptual intelligence. In 2000, she joined as a Research in the area of human-computer interfaces for Microsoft Research in Redmond USA and worked there until 2007.

In 2007 she moved to Spain to work at Telefónica R&D in Barcelona as Director of Multimedia Research, the only female director hired at Telefónica R&D at the time. Her work focused on the use of the mobile phone as a sensor of human activity, and worked there until 2016.

In 2017 she joined Vodafone as Director of Data Science Research, and also was named the first Chief Data Scientist at DataPop Alliance, an international non-profit organization created by the Harvard Humanitarian Initiative, MIT Media Lab and Overseas Development Institute devoted to leveraging Big Data to improve the world. She served as Chief Scientific Adviser at the Vodafone Institute until 2024.

She is a member of the external advisory board of the ETIC department at the Pompeu Fabra University, the LASIGE department at the University of Lisbon, the Informatics Department at King's College London, the eHealth Center at the Open University of Catalonia and Mahindra Comviva. She is the spokesperson and a member of the High Level Advisory Committee to the Spanish Government on Artificial Intelligence and Big Data. She is also a member of the Strategic Advisory Board to the Innovation Agency of Valencia.

In 2018 she was elected permanent member of the Spanish Royal Academy of Engineering.

In 2019, she launched a successful bid for Alicante to host a research unit of ELLIS, a network of European AI research laboratories.

In 2020 during the COVID-19 pandemic, she was named Commissioner of the Presidency of Valencia for AI and COVID-19, and led the data-science team for the Valencian Government during the crisis until March 2022. She was responsible for designing and launching covid19impactsurvey, one of the largest citizen-science surveys in Spain, with over 700,000 participants.

She was co-leader of ValenciaIA4COVID, the winning team of the $500,000 XPRIZE Pandemic Response Challenge, sponsored by Cogizant. This was the first Spanish team to win an XPrize competition.

In 2024 she was selected by the EU as the chair General Purpose AI transparency code-of-practice working group, as part of implementing the AI Act. She was also the winner of the 2024 Hypatia European Science Prize, awarded by the city of Barcelona and Academia Europaea.

== Awards and honors ==
- Spanish First National Prize of Telecommunication Engineers in 1994
- Top 100 innovators under 35 (TR100, today TR35) by MIT Technology Review, based on her work in intelligent human-computer interfaces.
- "100 future leaders who will design Spain in the next decades" by El Capital Magazine in 2009.
- Best paper award in ACM Multimedia 2009 for her research on duplicate video detection.
- Best paper award of ACM MobileHCI 2009 for her research on comparing speech and text on mobile phones.
- Rising Talent by the Women's Forum for the Economy and Society.
- ACM RecSys 2012 best paper award on collaborative filtering.
- Profiled as one of nine female Spanish leaders in technology in 2012 by the Spanish newspaper El País.
- ACM ICMI Ten Year Technical Impact Award as one of the authors of a paper on layered graphical models of human behavior. The paper described a system that was able to discern the activity of a user based on evidence from video, acoustic and computer interactions.
- ACM Ubicomp 2014 best paper award for her work on economic value of personal data.
- ACM Distinguished Member, being the first Spanish female computer scientist to receive this award.
- Best paper award in ACM Ubicomp 2015 for her research on boredom detection using mobile phones.
- Fellow of the European Association of Artificial Intelligence (ECCAI).
- IEEE Fellow, recognizing her work in probabilistic models of human behavior and design of interactive intelligent systems.
- Winner of the 2016 European Digital Woman of the Year Award
- Top 100 female leader in Spain by Mujeres&Cia
- "Salvà i Campillo" prize by the Catalan association of telecommunication engineers
- Ada Byron Award from the University of Deusto, a Spanish prize at the national level which highlights the work of women who bring progress to new areas of technology. It recognized her work in artificial intelligence, big data, human-machine interaction, computational models of human behavior and mobile computing.
- Gaudí Gresol award
- 2016 Ángela Ruiz Robles Spanish National Computer Science Award
- Honorary doctorate by the Universidad Miguel Hernández of Elche
- Distinction of the Government of the Valencian Community in 2017
- Named ACM Fellow in 2017 for her contributions in probabilistic multimodal models of human behavior and uses in intelligent, interactive systems.
- Named elected academic of the Spanish Royal Academy of Engineering (2018).
- Elected to Academia Europaea, 2018
- Winner of European DatSci & AI 2019 Data Scientist of the Year
- Winner of the Esri Data Scientist of the Year 2020
- Winner of the "Women to Follow" award 2020 (technology section)
- Winner of the 500k XPRIZE Pandemic Response Challenge sponsored by Cognizant
- Winner of the 2021 Rey Jaime I award in New Technologies
- Winner of the 2021 Technical Leadership Award by AnitaB.org

== Keynotes and scientific talks (selected) ==
- IJCAI 2001: Live demo with Eric Horvitz of a context aware office activity recognition system during Bill Gates keynote speech at IJCAI 2001.
- TTI Vanguard 2006: Invited Speaker.
- CICV 2010 IEEE workshop: Plenary speaker, "Research Challenges and Opportunities in Multimedia: a Human Centric Perspective"
- UCVP 2011: Keynote speaker
- EUSIPCO 2011: Keynote speaker, "Urban Computing and Smart Cities: Opportunities and Challenges"
- NIPS 2011 Big Learning - Algorithms, Systems & Tools Workshop: Keynote speaker, "Towards Human Behavior Understanding from Pervasive Data: Opportunities and Challenges Ahead"
- European Wireless 2014: Keynote speaker, "Small devices for big impact"
- ACM/IEEE Models 2014: Keynote speaker, "Towards data-driven models of human behavior"
- NTTS 2015 (New Techniques and Technologies for Statistics): Keynote speaker, "Big Mobile Data for Official Statistics"
- IEEE Int Conf on Data Science and Advanced Analytics 2015 (IEEE DSAA): Keynote speaker, "Towards data-driven models of human behavior"
- ACM Intelligent Environments 2016 (ACM IE): Keynote speaker, "Towards human behavior modeling from data"
- IAPP Europe Data Protection Congress 2016 (IAPP DPC): Visionary keynote speaker, "Big data for social good"

== Media appearances ==
- 1998: Presentation to Spanish Senate
- 2001: Interview with El País: People never associate Spain with 'high tech'
- 2004: Interview with El País: A Spaniard at the digital peak
- 2005: Featured on La 2 (Spain) TV program "De cerca" [Close up]: "Conversation with Alicante native Nuria Oliver, research at Microsoft about the latest advances in artificial intelligence".
- 2006: Interview with El País: Voyage to the center of Microsoft.
- 2008: Speech in front of the King and Queen of Spain
- 2010: Featured on TV program "Para todos" [For everyone] on La 2 (Spain)
- 2012: TEDxRamblas Talk: The Invisible Army.
- 2012: Radio Interview as an expert on Artificial Intelligence
- 2013: TEDxBarcelona Talk: My cellphone, my partner.
- 2013: Talk at WIRED 2013: What big data and the Mexican pandemic taught us.
- 2014: Personal Data Monetization at MIT Technology Review, the Washington Post and other media.
- 2014: Predicting crime using mobile data.
- 2014: Interview by BBC: Ebola: Can big data analytics help contain its spread?
- 2015: Interview with ARA: "We look at our phone because we are constantly rewarded"
- 2015: Interview with Glamour magazine: "Women with success"
- 2015: El Mundo: Predicting a crime using 'big data'
- 2015: Interview for Barcelona Metropolis Magazine: Nothing in excess, including technology
- 2015: Article for El País newspaper: The mobile phone sheds its skin
- 2015: NBC news: Next thing your phone may detect: boredom
- 2015: MIT Technology Review: Your smartphone can tell if you're bored
- 2015: Fortune magazine: Your phone can tell when you're bored
- 2015: RNE Radio 3: Interview to Nuria Oliver on Artificial Intelligence
- 2015: Featured article for El País Sunday magazine: Nuria Oliver
- 2016: RTVE 2: Interview with Nuria Oliver on Mobile Computing in "El cazador de cerebros" program
- 2017: El Periódico de Catalunya: Nuria Oliver: Questioning the status quo
- 2019: La Vanguardia: Nuria Oliver: a brilliant mind in artificial intelligence
- 2020: El Mundo: The women of the new decade - Nuria Oliver - She knows (almost) everything about the relationship between humans and computers
- 2020: Politico Europe: How AI is helping fight a pandemic - Europe's coronavirus app - Insights from Valencia

== See also ==
- European Laboratory for Learning and Intelligent Systems
