= Riseman =

Riseman is a surname. Notable people with the surname include:

- Edward M. Riseman (1942–2007), American computer scientist
- Shoshana Riseman (born 1948), Israeli music educator
- Walter Riseman, American politician

== See also ==
- Wiseman (surname)
