= Robert Cohn =

Canadian businessman

- Born: Winnipeg, Manitoba, Canada
- Occupation: Founder of Octel Communications

Robert "Bob" Cohn is a Canadian-born entrepreneur and American businessman known for founding Octel Communications, the company that commercialized voice mail and was largely responsible for making it ubiquitous on cell phones, in companies and on residential phones.

In 1982, Cohn founded Octel Communications Corporation. He was chairman and CEO of Octel from its inception in 1982 until the company was purchased by Lucent Technologies in 1997. He then was an Executive Vice President of Lucent Technologies, Inc. and retired April 30, 1999. From 2002 to 2004, Cohn was a partner with Sequoia Capital. He mentors and advises first-time CEOs and rising stars in technology businesses.

Before Octel, Cohn held positions with McKinsey & Company, and Banque Rothschild in France.

He has a BS degree in mathematics and computer science from the University of Florida and an MBA from Stanford University’s Graduate School of Business.

== Octel Communications ==
Cohn and Peter Olson founded Octel Communications in September, 1982. Octel started shipping product in 1984, became profitable and started generating cash in 1985, and went public in 1988. Octel was the first technology company to go public after the stock market crash of 1987. Within a few years it became the biggest supplier of voicemail in all sectors worldwide.

Octel adopted many of Silicon Valley's successful cultural concepts like employee sabbaticals, 100% participation in stock option plans, comprehensive employee performance reviews and career planning, an internal fitness center, and Octel University to give all employees new skills and ongoing training. Octel was among the first to offer AIDS education, "take-your-daughter/son-to-work" day, and universal medical coverage including pre-existing conditions.

Lucent Technologies acquired Octel in 1997 for over $2 billion in cash and assumption of options. Lucent's Audix products were combined with Octel's to create the Octel Messaging Division based in Milpitas, California. Revenues of the Octel Messaging Division in the year Octel was acquired exceeded $1.2 billion, and its profits immediately enabled the Business Systems Group of Lucent Technologies to operate in the black. At the time of the acquisition, Octel was the worldwide market share leader in sales of voicemail systems to corporations and service providers. He was made an Executive Vice President of Lucent Technologies and President of the Octel Messaging Division.

== Boards and advisory activities ==
Cohn actively advises a select group of first-time CEOs, primarily in Silicon Valley, including Mux (internet video infrastructure), Ironclad (digital contract management), Monte Carlo Data (data reliability), Spindle AI (prescriptive analytics software), Clockwise (automated calendar management), Vorlon (cyber security), Joyned (collaborative shopping), and Acurex Biosciences Corporation (seeking a cure for Parkinson's Disease). Cohn is a member of the Council on Foreign Relations and Business Executives for National Security. He was previously a Senior Advisor to Coatue Management, a New York-based, tech-only hedge fund, a trustee of Robert Ballard’s Ocean Exploration Trust (which operates the EVNautilus), a member of the Defense Reform CEO Panel for United States Secretary of Defense, William Cohen, and a Board Member Emeritus of Business Executives for National Security, a volunteer organization of business leaders that works with the Department of Defense.

Cohn has been on the boards of many companies, private and public. Some of these were Octel, Trimble Navigation (GPS navigation), King Digital Entertainment (makers of the popular game Candy Crush Saga), Charter Communications (cable company), Electronic Arts (video games), Ashford.com (high-end online retail), and Digital Domain (special effects for commercials and feature films). He was Chairman of the Board of Right Hemisphere (3-D software, now part of SAP), Taboola (advertising), and RelateIQ (CRM, now part of Salesforce.com). He was a member of the Board of Governors of NASDAQ from 1990 through 1993 where he also was on the Executive Committee; a member of the Advisory Council of the Stanford Graduate School of Business from 1993 to 1999; a board member of the National Conference for Community and Justice (a national organization devoted to addressing the issues of bigotry, bias and racism in America). He was a trustee of the Ballet San Jose, Castilleja School, and the International School of the Peninsula. He was previously a member of the American Business Conference, the Council on Competitiveness, and the World Economic Forum in Davos, Switzerland, where he was also an industry governor in the Data and Communications sector for five years.
