= Edward M. Riseman =

American computer scientist (1942–2007)

- Born: August 15, 1942; Washington, D.C., US
- Died: February 26, 2007 (aged 64); Leeds, Massachusetts, US
- Education: Clarkson University; Cornell University
- Scientific career
- Fields: Computer Science
- Workplaces: University of Massachusetts Amherst
- Thesis: Feature detection networks in pattern recognition (1969)
- Doctoral advisor: Henry D. Block
- Doctoral students: Padmanabhan Anandan; Ronald Arkin

Edward Martin Riseman (August 15, 1942 – February 26, 2007) was an American computer scientist and a Professor Emeritus at the University of Massachusetts Amherst. Riseman was a pioneer in the field of computer vision and artificial intelligence who made significant contributions to image database and content-based image retrieval, including the design of one of the first knowledge-based image understanding systems that handled very complex natural images. He was a co-author on the landmark paper on a four-step process for extracting straight lines from intensity images. Riseman was a Fellow of the American Association for Artificial Intelligence (AAAI), a senior member of the Institute of Electrical and Electronics Engineers (IEEE), a member of the Association for Computing Machinery (ACM), and a member of the Pattern Recognition Society.

== Biography ==
=== Education ===
Edward Riseman received his B.S. degree in electrical engineering from Clarkson College of Technology (now Clarkson University) in 1964. He moved to Cornell University and received M.S. and Ph.D. degrees in electrical engineering in 1966 and 1969, respectively.

=== Career ===
Shortly after receiving his Ph.D., Edward Riseman joined the faculty of University of Massachusetts Amherst as an assistant professor. He was promoted to a full professor in 1978, and served as the chairman of the Computer Science department from 1981 to 1985. During his tenure at the University of Massachusetts, Riseman was the advisor to 38 Ph.D. graduates.
