= Mario A. T. Figueiredo =

Portuguese engineer, academic

Mário A. T. Figueiredo
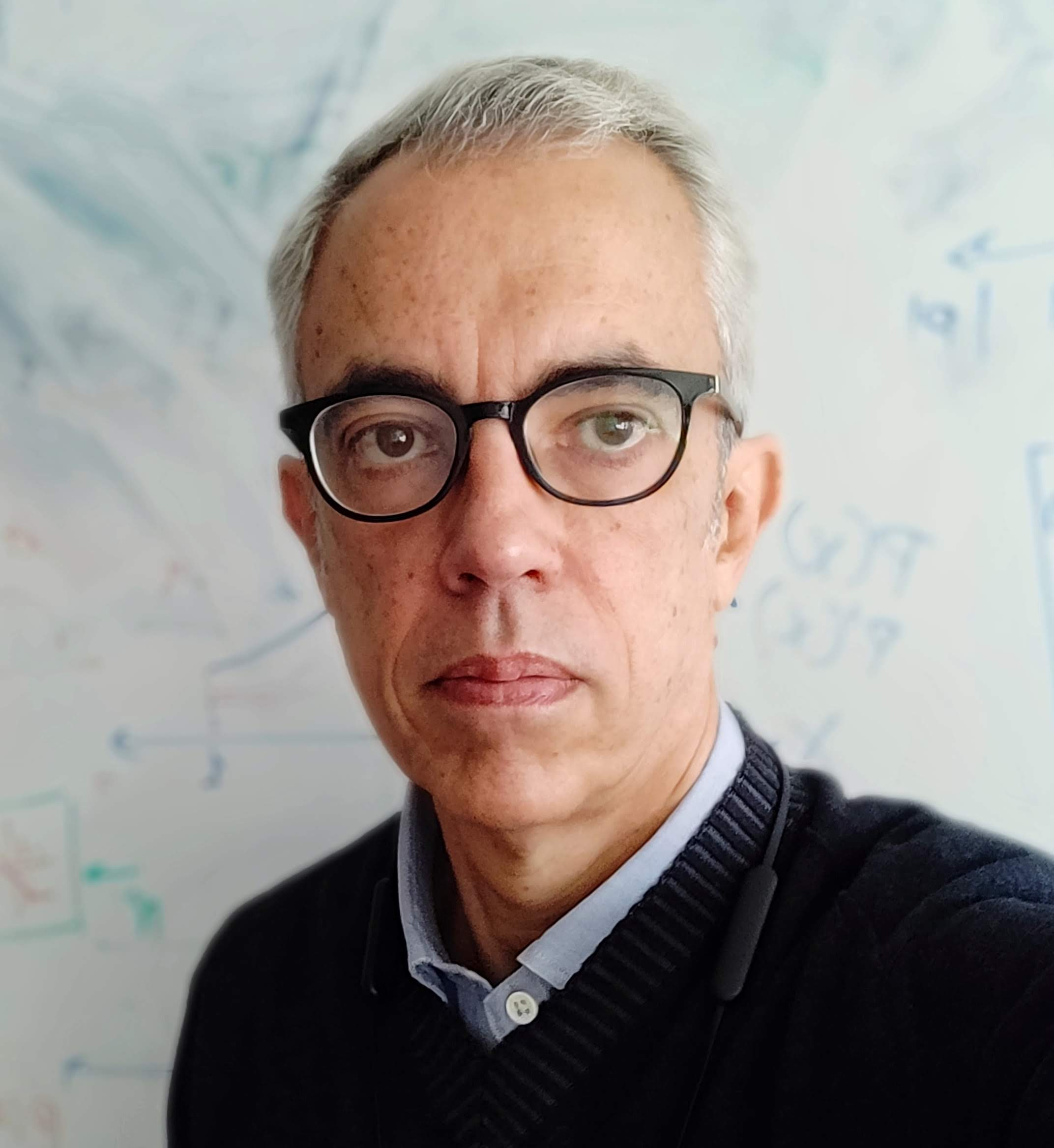
- Occupations: Academic and researcher
- Awards: Fellow, International Association for Pattern Recognition (IAPR); Fellow, Institute of Electrical and Electronics Engineers (IEEE); Fellow, European Association for Signal Processing (EURASIP); Fellow, European Laboratory for Learning and Intelligent Systems (ELLIS)

Academic background
- Education: M.Sc., Electrical and Computer Engineering, IST, 1990; Ph.D., Electrical and Computer Engineering, IST, 1994; Agregação (habilitation), Electrical and Computer Engineering, IST, 2004

Academic work
- Institutions: IST, University of Lisbon

Mário A. T. Figueiredo is a Portuguese engineer and academic. He is an IST Distinguished Professor and holds the Feedzai Chair of Machine Learning at IST, University of Lisbon. His research is focused on signal and image processing, and Machine Learning.

Figueiredo is a Fellow of the European Association for Signal Processing (EURASIP), the Institute of Electrical and Electronics Engineers (IEEE), the International Association for Pattern Recognition (IAPR), and the European Laboratory for Learning and Intelligent Systems (ELLIS).

== Education ==
In 1990, Figueiredo received his master's degree from the Instituto Superior Técnico (IST) at the University of Lisbon, Portugal, in Electrical and Computer Engineering. He also earned his Ph.D. and his habilitation (Agregação) in Electrical and Computer Engineering from the same institute in 1994 and 2004, respectively.

== Career ==
Mário Figueiredo began his academic career in 1994 as an assistant professor of the Department of Electrical and Computer Engineering at IST, University of Lisbon. From 2004 to 2010, he was an associate professor. In 2019, he was became full professor and an IST Distinguished Professor.

Figueiredo has focused his research on machine learning, signal processing and image processing.

== Awards and honors ==
- 2009 - Fellow, International Association for Pattern Recognition (IAPR)
- 2010 - Fellow, Institute of Electrical and Electronics Engineers (IEEE)
- 2014 - W. R. G. Baker Award, IEEE
- 2016 - Individual Technical Achievement Award, EURASIP
- 2016 - Pierre Devijver Award, IAPR
- 2019 - Fellow, European Laboratory for Learning and Intelligent Systems (ELLIS)
- 2019 - Member, the Portuguese Academy of Engineering
- 2019 - Corresponding Member, the Lisbon Academy of Sciences
- 2020 - Fellow, EURASIP
- 2023 - Effective Member, the Lisbon Academy of Sciences

== Selected publications ==
- Figueiredo, M. A.; Nowak, R. D.; Wright, S. J. (2007). "Gradient projection for sparse reconstruction: Application to compressed sensing and other inverse problems". IEEE Journal of Selected Topics in Signal Processing. 1 (4): 586–597. Bibcode:2007ISTSP...1..586F. doi:10.1109/JSTSP.2007.910281.
- Figueiredo, M. A. T.; Jain, A. K. (2002). "Unsupervised learning of finite mixture models". IEEE Transactions on Pattern Analysis and Machine Intelligence. 24 (3): 381–396. doi:10.1109/34.990138.
- Wright, S. J.; Nowak, R. D.; Figueiredo, M. A. (2009). "Sparse reconstruction by separable approximation". IEEE Transactions on Signal Processing. 57 (7): 2479–2493. Bibcode:2009ITSP...57.2479W. doi:10.1109/TSP.2009.2016892.
- Bioucas-Dias, J. M.; Figueiredo, M. A. (2007). "A new TwIST: Two-step iterative shrinkage/thresholding algorithms for image restoration". IEEE Transactions on Image Processing. 16 (12): 2992–3004. Bibcode:2007ITIP...16.2992B. doi:10.1109/TIP.2007.909319. PMID 18092598.
- Figueiredo, M. A.; Nowak, R. D. (2003). "An EM algorithm for wavelet-based image restoration". IEEE Transactions on Image Processing. 12 (8): 906–916. doi:10.1109/TIP.2003.815261. PMID 18237962.
