= Bernt Schiele =

German computer scientist

- Born: November 3, 1968 (age 57); Neustadt an der Weinstraße
- Education: Karlsruhe Institute of Technology (KIT), Ensimag, Grenoble INP
- Scientific career
- Fields: Computer vision
- Workplaces: Technische Universität Darmstadt, Saarland University, Max Planck Institute for Informatics
- Doctoral advisor: James L. Crowley

Bernt Schiele (born November 3, 1968, in Neustadt) is a German computer scientist. He is Max Planck Director at the Max Planck Institute for Informatics and professor at Saarland University. He is known for his work in the field of computer vision and perceptual computing.

== Life ==
Schiele studied computer science at the Karlsruhe Institute of Technology (KIT) and at the École nationale supérieure d'informatique et de mathématiques appliquées de Grenoble (Ensimag). He received his diploma in computer science from Ensimag in 1993 and from the University of Karlsruhe in 1994. In 1994, he was visiting researcher at the Carnegie Mellon University. In 1997, he received his Ph.D. under the supervision of James L. Crowley from Grenoble Institute of Technology (Grenoble INP). From 1999 to 2004 he was assistant professor at ETH Zurich. From 1997 to 2000, he was postdoctoral associate and visiting assistant professor in the group of Alex Pentland at the Massachusetts Institute of Technology (MIT). From 2004 to 2010 he was professor at the department of computer science of the Technische Universität Darmstadt. Since 2010 Schiele has been Max Planck Director at the Max Planck Institute for Informatics and professor at Saarland University.

== Awards ==
- Fellow of the International Association for Pattern Recognition (IAPR)
- Fellow of the IEEE

== Publications ==
- P. Dollar, C. Wojek, B. Schiele and P. Perona, "Pedestrian Detection: An Evaluation of the State of the Art," in IEEE Transactions on Pattern Analysis and Machine Intelligence, vol. 34, no. 4, pp. 743–761, April 2012. doi:10.1109/TPAMI.2011.155
- Leibe, B., Leonardis, A. & Schiele, B. Int J Comput Vis (2008) 77: 259. https://doi.org/10.1007/s11263-007-0095-3
