= Katherine Kuchenbecker =

American haptics researcher

Katherine Julianne Kuchenbecker is the Director of the Haptic Intelligence department at the Max Planck Institute for Intelligent Systems in Germany and an Honorary Professor at the University of Stuttgart. She is an American researcher focussing on haptic technology and robot-assisted surgery, and a former high school and college volleyball player.

== Education and career ==
Kuchenbecker became a Director at the Max Planck Institute for Intelligent Systems in 2017, where she leads an interdisciplinary team that invents haptic interfaces for touching virtual and remote environments, studies human haptic interaction, and endows autonomous robots with an astute sense of touch. Her research blends robotics and human-computer interaction with particular foci in haptics, teleoperation, physical human-robot interaction, tactile sensing, and medical applications.

Kuchenbecker earned her Ph.D. in mechanical engineering at Stanford University in 2006 after earning a bachelor's degree in 2000 and a master's degree in 2002. Her dissertation, Characterizing and Controlling the High-Frequency Dynamics of Haptic Interfaces, was supervised by Günter Niemeyer.

Kuchenbecker continued with her postdoctoral research at Johns Hopkins University. In 2007, she joined the faculty of the University of Pennsylvania Department of Mechanical Engineering and Applied Mechanics as Skirkanich Assistant Professor of Innovation. She was tenured as an associate professor in 2013, and named to the Class of 1940 Bicentennial Endowed Term Chair in 2015.

She delivered a TEDYouth talk on haptics in 2012 and has been honored with a 2009 NSF CAREER Award, the 2012 IEEE RAS Academic Early Career Award, a 2014 Penn Lindback Award for Distinguished Teaching, and various best paper, poster, demonstration, and reviewer awards. She co-chaired the Technical Committee on Haptics from 2015 to 2017 and the IEEE Haptics Symposium in 2016 and 2018.

Kuchenbecker is the spokesperson for the International Max Planck Research School for Intelligent Systems (IMPRS-IS), a large Ph.D. program jointly operated by MPI-IS and the University of Stuttgart and the University of Tübingen.

Kuchenbecker grew up in Southern California, and played volleyball in high school for the Brentwood School Eagles, participating in two state championships. As an undergraduate, she played on the varsity volleyball team from 1996 to 1998, which had two national championship wins.

== Recognition ==
In 2011, Popular Science named her to their "Brilliant 10" of 2010, for her work on haptics, including a haptic video-gaming vest. Kuchenbecker was named an IEEE Fellow in 2022, "for contributions to interactive haptic systems and robotic touch perception".
