= Ronald C. Arkin =

American roboticist and roboethicist

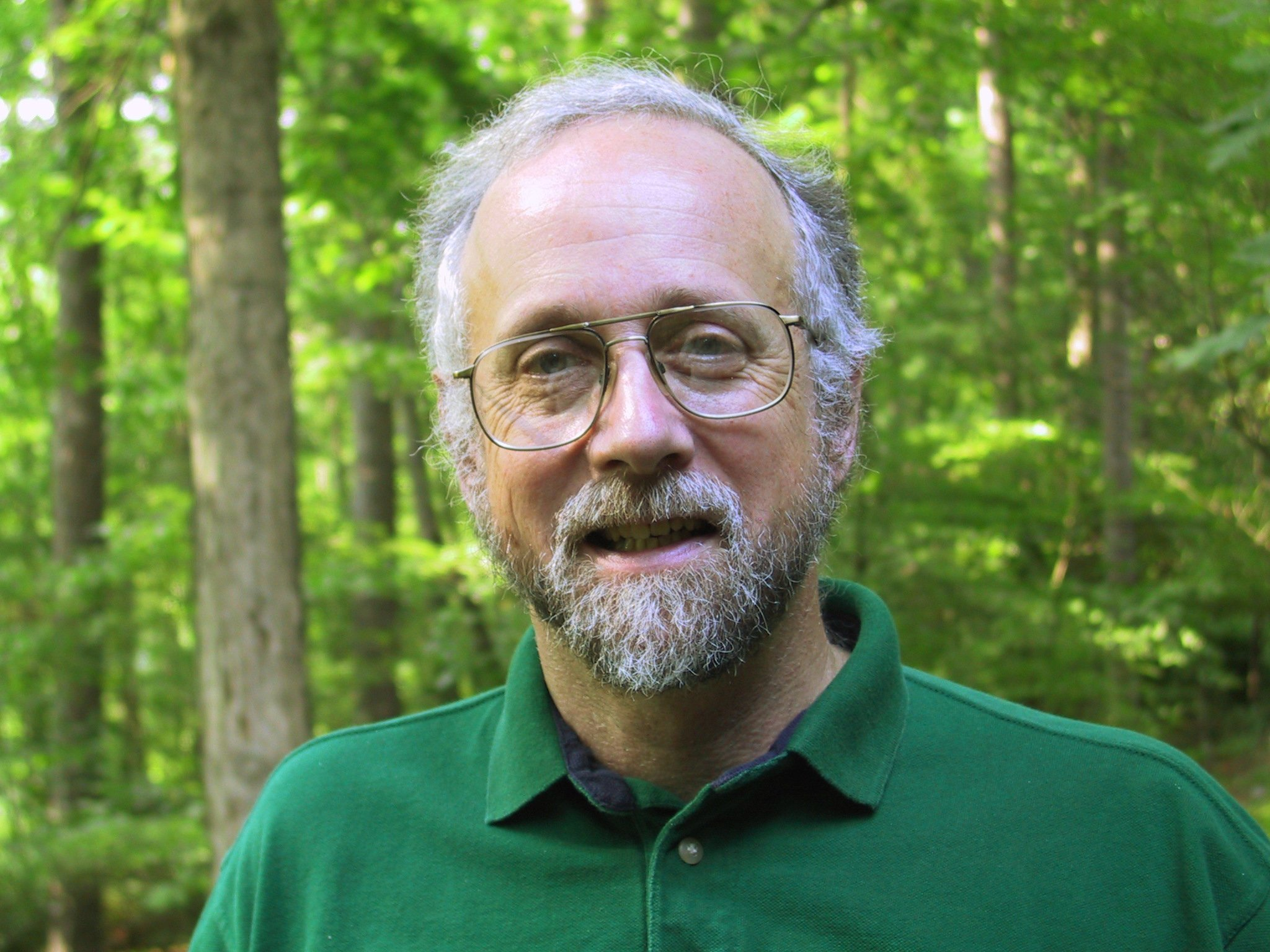
- Ron Arkin in 2001
- Born: 1949 (age 76–77); New York City, New York
- Education: University of Massachusetts Amherst; Stevens Institute of Technology; University of Michigan, Ann Arbor
- Scientific career
- Fields: Robotics
- Workplaces: Georgia Institute of Technology
- Doctoral advisor: Edward M. Riseman

Ronald Craig Arkin (born 1949) is an American roboticist and roboethicist, and a Regents' Professor in the School of Interactive Computing, College of Computing at the Georgia Institute of Technology. He is known for the motor schema technique in robot navigation and for his book Behavior-Based Robotics.

== Biography ==
=== Education ===
Ronald Arkin received a B.S. from the University of Michigan, Ann Arbor in 1971 and an M.S. from the Stevens Institute of Technology in 1977. He was a faculty member of Hawthorne College in Antrim, New Hampshire from 1977 to 1989, serving as the Computer Science Depart Chair from 1986 to 1989. In 1985, he joined the Laboratory for Perceptual Robotics and VISIONS groups at the University of Massachusetts Amherst, and received a Ph.D. in 1987. His doctoral thesis Towards Cosmopolitan Robots: Intelligent Navigation in Extended Man-Made Environments was supervised by Edward M. Riseman.

=== Career ===
Shortly after receiving his Ph.D., Ronald Arkin joined the School of Information and Computer Science (now College of Computing) at the Georgia Institute of Technology and founded the Mobile Robot Laboratory. He became a Regents' Professor in 2002 and was the first person to hold such honor in the College of Computing's history. From August 1997 to August 1998, Arkin was a STINT Visiting Professor at the Centre for Autonomous Systems, Royal Institute of Technology, Stockholm, Sweden. He served as the Sabbatical Chair for the Sony Intelligence Dynamics Laboratory, Tokyo, Japan, from June 2005 to October 2005, and was also a member of the Laboratory for analysis and architecture of systems at the Centre National de la Recherche Scientifique, Toulouse, France.

In 2006, the United States Department of Defense contracted Arkin to conduct a study to determine if military robots could be made to operate ethically. The goal is to create a robot with an "artificial conscience" such that, for example, it might refrain from firing weaponry when children were detected, or to even understand the laws of war and apply them in battle. “My intention in designing this is that robots will make less mistakes—hopefully far less mistakes—than humans do in the battlefield,” Arkin says.

== Research ==
- Mobile robots and unmanned aerial vehicles
- Behavior-based reactive control
- Action-oriented perception
- Hybrid deliberative/reactive software architectures
- Robot survivability
- Multiagent robotic systems
- Biorobotics
- Human-robot interaction
- Roboethics
- Learning in autonomous systems.

== Selected works ==
=== Books ===
- Arkin, Ronald C. (1998). Behavior-based robotics. Intelligent robots and autonomous agents. MIT Press. ISBN 978-0-262-01165-5.
- Arkin, Ronald C. (1987). Towards Cosmopolitan Robots: Intelligent Navigation in Extended Man-made Environments (Thesis). University of Massachusetts Amherst. hdl:1853/23031 – via Georgia Institute of Technology.

=== Papers ===
- Arkin, Ronald C. (1989). "Motor Schema — Based Mobile Robot Navigation". The International Journal of Robotics Research. 8 (4): 92–112. Bibcode:1989IJRR....8...92A. doi:10.1177/027836498900800406. ISSN 0278-3649.
- Balch, T.; Arkin, R. C. (1998). "Behavior-based formation control for multirobot teams". IEEE Transactions on Robotics and Automation. 14 (6): 926–939. Bibcode:1998ITRA...14..926B. doi:10.1109/70.736776.
- Balch, Tucker; Arkin, Ronald C. (1994). "Communication in reactive multiagent robotic systems". Autonomous Robots. 1 (1): 27–52. doi:10.1007/BF00735341. ISSN 0929-5593.
