= Data-Pop Alliance =

American think tank

- Formation: 2014
- Type: Think Tank
- Location: New York City
- Key people: Emmanuel Letouzé, Patrick Vinck, Alex "Sandy" Pentland
- Affiliations: Harvard Humanitarian Initiative, MIT Media Lab, Overseas Development Institute, Flowminder
- Website: http://datapopalliance.org/

Data-Pop Alliance is a non-profit think tank founded by the Harvard Humanitarian Initiative, MIT Media Lab and the Overseas Development Institute. Emmanuel Letouzé is the Director and Co-Founder and Alex Pentland is Academic Director. Its research areas includes public policy, inequality, privacy, crime, climate change and human rights.

Data-Pop Alliance is a partner for the United Nations Global Partnership for Sustainable Development Data and the Sustainable Development Learning & Training Course Partnerships. In addition, it is a partner of the United Nations System Staff College in the context of Agenda 2030.

From 2014 to 2020, Data-Pop Alliance was hosted by ThoughtWorks in New York City. In 2018, it opened a regional office in Mexico City and in 2021, a regional office in Dakar, Senegal. Nuria Oliver serves as Data-Pop Alliance's Chief Data Scientist. Data-Pop Alliance currently operates projects in over 20 countries, with staff located in Latin America, the MENA region, and Europe.
