= Blink Home =

Home automation company

Immedia Semiconductor LLC
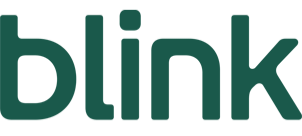
- Company type: Subsidiary
- Industry: Home security
- Founded: October 20, 2009; 16 years ago
- Founders: Peter Besen; Don Shulsinger; Dan Grunberg; Stephen Gordon; Doug Chin
- Headquarters: Andover, Massachusetts
- Products: Home security cameras, video doorbells
- Parent: Amazon (2017–present)
- Website: blinkforhome.com

Immedia Semiconductor LLC, doing business as Blink, is an American home automation company which produces home security cameras. The company was founded in 2009 by Peter Besen, Don Shulsinger, Dan Grunberg, Stephen Gordon, and Doug Chin. The company was initially started as Immedia Semiconductor Inc in 2009, but pivoted into a consumer electronics company. In July 2014, the company had a Kickstarter campaign for their indoor security camera, which raised over US$1 million. Subsequently, Blink later announced an outdoor security camera, home security system, and video doorbell.

Amazon announced in December 2017 that they had acquired the company. Immedia Semiconductor, LLC continues to operate as an independent subsidiary. It is anticipated that Blink's technology will be used for the Amazon Key service.

In December 2019, Amazon rolled out patches in response to research citing vulnerabilities in the Blink XT2 security camera systems found by vulnerability detection firm Tenable.

Most Blink products are made in China, while others are made in Malaysia by IoT Manufacturing Sdn Bhd.

== Products ==
=== Blink Video Doorbell ===
The blink video doorbell is a wirelessly connected smart device that allows video and audio to be viewed via another device. It works similarly to the Ring doorbell, including in its ability to connect to Amazon Alexa and an offering of a "plus" subscription, which allows greater cloud storage capacity and syncing of multiple devices.

=== Blink Dog Camera ===
The Blink Dog Camera is a smart device designed to provide pet owners with a method of monitoring their pets when the owners are not at home. The camera contains high-definition 1080p video and night vision capabilities.
