= P. Anandan =

Indian computer scientist and businessman

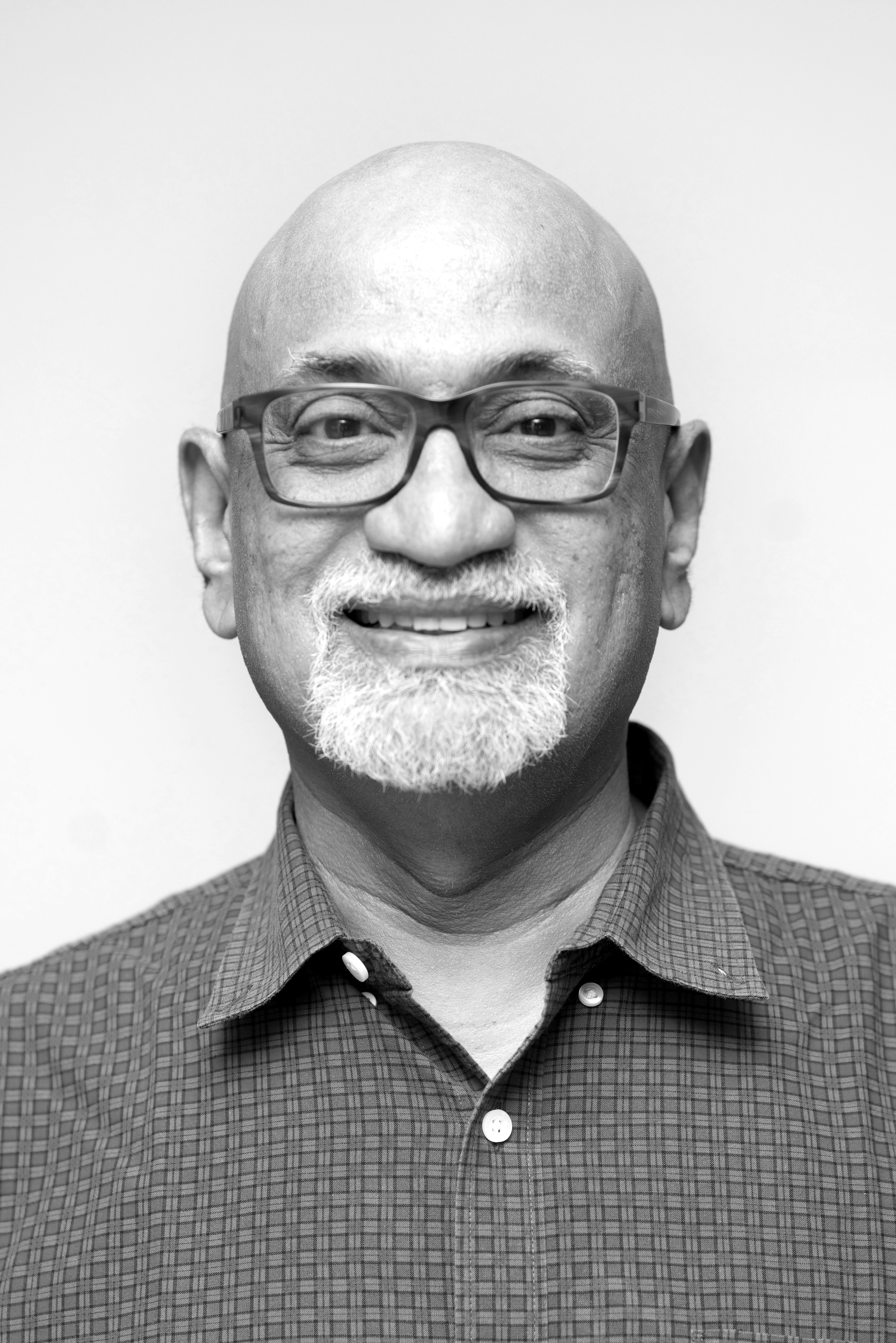
- Born: Madras, India
- Education: Indian Institute of Technology Madras (B.Tech, Electrical engineering); University of Nebraska–Lincoln (Masters in Computer Science); University of Massachusetts, Amherst (PhD in Computer Science)
- Known for: Computer Vision; Artificial Intelligence; Computer Graphics; Machine Learning
- Awards: Distinguished Alumni award, University of Massachusetts, Amherst (2006); Alumni award, IIT Madras (2010); Distinguished Scientist, Microsoft Research (2010); Hall of Computing, University of Nebraska (2010), University of Nebraska
- Scientific career
- Fields: Computer Science
- Thesis: Measuring Visual Motion from Image Sequences (1987)
- Doctoral advisor: Prof. Edward Riseman and Alan Hanson (Umass)
- Doctoral students: Michael J. Black

Padmanabhan Anandan is the former CEO of Wadhwani Institute for Artificial Intelligence, an independent not-for-profit Research institute focused on developing artificial intelligence based applications for social good. He was formerly vice president for research at Adobe Systems and prior to that a distinguished scientist and managing director of Microsoft Research. He was managing director at Microsoft Research India, which he founded in January 2005 in Bangalore. He joined Microsoft Research in Redmond, Washington in 1997, where he founded and built the Interactive Visual Media group. He was also previously a professor of Computer Science at Yale University.

== Education ==
Anandan holds an undergraduate degree in electrical engineering from the Indian Institute of Technology Madras, a master of science in computer science from the University of Nebraska–Lincoln, and a Ph.D. in computer science from the University of Massachusetts, Amherst.

== Career ==
Anandan's research work has been in computer vision, in the area of visual motion analysis, video surveillance and 3D scene modeling from images and video. He has published over 60 papers in leading journals and conferences, leading to several awards and honors. His own papers published in 1987 and 1991 on these topics as well as his joint paper with his student Michael Black are essential reading in many computer-vision curricula. He has over 17,000 citations by other researchers in the field of computer vision. The "Black and Anandan" method helped popularize robust statistics in computer vision. This was facilitated by several papers that connected robust penalty functions to classical "line processes" used in Markov Random Fields (MRFs) at the time.

His research has been used in real world applications in entertainment (movies and games), defense and civilian security. The “Black and Anandan” optical flow algorithm has been widely used, for example, in special effects. The method was used to compute optical flow for the painterly effects in What Dreams May Come, Prince of Egypt and for registering 3D face scans in The Matrix Reloaded.

Anandan assumed consecutive posts at Yale University, Sarnoff Corporation and Microsoft Research (MSR). At Yale, he was a founding member of the computer-vision research group. At Sarnoff, he led the video information processing group that invented "video mosaics". Based on a white paper he wrote and with the help of the research community, the US Defense Research Projects Agency started the Video Surveillance and Monitoring research program which funded research at Carnegie Mellon University, MIT and other major research universities. Many of the techniques such as mosaics and moving object detection (and tracking) that were pioneered in the VSAM program and at Sarnoff are now part of various defense and civilian video surveillance and security systems, and several new companies such as ObjectVideo have been formed that use these technologies.

At Microsoft Research in Redmond, Anandan helped build one of the leading computer vision research teams in the world. He established the Microsoft Research India laboratory in Bangalore, in January 2005. Anandan has often spoken on research, innovation and technology at forums hosted by organizations such as the Confederation of Indian Industry and the Federation of Indian Chambers of Commerce and Industry, and also by the media. He was part of the working group constituted by the 12th Planning Commission, Government of India, to make recommendations on India's higher education policy. Anandan was on the founding board of governors of IIIT Delhi and the board of Governors of IIT Madras

== Honors and recognition ==
- Distinguished Alumni award, University of Massachusetts, Amherst (2006)
- Alumni award, IIT Madras (2010)
- Microsoft Distinguished Scientist,(2010)
- Microsoft Emeritus Researcher(2020)
- Hall of Computing, University of Nebraska (2010), University of Nebraska

== See also ==
- VinFuture
