= Nada Lavrač =

Slovenian computer scientist

Nada Lavrač (born 1953) is a Slovenian computer scientist, the former head of the Department of Knowledge Technologies of the Jožef Stefan Institute in Ljubljana. Her research has involved expert systems, logic programming, and rule induction in data mining, especially for applications in medicine.

== Education and career ==
Lavrač studied technical mathematics at the University of Ljubljana, earning a bachelor's degree in 1978. She returned to the University of Ljubljana for a 1984 master's degree in computer science, and went to the University of Maribor for graduate study in technical sciences, completing her Ph.D. in 1990.

Lavrač worked for ten years as a lecturer at the University of Klagenfurt in Austria, and for five years at the University of Bristol in England. She joined the Jožef Stefan Institute as a postdoctoral researcher in 1993. In 2004 she was named head of the Department of Knowledge Technologies, also becoming a full professor of the University of Ljubljana, the Jožef Stefan International Postgraduate School, and the University of Nova Gorica.

After stepping down as head of department, she has continued at the Jožef Stefan Institute as a research councilor in the Department of Knowledge Technologies. She also retains her position at Nova Gorica, and has taught in a master's program on statistics and network analysis at the Higher School of Economics in Russia.

As of 2025, she holds position as a Scientific Councillor at the Faculty of Computer and Information Science at the University of Ljubljana. As of 2026, she is the Director of ELLIS Unit Slovenia and the co-Director of the ELLIS Multimodal Learning Systems Program.

== Books ==
Lavrač is the coauthor of books including:

- Prolog Through Examples: A Practical Programming Guide, with Igor Kononenko, Sigma, 1988
- Kardio: A Study in Deep and Qualitative Knowledge for Expert Systems, with Ivan Bratko and Igor Mozetič, MIT Press, 1989
- Inductive Logic Programming: Techniques and Applications, with Sašo Džeroski, Horwood, 1994
- Foundations of Rule Learning, with Johannes Fürnkranz and Dragan Gamberger, Springer, 2012
- Representation Learning: Propositionalization and Embeddings, with Vid Podpečan and Marko Robnik-Šikonja, Springer, 2021
- Bisociative Literature-Based Discovery: Methods with Tutorials in Python, with Bojan Cestnik and Andrej Kastrin, Springer, 2025

== Recognition ==
Lavrač was named an Ambassador of Science of the Republic of Slovenia in 1998. She is a Fellow of the European Association for Artificial Intelligence (formerly ECCAI), elected in 2007. In 2021 she was named an ELLIS Fellow by the European Laboratory for Learning and Intelligent Systems. In 2022 she was the recipient of a Zois Award of the government of Slovenia, for "outstanding scientific achievements in the field of machine learning ... on original data representation methods for efficient machine learning".
