= Liquavista =

Dutch company

Liquavista BV
- Founded: 2006; 20 years ago
- Fate: Dissolved
- Headquarters: The Netherlands
- Parent: Philips (2006-2010); Samsung Electronics (2010-2013); Amazon.com (2013-2018); LookGadgets.com (2020)
- Website: lookgadgets.com

Liquavista was a Dutch-based company founded in 2006 as a spin-off from Philips. Its research and development have included efforts to develop colour e-paper video screens that can work with or without a backlight using electrowetting technology. Liqavista began the final step in fully commercialising the technology in 2010, as it sent out SDKs to OEMs. Liquavista was reported to anticipate the first productions runs of its electrowetting display panel to come in 2013 but it did not happen.

In Dec. 2010, Samsung Electronics Co. Ltd acquired Liquavista B.V. for an undisclosed amount. On May 13, 2013, Amazon confirmed that it had acquired Liquavista from Samsung Electronics. In 2018, Amazon shut down Liquavista but did not indicate what happened to the technology. Later in September 2020, LookGadgets acquired the domain liquavista.com.
