= Shoefitr =

Shoefitr Inc. was a privately held multinational corporation that created software to help internet shoe shoppers find proper fitting footwear. Shoefitr was acquired by Amazon.com in 2015. Amazon uses Shoefitr's 3D scanning technology to acquire measurements of the inside of shoes and compare them.
