= TenMarks Education, Inc. =

American online math education company

- Company type: Private Company
- Industry: Educational software
- Founded: 2009
- Founder: Andrew Joseph; Rohit Agarwal
- Defunct: June 30, 2019
- Headquarters: Foster City, California
- Parent: Amazon
- Website: http://www.tenmarks.com

TenMarks Education, Inc. was an American company that provided personalized online math practice and enrichment programs for K-Algebra/Geometry using a structured approach of practice, on-demand hints, video lessons and real-time results.

Founded in 2009, TenMarks Education had offices in San Francisco, CA and Boston, MA (formerly Newton, MA)

Amazon acquired TenMarks in 2013 and discontinued TenMarks apps in 2019.

== Milestones ==
• June 2009: Launched Beta Program for Middle School Math (6th, 7th and 8th Grade), pilot at a Middle School in Boston
• July 2009: Launched the "Step Up" Math Summer Program for Middle Schoolers
• September 2009: Raised First Round of Angel Investment
• October 2009: TenMarks goes Live with Middle School Curriculum in Math
• December 2009: TenMarks Live for Elementary School - Math for Grades 3,4,5 added
• January 2010: TenMarks Rolled Out at two Schools to Measure Efficacy
• February 2010: TenMarks for High School Math Launched
• March 2010: TenMarks Placement Assessment Released to Help Automate Personalization of TenMarks Curriculum
• April 2010: TenMarks launches TeacherZone - A free library of math videos for teachers
• May 2010: TenMarks launches Summer Programs – Offering 19 different, customized step up and foundation programs for students to combat Summer Learning Loss • May 2010: TenMarks wins Dr. Toy The Best Vacation Product Award
• October 2013: Amazon acquires TenMarks to assist in pushing education through the kindle market.
• April 2018 - Amazon announced plans to stop offering TenMarks’ learning apps after June 30, 2019.
