= Carme Torras =

Spanish mathematician and computer scientist

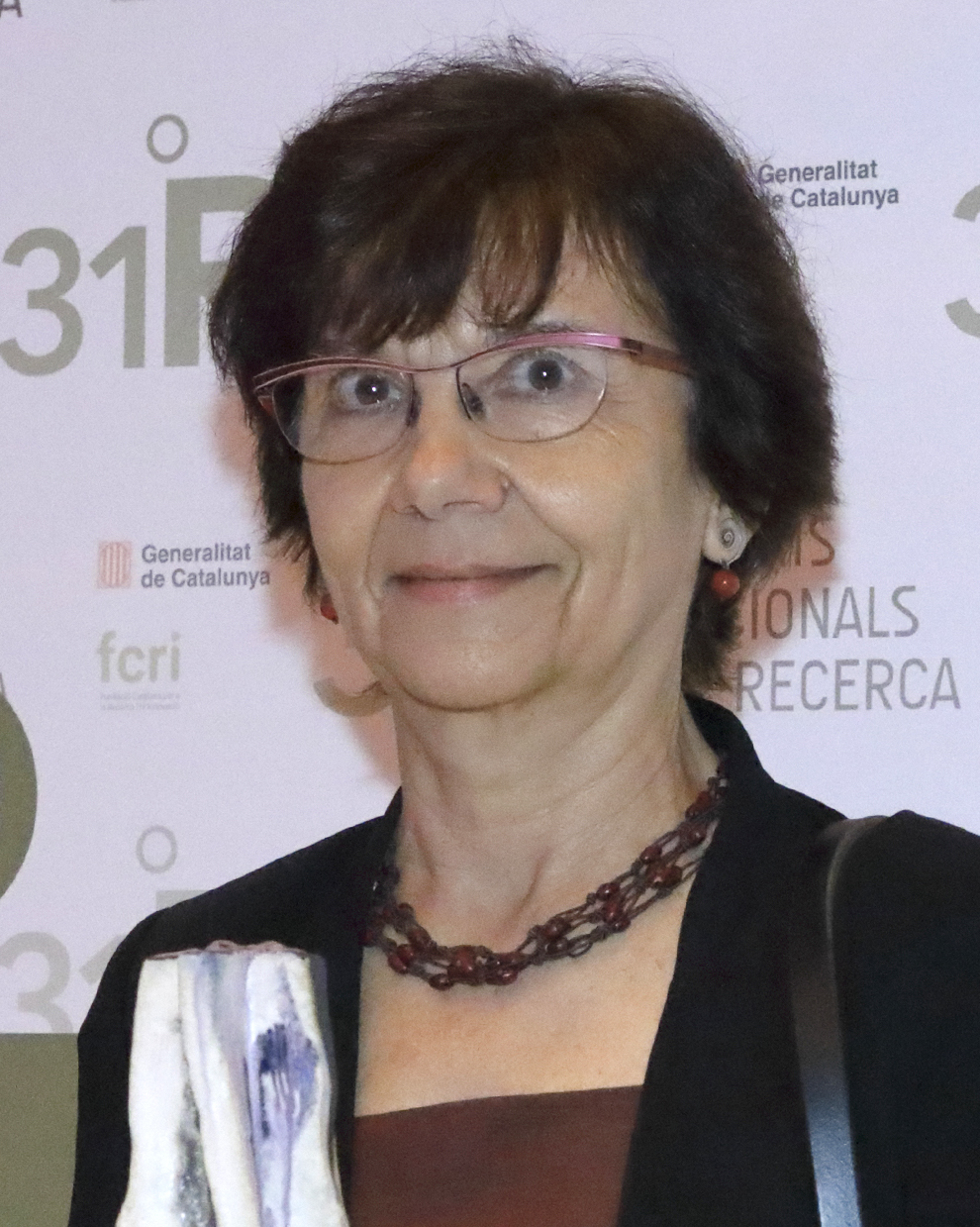
- Portrait of Carmen torras
- Born: 4 July 1956 (age 70)
- Education: University of Barcelona; University of Massachusetts; Polytechnic University of Catalonia
- Writing career
- Language: Catalan
- Genre: Fiction
- Subjects: Robotics, Artificial intelligence

Carme Torras Genís (born 4 July 1956) is a Spanish computer scientist who has contributed to research on robotics and artificial intelligence. A member of Academia Europaea since 2010, she writes technical works in English and fiction in Catalan.

== Biography ==
Torras studied mathematics at the University of Barcelona (master's 1978) and computer science at the University of Massachusetts (master's 1981). She also earned a Ph.D. in computer science from the Polytechnic University of Catalonia in 1984. Since 1991, she has been a research professor at the Spanish National Research Council.

On the literary front, in addition to her scientific works, Torras has written fiction. For her novel Pedres de toc she was awarded the Premio Primera Columna while her La mutació sentimental (2008), won the Premio Manuel de Pedrolo for science-fiction literature. In 2012, she published Miracles perversos.

== Selected publications ==
- Alenya, Guillem; Torras, Carme (2007). Robot Egomotion from the Deformation of Active Contours. INTECH Open Access Publisher. ISBN 978-3-86611-283-4.
- Torras, Carme (2012). Computer Vision: Theory and Industrial Applications. Springer Science & Business Media. pp. 3–. ISBN 978-3-642-48675-3.
- Torra i Genís, Carme (1985). Temporal-pattern learning in neural models. Springer-Verlag. ISBN 978-3-540-16046-5.

== Awards ==
- 2000: Narcis Monturiol Medal for scientific accomplishments
- 2007: Fellow of the European Coordinating Committee for Artificial Intelligence
- 2010: Member of the Academia Europaea
- 2013: Member of the Royal Academy of Sciences and Arts of Barcelona
