= Max Planck Institute for Intelligent Systems =

German research institute

Coordinates: 48°44′48″N 9°4′57″E

Max Planck Institute for Intelligent System (MPI-IS)
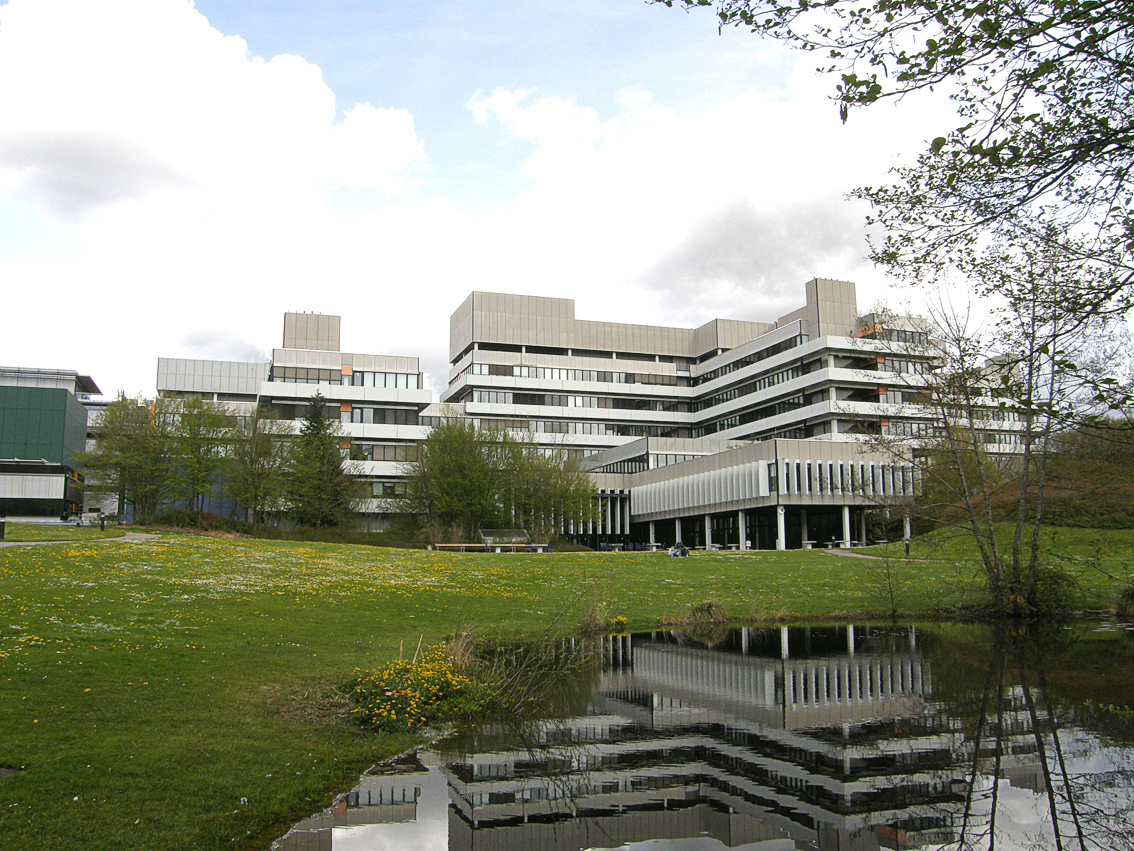
- Established: March 18, 2011; 15 years ago
- Address: Heisenbergstr. 3, 70569, Stuttgart. and Max-Planck-Ring 4, 72076 Tübingen
- Location: Germany
- Website: is.mpg.de/en/

Founded on 18 March 2011, the Max Planck Institute for Intelligent Systems (MPI-IS) is one of 84 Institutes of the Max Planck Society. With locations in Stuttgart and Tübingen, it combines interdisciplinary research in the growing field of intelligent systems. At MPI-IS, the scientists seek to advance the understanding of intelligent systems that perceive, learn, and interact and to use this knowledge to create innovative technologies that benefit society. They answer fundamental questions about intelligence and how to create intelligent behavior in machines and pioneer new solutions by combining research in hardware, software, and theory. With a strong commitment to interdisciplinary collaboration, the researchers seek to advance the field by exploring how computational, physical, and social intelligence can work together to solve complex real-world problems. Research at the institute is organized into six departments and numerous independent research groups, each with a different focus, led by a faculty of Directors, Group Leaders, and Max Planck Fellows.

== Research departments ==
- Empirical Inference (Bernhard Schölkopf), Tübingen
- Haptic Intelligence (Katherine Kuchenbecker), Stuttgart
- Perceiving Systems (Michael J. Black), Tübingen
- Robotic Materials, Physical Intelligence (Christoph Keplinger), Stuttgart
- Social Foundations of Computation (Moritz Hardt), Tübingen

== Current Research Groups ==
- AI Safety and Alignment (Maksym Andriushchenko), Tübingen
- Algorithms and Society (Celestine Mendler-Dünner), Tübingen
- Biomimetic Materials and Machines (Florian Hartmann), Stuttgart
- Computational Applied Mathematics & AI Lab (Konstantin Rusch), Tübingen
- Cooperative Machine Intelligence for People-Aligned Safe Systems (Sahar Abdelnabi), Tübingen
- Cyborg Robotics and Intelligent Sensing, (Antonia Georgopoulou), Stuttgart
- Deep Models and Optimization (Antonio Orvieto), Tübingen
- Embodied Social Interaction (Philipp Müller), Stuttgart
- Human Aspects of Machine Learning (Samira Samadi), Tübingen
- Learning and Dynamical Systems (Michael Mühlebach), Tübingen
- Neuromechanics of Movement (Janneke Schwane), Stuttgart
- Organizational Leadership and Diversity (Ksenia Keplinger), Stuttgart
- Robotic Composites and Compositions (Buse Aktaş), Stuttgart
- Robust Machine Learning (Wieland Brendel), Tübingen
- Safety- and Efficiency-Aligned Learning (Jonas Geiping), Tübingen
- Science and Probabilistic Intelligence (Maximilian Dax), Tübingen
- Wild, Efficient, and Innovative AI Lab (Shiwei Liu), Tübingen

== Current Max Planck Fellow Groups ==
- Intelligent Construction and Building Systems (Achim Menges),
- Interactive Learning (Andreas Krause), Tübingen/ETHZ

== Initiatives and networks ==
The Max Planck Institute for Intelligent Systems and ETH Zurich cooperate in the research field of "Learning Systems". For this purpose, they have founded the Max Planck ETH Center for Learning Systems (CLS). It is the first joint doctoral program of ETH Zurich and the Max Planck Society. Since the program was founded in 2015, 112 doctoral students and post-docs have been admitted as Fellows or Associated Fellows. CLS currently counts 50 directors, professors, and research group leaders among its members or associated members. In July 2019, the Max Planck Society and ETH Zurich agreed to extend the program's funding until 2025.

Since December 2016, the Max Planck Institute for Intelligent Systems is part of the research network Cyber Valley. Partners are the University of Stuttgart, the University of Tübingen, the Fraunhofer Gesellschaft, the State of Baden-Württemberg and seven industrial partners: Amazon, BMW Group, Daimler AG, IAV GmbH, Porsche AG, Robert Bosch GmbH, and ZF Friedrichshafen AG. Cyber Valley is also supported by the Christian Bürkert Foundation, the Gips-Schüle Foundation, the Vector Foundation, and the Carl Zeiss Foundation.

Founded in 2018, the European Laboratory for Learning and Intelligent Systems (ELLIS) aims to strengthen Europe's role in global AI research.

== See also ==
- Lists of open-source artificial intelligence software
- Comparison of deep learning software
- Comparison of machine learning software
