= Teachstreet =

Website that provided information on classes for students

TeachStreet, Inc.
- Type: Private
- Industry: Marketplace for online and local classes and experts
- Founded: April 20, 2008; 18 years ago
- Defunct: February 2012
- Headquarters: Seattle, WA
- Key people: Dave Schappell, Founder/CEO, Daryn Nakhuda, CTO
- Products: TeachStreet.com
- Number of employees: 11
- Website: www.teachstreet.com

TeachStreet, Inc. was a web site providing information to students on local and online classes and teachers including pricing information, location, and teacher background and training. It also provided online business management tools for teachers and schools. The site was free to students and included student reviews and teacher recommendations.

== History ==
TeachStreet launched its web site in Seattle on April 20, 2008, Portland on August 4, 2008, the San Francisco Bay Area on November 19, 2008 and was launched in 8 US Metros, with new listings being added in cities nationwide on a daily basis.

TeachStreet founder Dave Schappell was previously a VP of Marketing at JibJab and a Director of Product Management at Amazon.com. The company received $2.25 million in early stage funding from Madrona Venture Group, Bezos Expeditions and various individual investors. Initially, the Teachstreet web site was free to both students and teachers. The site moved to a paying service for teachers' listings in April 2010, with various levels of pricing plans available. However, the site remained free for students.

In February 2011, the launch of Google Panda (a change to Google's search results ranking algorithm) seriously affected traffic to the company's web site, and it never fully recovered. A year later, Teachstreet was bought by Amazon.com as a "talent acquisition" with its former employees transferring to AmazonLocal. Teachstreet.com closed down on 15 February 2012.
