= Stefan Roth =

German computer scientist

Stefan Roth (born March 13, 1977, in Mainz, Germany) is a German computer scientist, professor of computer science and dean of the department of computer science of the Technische Universität Darmstadt. He heads the Visual Inference Lab.

He is known for his research on computer vision and machine learning techniques in computer vision. His research focuses on recognition and tracking of people and objects, scene understanding, statistical image modeling and processing and motion modeling and prediction.

== Life ==
Roth studied computer science and engineering at the University of Mannheim, obtaining his diplom in 2001. The title of his thesis was "Analysis of a Deterministic Annealing Method for Graph Matching and Quadratic Assignment Problems in Computer Vision". He then studied computer science at Brown University, where he received his Master's degree. In 2007, he received his PhD in computer science under Michael Julian Black from the same institution. The title of his dissertation was "High-Order Markov Random Fields for Low-Level Vision". From 2007 to 2013 he was assistant professor and since 2013 professor at the department of computer science of the Technische Universität Darmstadt, where he heads the Visual Inference Lab. He is also dean of the department.

He is principal investigator of the ELLIS Unit at TU Darmstadt.

== Awards ==
In 2001, he received the Dean's Fellowship of Brown University. In 2005, he became associate member of Sigma Xi and received honorable mention for the Marr Prize at the International Conference on Computer Vision (ICCV). In 2010, Roth was awarded the Olympus Prize of the German Association for Pattern Recognition (DAGM), the highest German award for researchers in the areas of pattern recognition, image processing and computer vision. In 2012, he received the Heinz Maier-Leibnitz-Preis, the highest award for young researchers in Germany. In 2013, he received an ERC Starting Grant, the highest award of the European Union for young researchers, with a grant of 1.5 million euros for the project "Visual Learning and Inference in Joint Scene Models (VISLIM)". In 2019, he received an ERC Consolidator Grant. Roth is a member of the European Laboratory for Learning and Intelligent Systems (ELLIS).

== Publications ==
- Sun, Deqing; Roth, Stefan; Black, Michael J. (2010). "Secrets of optical flow estimation and their principles". 2010 IEEE Computer Society Conference on Computer Vision and Pattern Recognition. IEEE. pp. 2432–2439. doi:10.1109/cvpr.2010.5539939. ISBN 978-1-4244-6984-0.
- Baker, Simon; Scharstein, Daniel; Lewis, J. P.; Roth, Stefan; Black, Michael J.; Szeliski, Richard (30 November 2010). "A Database and Evaluation Methodology for Optical Flow". International Journal of Computer Vision. 92 (1). Springer Science and Business Media LLC: 1–31. doi:10.1007/s11263-010-0390-2. ISSN 0920-5691. S2CID 316800.
- Roth, S.; Black, M.J. (2005). "Fields of Experts: A Framework for Learning Image Priors". 2005 IEEE Computer Society Conference on Computer Vision and Pattern Recognition (CVPR'05). Vol. 2. IEEE. pp. 860–867. doi:10.1109/cvpr.2005.160. ISBN 0-7695-2372-2.
- Scharwächter, Timo; Enzweiler, Markus; Franke, Uwe; Roth, Stefan (2013). "Efficient Multi-cue Scene Segmentation". Lecture Notes in Computer Science. Berlin, Heidelberg: Springer Berlin Heidelberg. doi:10.1007/978-3-642-40602-7_46. ISBN 978-3-642-40601-0. ISSN 0302-9743.
- Gao, Qi; Roth, Stefan (2012). "How Well Do Filter-Based MRFs Model Natural Images?". Lecture Notes in Computer Science. Berlin, Heidelberg: Springer Berlin Heidelberg. doi:10.1007/978-3-642-32717-9_7. ISBN 978-3-642-32716-2. ISSN 0302-9743.
