= Ashford.com =

- Available in: English
- Founded: 1997; 29 years ago
- Headquarters: Tribeca, New York City, New York
- Industry: Retailer of luxury timepieces
- Parent: Luxi Group, LLC
- Website: www.ashford.com
- Commercial: Yes
- Launched: 1997; 29 years ago
- Current status: Active

Ashford.com is an online retailer of luxury watches and other luxury goods. The company is among the oldest online retailers with an initial launch in January 1997. At one point they were the largest luxury retailer online.

== History ==
Ashford is a retailer that went online in 1999 as NewWatch.com, in Houston, Texas under the guidance of Rob Shaw, James Whittcomb, and Sean McNamara G.G. In 1999, the company was listed on NASDAQ under the symbol ASFD and underwritten by Goldman Sachs. At launch, the site featured Microsoft's E-Wallet technology alongside Dell, CDW, SkyMall and a handful of other participants. In 1999, Ashford entered into a partnership with Amazon.com, giving Amazon approximately 16.6% of Ashford.com's outstanding common stock. Around this same time they acquired Timezone.com.

In 2000, Ashford acquired a $25,000,000 three-year loan from Congress Financial Corporation, which it used to acquire Jasmin.com. In 2001, they acquired Guild.com, Watchnetwork.com and renewed their partnership with Amazon.com as well as entering into an agreement with eBay to sell outlet watches. Also in March, a promotion with Amazon led to an accounting conflict that ended in Ashford being fined due to non-compliance with GAAP policies.

In September 2001, Ashford was acquired by ecommerce service provider GSI Commerce (formerly Global Sports). Years later in 2003, it was sold to Odimo Inc. who then sold it to the current owner Luxi Group in 2007.

As of 2012, Ashford was ranked #323 on the Internet Retailer Top 500, placing it among the largest web merchants in the United States.

== Collection ==
Currently, Ashford carries watches and luxury items from Revue Thommen, Cartier, Movado, Breitling, Baume & Mercier, Ebel, Corum, Rado, International Watch Company (IWC) and other luxury watch brands.
