= Alex Pentland =

American academic and entrepreneur (born 1951)

Alex "Sandy" Pentland
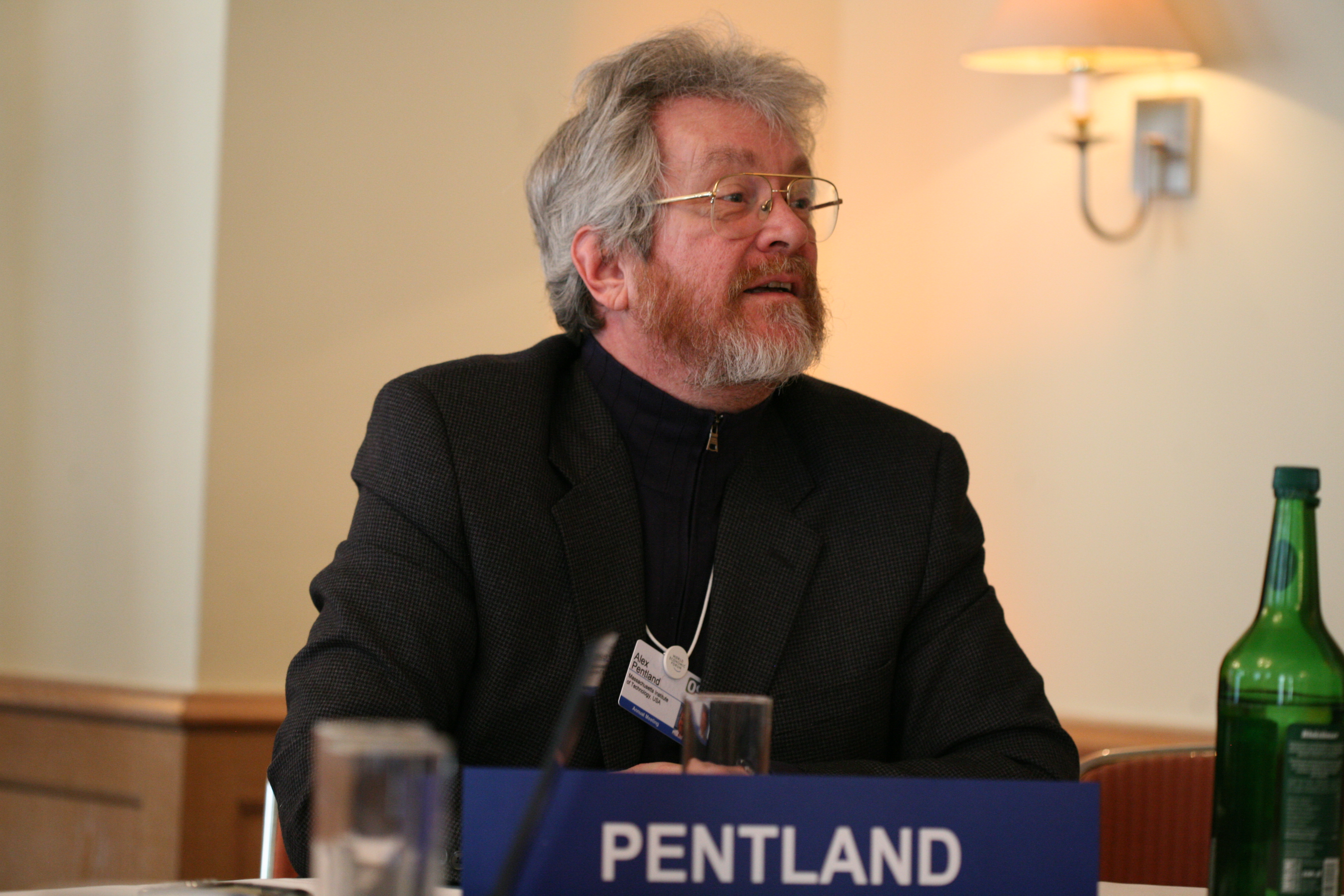
- Born: 1951 (age 74–75); Ann Arbor, Michigan, U.S.
- Education: University of Michigan; Massachusetts Institute of Technology
- Known for: Social physics, wearable computing, computational social science, computer vision
- Scientific career
- Workplaces: Stanford University, MIT
- Thesis: Visual Inference of Shape: Computation from Local Features (1982)
- Doctoral advisor: Whitman Richards
- Doctoral students: Deb Roy; Irfan Essa; Rosalind Picard; Trevor Darrell; Tanzeem Choudhury; Nathan Eagle

Alex Paul "Sandy" Pentland (born 1951) is an American computer scientist, HAI Fellow at Stanford, Toshiba Professor at MIT, and serial entrepreneur.

== Education ==
Pentland received his bachelor's degree from the University of Michigan, and his Ph.D. from Massachusetts Institute of Technology in 1982.

== Career ==
Pentland started as a lecturer at Stanford University in both computer science and psychology, and joined the MIT faculty in 1986, where he became academic head of the Media Laboratory and received the Toshiba Chair in Media Arts and Sciences, later joined the faculty of the MIT School of Engineering and the MIT Sloan School. He most recently became HAI Fellow at Stanford, leading Digital Democracy and Loyal AI Agents initiatives.

Pentland serves on the advisory boards of the Luxembourg Ministry of the Economy, the Abu Dhabi Investment Authority Lab; and formerly of the UN Global Partnership for Sustainable Development Data, Consumers Union, OECD and American Bar Association, AT&T, and several of the startup companies he has co-founded. He previously co-founded and co-directed the Media Lab Asia laboratories at the Indian Institutes of Technology and Strong Hospital's Center for Future Health.

Pentland is one of the most cited authors in computer science, with an h-index of 160.

He is a member of the U.S. National Academy of Engineering, co-led the World Economic Forum discussion in Davos that led to the EU privacy regulation GDPR, and was one of the UN Secretary General's "Data Revolutionaries" who helped forge the transparency and accountability mechanisms in the UN's Sustainable Development Goals.

Pentland founded MIT Connection Science, an MIT-wide program which pioneered computational social science, using big data and AI to better understand human society. He also founded the Trust::Data Alliance, an alliance of companies and nations building open-source software that makes AI and data safe, trusted and secure. He also founded the MIT Media Lab Entrepreneurship Program, which creates ventures to take cutting-edge technologies into the real world. He was academic director of the Data-Pop Alliance, and co-founder of Imagination In Action, which bring world-changing inventors together with leaders of governments and companies.

In 2011 Tim O’Reilly named him one of the world's seven most powerful data scientists, along with Larry Page, then CEO of Google, and the CTO of the Department of Health and Human Services. Recent invited keynotes include annual meetings of U.S. National Academy of Engineering, OECD, G20, World Bank, and JP Morgan.

Pentland's research focuses on next-gen AI, computational social science, and cybersecurity. His research helps people better understand the "physics" of their social environment, and helps individuals, companies and communities to reinvent themselves to be safer, more productive, and more creative. He has previously been a pioneer in wearable computing, ventures technology for developing nations, and image understanding. His research has been featured in Nature, Science, and Harvard Business Review, as well as being the focus of TV features on BBC World, Discover and Science channels.

Companies co-founded or incubated by Pentland's lab include the largest rural health care service delivery system in the world, the advertising arm of Alibaba, the identity authentication technology that powers India's digital identity system Aadhaar, and rural service outlets for India's largest payment solutions provider.

More recent companies include Ginger.io (mental health services), CogitoCorp.com (AI coaching for interaction management), SCRT.network (Web3 confidential smart contracts), Wise Systems (delivery planning and optimization), Sila Money (stable bank and stablecoin), Akoya (secure, privacy-preserving financial interactions), FortifID (digital identity), Alphabiome.ai (microbiome interventions for health), and Array Insights (federated medical data analytics).

Pentland, along with colleagues William J. Mitchell and Kent Larson at the Massachusetts Institute of Technology, are credited with first exploring the concept of a living laboratory. They argued that a living lab represents a user-centric research methodology for sensing, prototyping, validating and refining complex solutions in multiple and evolving real life contexts. Nowadays, several living lab descriptions and definitions are available from different sources.

== Publications ==
- Honest Signals (2010) describes research chosen as Harvard Business Review Breakthrough Idea of the Year.
- Social Physics (2015) describes research that won both the McKinsey Award from Harvard Business Review and the 40th Anniversary of the Internet Grand Challenge.
- Shared Wisdom (2025) describes how AI can be safely combined with human intelligence to create a more innovative, fair, and flourishing society.
