= Karl-Heinz Streibich =

German manager (born 1952)

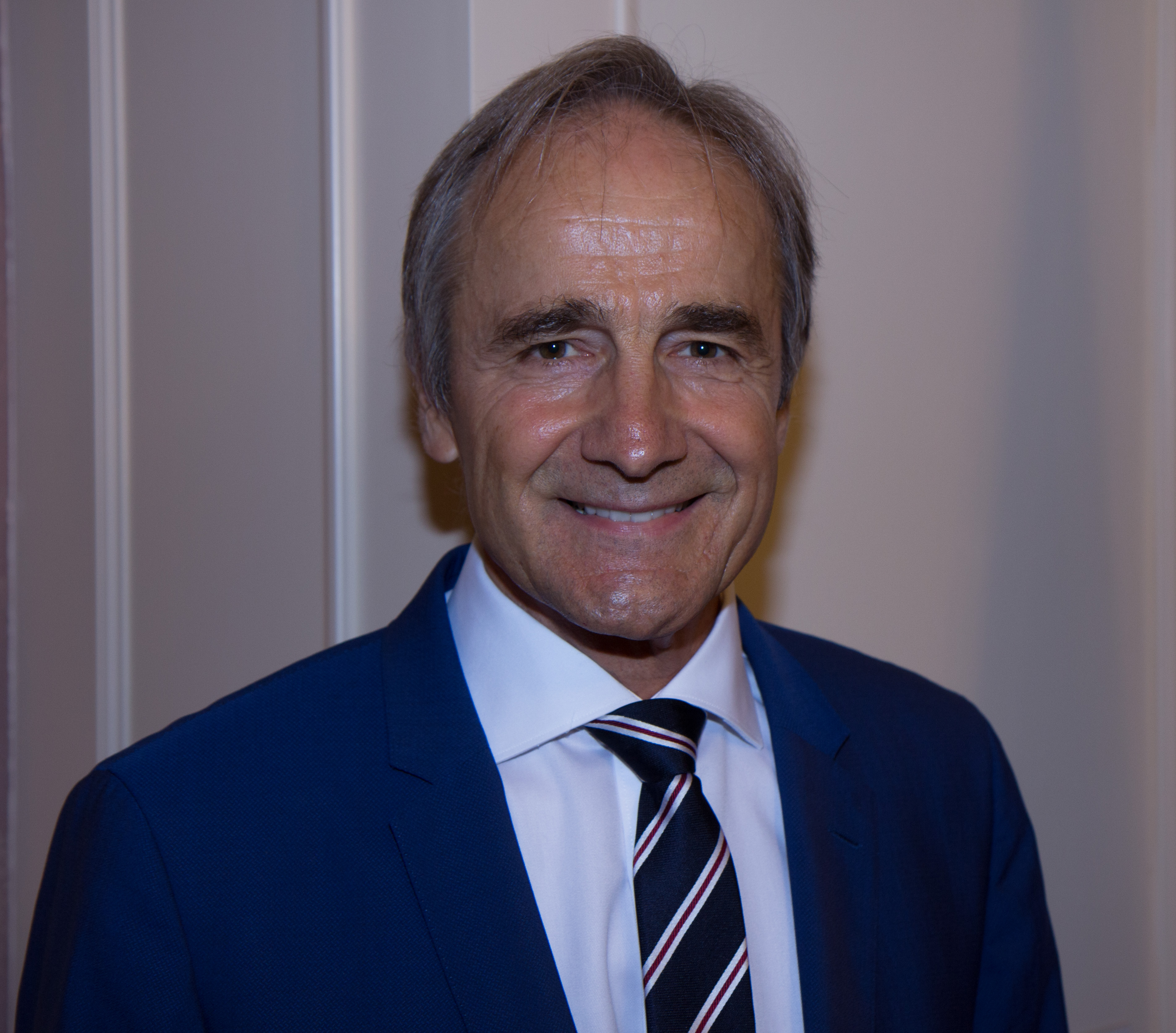
- Born: 1952 (age 73–74); Germany
- Education: Communications Engineering from Offenburg University
- Occupations: Chairman & CEO; Software AG (2003- 31 July 2018)

Karl-Heinz Streibich (born 1952) is a German manager who served as chairman of the executive board and chief executive officer of the Germany-based software company Software AG from 2003 until 2018. Prior to that he was deputy chairman and deputy chief executive officer of T-Systems

== Early life and education ==
Streibich was born in Germany. He holds a degree in communications engineering from the Offenburg University, Germany.

== Career ==
Streibich started his career in 1981 at Dow Chemical Company in Rheinmünster, Germany, as a software development engineer. Three years later he joined ITT Industries as product marketing manager then moved to ITT-SEL AG now Alcatel-Lucent as managing director of the PC business. He joined Daimler Benz AG in 1989, where he served several IT-related executive positions before serving as deputy chairman and deputy chief executive officer of Debis Systemhaus facilitating the merger with T-Systems between 2000 and 2002. He is a member of the supervisory board (Aufsichtsrat) at Deutsche Messe AG, and holds several honorary positions, including member of the presidency of the German IT Association BITKOM, co-chairman of the platform “Digital administration and public IT“ within the framework of the German Chancellor's IT summit, and he is a co-founder of the German Software Cluster of Excellence.

From 2003 until 2018 Streibich served as chairman of the executive board and chief executive officer of the Germany-based software company Software AG. In this capacity, he was also responsible for the company's corporate marketing, audit, processes & quality, legal affairs, and corporate communications. Under his leadership, Software AG acquired webMethods for $546 million in cash to add networking software to its product line.

Streibich is the author of the book entitled The Digital Enterprise, published in 2014.

== Other activities ==
=== Corporate boards ===
- Software AG, Member of the Supervisory Board (since 2020)
- Munich Re, Member of the Supervisory Board (since 2019)
- Siemens Healthineers, Member of the Supervisory Board (since 2018)
- Deutsche Telekom, Member of the Supervisory Board (since 2013)
- Dürr AG, Member of the Supervisory Board (2011-2020), Chairman of the Supervisory Board (2018-2020)
- Wittenstein, Member of the Supervisory Board (2017-2019)
- Deutsche Messe, Member of the Supervisory Board (2013-2017)

=== Non-profit organizations ===
- German Cancer Research Center (DKFZ), Member of the Advisory Council
- Senckenberg Nature Research Society, Member of the Board of Trustees
