= Alwin Walther =

German mathematician (1898–1967)

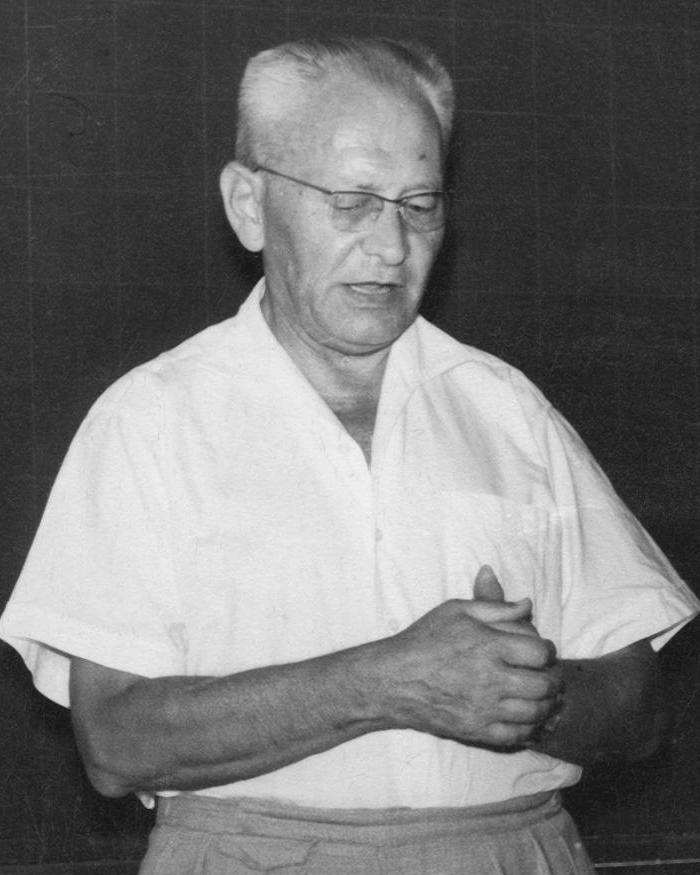
Alwin Oswald Walther, Darmstadt 1964 in his Institute for Practical Mathematics

Alwin Oswald Walther (6 May 1898 – 4 January 1967) was a German mathematician, engineer and professor. He is one of the pioneers of mechanical computing technology in Germany.

== Life ==
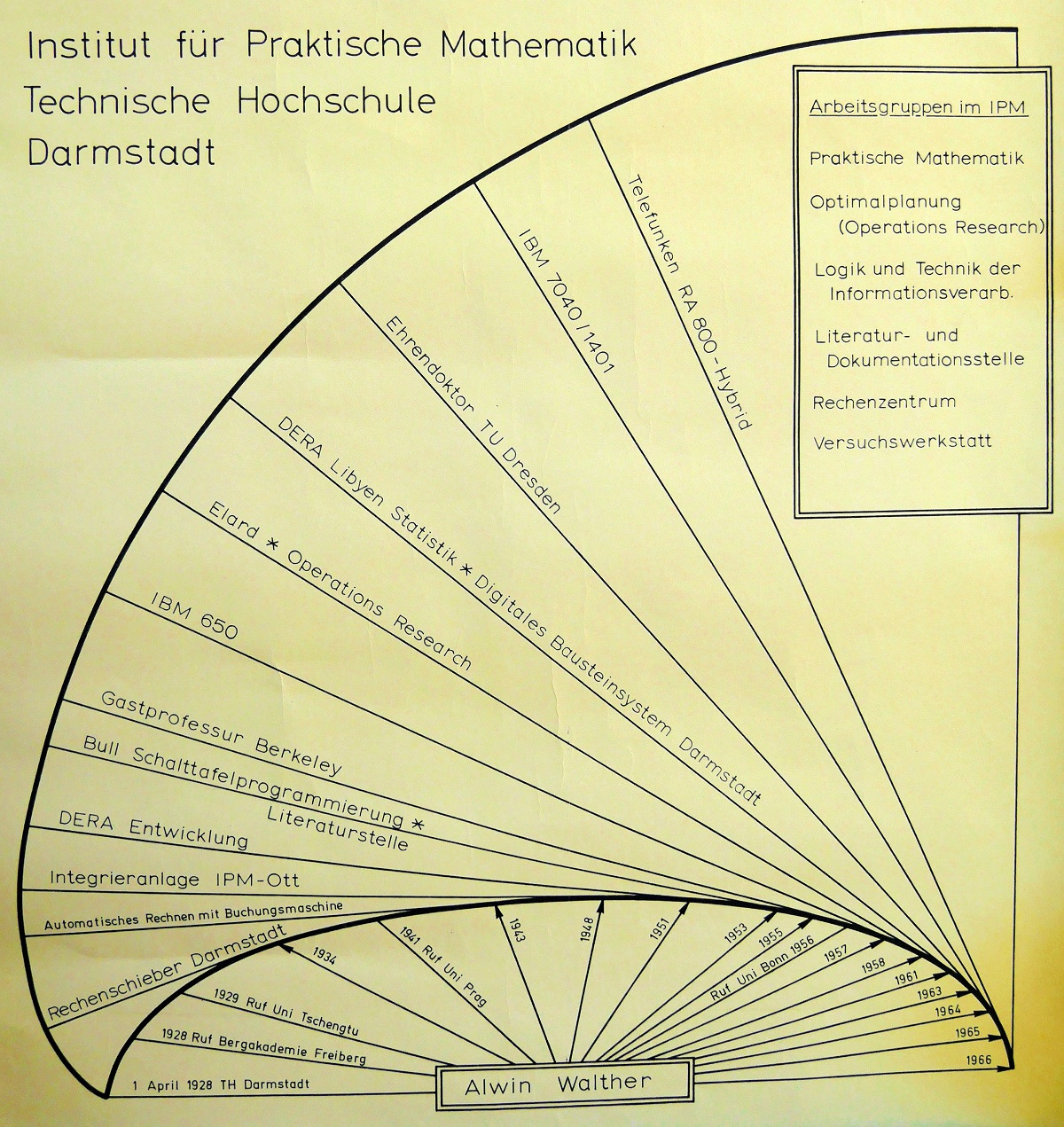
Memorial Journal for Alwin Walther

Alwin Walther was born in May 1898 in Reick near Dresden. From 1916 to 1919 Walther served his military service. He was wounded twice and received the Iron Cross 1st Class. From 1919 to 1922 he studied mathematics at the Technical University of Dresden and the University of Göttingen. In 1922, he received his doctorate to Dr. rer. tech. (today according to Dr.-Ing.) from the University of Göttingen under the supervision of Gerhard Kowalewski and Max Otto Lagally. From 1922 to 1928, he was assistant and senior Assistant to Richard Courant at the Mathematical Institute at the University of Göttingen. In 1924, he habilitated and became a Privatdozent. The year before, he stayed in Copenhagen for scientific purposes. From 1926 to 1927 he was a Rockefeller Fellow in Copenhagen and Stockholm. On 1 April 1928 Walther became a full professor of mathematics at the Technische Hochschule Darmstadt and director of the Institute for Applied Mathematics, which he built. In 1955, he was a visiting professor at the University of California, Berkeley.

Alwin Walther, Heinz Billing, Helmut Schreyer, Konrad Zuse and Alan Turing met in Göttingen in 1947. In the form of a colloquium, British experts (including John R. Womersley, Arthur Porter and Alan Turing) interviewed Walther, Billing, Schreyer and Zuse.

Walther retired on 30 September 1966. A few months later he died after a short illness at the age of 68 years in Darmstadt.

== Work ==
Walther attached great importance to questions of the practical application of mathematics. Alwin Walther was one of the first to adapt the mathematics to the requirements of the engineers. In the early 1930s he developed the slide rules "System Darmstadt", which was widely used in engineering.

On his initiative, the German Computing Centre in Darmstadt and the International Computing Centre in Rome were built.

Walter was a nominator in two nominations for the Nobel Prize in Physics, Peter Debye (1930) and Enrico Fermi (1936).

Peter Schnell, founder of Software AG, Rudolf Zurmühl and Helmut Hoelzer, the inventor and constructor of the world's first electronic analog computer, were his students.

From 1952 to 1955 he was chairman of the Gesellschaft für Angewandte Mathematik und Mechanik (GAMM). From 1958 he was board member of the Association for Computing Machinery (ACM) and from 1959 to 1962 he was vice president of the newly founded International Federation for Information Processing (IFIP).

Alwin Walther was active for many years in the Association of Friends of the Technische Universität Darmstadt. In March 1933 he became deputy secretary. In the following year, until the late 1940s, he was their treasurer. In 1950, the general assembly appointed him as honorary member of the Association.

== Institute for Applied Mathematics ==
In 1928, Alwin Walther built the Institute for Applied Mathematics at the Technische Hochschule Darmstadt. It was the first Institute for Applied Mathematics in Germany. The focus of the institute was on the development of electronic arithmetic. Already at the end of the thirties, he set up a computing station in his institute. The computing capacity was unique in Europe at the time. At the computing station two decades before the invention of programming languages, algorithms were tested and used successfully in the processing of problems from industry.

In Germany, the beginnings of computer science go back to the Institute for Applied Mathematics of the TH Darmstadt. In 1956, the first programming lectures and internships in Germany were offered at the TH Darmstadt.

The Institute for Applied Mathematics contributed to Zuse's Z4 by providing parts and components.

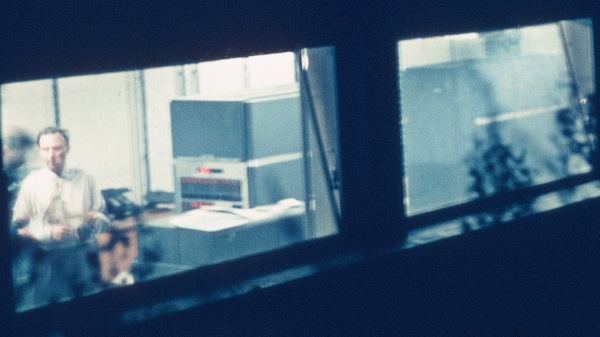
IBM 650 at Darmstadt (1957)

In 1951, the development of the digital electronic computing machine "Darmstädter Elektronischer Rechenautomat (DERA)" in tube technology was started. Around the same time, Walther procured a computer of the highest performance class, an IBM 650, for the TH Darmstadt. The TH Darmstadt was thus the first university in Germany to have a mainframe computer.

Due to the reputation that the TH Darmstadt had at the time in computer science research, the first international congress on computer science held in German-speaking countries took place in October 1955 at the TH Darmstadt.

== Awards ==
- 1950: Honorary member of the Association of Friends of the Technische Universität Darmstadt.
- 1959: Silver Medal of the City of Paris on the occasion of his preparation for a UNESCO Congress for Information Processing
- 1963: Silver merit plaque of the city Darmstadt
- 1963: Honorary doctorate from the TU Dresden

== Publications (selection) ==
- Einführung in die mathematische Behandlung naturwissenschaftlicher Fragen, Springer, Berlin, 1928.
- Unterricht und Forschung im Institut für Praktische Mathematik (IPM) der Technischen Hochschule Darmstadt, Der mathematische Unterricht in der Bundesrepublik Deutschland, Kapitel XVIII, S. 260–274.
- Fastperiodische Folgen und Potenzreihen mit fastperiodischen Koeffizienten; Abhandlungen aus dem Mathematischen Seminar der Universität Hamburg; 6,217–234 (1928).

== Alwin-Walther-Medal ==
From 1997 to 2010, the departments of computer science and mathematics at the Technische Universität Darmstadt awarded an Alwin-Walther-Medal for outstanding achievements, as well as for exceptional research and development work in the fields of computer science or applied mathematics.

== Literature ==
- Melanie Hanel: Normalität unter Ausnahmebedingungen. Die TH Darmstadt im Nationalsozialismus, Darmstadt 2014.
- Technische Universität Darmstadt: Technische Bildung in Darmstadt. Die Entwicklung der Technischen Hochschule 1836–1996, Volume 4, Darmstadt 1998.
- Wilhelm Barth: Alwin Walther – Praktische Mathematik und Computer an der THD, in: Technische Hochschule Darmstadt Jahrbuch 1978/79, Darmstadt, 1979, S. 29–34.
- Alwin Walther: Pionier des Wissenschaftlichen Rechnens, Wissenschaftliches Kolloquium anlässlich des hundertsten Geburtstages, 8. Mai 1998, Darmstadt 1999, published by Hans-Jürgen Hoffmann.
- Christa Wolf and Marianne Viefhaus: Verzeichnis der Hochschullehrer der TH Darmstadt, Darmstadt 1977.
