= John Bates (technology executive) =

British computer scientist

John Bates is a British computer scientist, and businessman. He has started several technology companies in the UK. Bates is CEO at ECM/DMS vendor Doxis.

== Education ==
Bates received his PhD in mobile and distributed computing (computer science) at the University of Cambridge computer laboratory in 1993. His PhD advisor was Jean Bacon.

== Career ==
Earlier on, he was a lecturer and Fellow of St Catharine's College, Cambridge until 2000. At Cambridge, he led several research projects, often in collaboration with industry, and designed and taught courses covering operating systems, distributed systems, software engineering and mobile computing.

Bates is an entrepreneur in the software industry, focusing on areas such as event-driven architectures, smart environments, business activity monitoring and Internet of Things.

In 2011 Wall Street and Technology magazine named him as one of the "10 innovators of the decade". In 2012, 2013, 2014 and 2015, Institutional Investor named him in its "Tech 50" of disruptive technologists.

Bates has published 2015 a book entitled Thingalytics: Smart Big Data for the Internet of Things.

=== Apama ===
Bates was co-founder, President and CTO of Apama, the pioneering streaming analytics company.

=== IONA Technologies ===
Bates has been CTO of IONA Technologies Limited since December 2009 and its Executive Vice President since 2011.

=== Terracotta, Inc ===
He has been CTO of Terracotta, Inc. since October 2013. He was a member of the Technology Council at C5 Capital Ltd.

=== Progress Software ===
He was a vice president of Progress Software since 3 May 2011 and served as its Divisional general manager. He was CTO of Progress Software Corp. from 2009 to 2013 and its Decision Analytics Business Line Leader from 2012 to 2013.

=== Software AG ===
He was the chief marketing officer at Software AG (alternate name Software Aktiengesellschaft) from 2014 to 2015. He was CTO of Intelligent Business Operations & Big Data at Software AG since October, 2013. He served as Head of Industry Solutions at Software AG.

=== PLAT.ONE Inc. ===
He served as CEO of PLAT.ONE Inc. from October, 2015 to February, 2017.

=== TestPlant / Eggplant ===
He has been the CEO of TestPlant Limited from February, 2017 to January, 2021.

=== Sage ===
Since May 2019 Bates is an Independent Non-Executive Director and is a member of the Remuneration Committee and the Nomination Committee.

=== Doxis ===
Bates was named CEO in January 2022.
