= Peter Schnell =

Peter Schnell may refer to:

- Peter Schnell (computer scientist) (born 1938)
- Peter Schnell (politician) (1935–2024)
