= Ellen Ivers-Tiffée =

German materials scientist

Ellen Ivers-Tiffée (born 1951) is a German materials scientist specializing in functional ceramics, especially focusing on energy storage and energy conversion. She is a KIT Distinguished Senior Fellow and former head of the Institute for Applied Materials – Materials for Electrical and Electronic Engineering (IAM-WET) of the Karlsruhe Institute of Technology.

== Education and career ==
Ivers-Tiffée was born in 1951 in Frankfurt. She received a diploma in 1975 in mineralogy and crystallography at Marburg University, and completed her Ph.D. in 1980 at the University of Erlangen–Nuremberg.

From 1980 until 1996 she worked in industry at the Siemens Corporate Research and Technology Center of Applied Materials Research. In 1996 she became a professor at the Karlsruhe Institute of Technology, where she held the Chair for Electrical Engineering and Information Technology and headed the Institute for Applied Materials – Materials for Electrical and Electronic Engineering (IAM-WET). Since 2019 she has been a KIT Distinguished Senior Fellow.

== Recognition ==
Ivers-Tiffée was elected to the German National Academy of Sciences Leopoldina in 2005, and to acatech, the German Academy of Science and Engineering, in 2007. She became a Fellow of the Electrochemical Society in 2015.
