= Lohmüller =

Lohmüller is a German surname.

== List of persons with the surname Lohmüller ==
- Martin Nicholas Lohmuller (1919-2017), American prelate of the Roman Catholic Church
- Otto Lohmüller (born 1943), German artist from Gengenbach, Baden-Württemberg
- Gyuri Lohmuller (born 1962), Romanian contemporary artist from Gataia, Romania

== See also ==
- Lohmühle
- Lohmiller
