= Cumulocity =

German software company

Cumulocity GmbH
- Company type: Private company
- Industry: AIoT, Enterprise software, cloud computing, SaaS, Industrial internet of things, Edge, Industrial AI
- Founded: 2012; 14 years ago
- Founders: Bernd Groß; Stefan Vaillant; Oliver Stache; Dr. André Eickler
- Headquarters: Düsseldorf, Germany
- Number of locations: Cumulocity is represented in over 20 countries worldwide. (2025)
- Area served: Worldwide
- Number of employees: 270+
- Website: cumulocity.com

Cumulocity GmbH is a German software company headquartered in Düsseldorf, Germany. It develops the Cumulocity software as a service, primarily for industrial Internet of Things (IIoT) applications.

== History ==
Cumulocity GmbH was founded in 2012 as a spin-off from Nokia Siemens Networks. In 2017, Software AG acquired the company. In January 2025, the management team completed a management buyout to reacquire the company, backed by private equity firms Schroders Capital, Verso Capital, and Avedon.

== Products ==
Cumulocity is a software as a service (SaaS) industrial Internet of Things (IIoT) platform. It has developed products for device connectivity, data management, and application development on cloud, on-premises, edge, and hybrid environments. It supports streaming analytics via the Apama engine.

The platform supports connectivity with standard IIoT protocols, including MQTT, OMA LWM2M, LPWAN, OPC Unified Architecture, Modbus, and CAN bus. Remote and bulk IoT device management functions include provisioning, configuration, monitoring, and software or firmware updates for device fleets.

For edge computing, Cumulocity contributes to the open-source project thin-edge.io and provides its own product Cumulocity Edge.

== Industry recognition ==
Cumulocity has been recognized by multiple organizations and rankings:

- From 2021 to 2025, Gartner’s Magic Quadrant for Global Industrial IoT Platforms positioned Cumulocity in the Leader quadrant annually.
- In Q3 2019, Forrester Research identified Cumulocity as a Leader in The Forrester Wave™: Industrial IoT Software Platforms.
