= Masters M80 hammer throw world record progression =

Masters M80 hammer throw world record progression is the progression of world record improvements of the hammer throw M80 division of Masters athletics. Records must be set in properly conducted, official competitions under the standing IAAF rules unless modified by World Masters Athletics. The M80 division consists of male athletes who have reached the age of 80 but have not yet reached the age of 85, so exactly from their 80th birthday to the day before their 85th birthday. The M80 division throws a 3 kg implement.

Key

Incomplete information Pending

Distance	Athlete	Nationality	Birthdate	Age	Location	Date
50.96 m	Heimo Viertbauer	Austria	6 November 1943	80 years, 328 days	Moosach	29 September 2024
50.69 m	Hermann Albrecht	Germany	6 April 1940	80 years, 103 days	Osnabrück	18 July 2020
49.53 m	Jose Maria Sanza Agreda	Spain	1 April 1935	80 years, 125 days	Lyon	4 August 2015
43.31 m	Zdeněk Benek	Czech Republic	80 years, 263 days	8 February 1931	Brno	29 October 2011
43.23 m	Richard Rzehak	Germany	13 October 1929	80 years, 4 days	Igersheim	17 October 2009
41.38 m	Manfred Rittweger	Germany	29 August 1927	80 years, 150 days	Erfurt	26 January 2008
38.78 m	Matti Järvinen	Finland	23 February 1926	80 years, 172 days	Toysa	14 August 2006
37.18 m	John Fraser	Australia	25 November 1914	81 years, 119 days	Murrumbeena	23 March 1996
36.76 m	Artur Fleischhauer	Germany	1913	80	Jena	3 May 1994
