= Nejila Parspour =

German electrical engineer

Nejila Parspour is a German electrical engineer known for her pioneering work in inductive charging. Other research interests of Parspour include "robotics, wind energy, and medical technology". She is a professor at the University of Stuttgart, where she heads the Institute of Electrical Energy Conversion.

== Education and career ==
Parspour received a diploma (the German equivalent of a master's degree) in 1991 from Technische Universität Berlin. She continued at TU Berlin for a 1995 doctorate, with the dissertation Fuzzy Logic Controlled Brushless D.C. Motor for a Heart Assist System.

After postdoctoral research at the University of California, Berkeley, she worked in industry for Yxlon International GmbH in Hamburg from 1996 to 2001. In 2001, she became a researcher in electrical engineering at the University of Bremen. She took a professorship at the University of Stuttgart in 2007, and has headed the Institute of Electrical Energy Conversion since 2011.

== Recognition ==
Parspour was elected to acatech, the German Academy of Science and Engineering, in 2025.
