= SAP Business Connector =

SAP Business Connector (also known as "SAP BC") is a re-branded version/restricted licence version of webMethods Integration Server provided by SAP as a middleware solution for their R/3 product. It was developed jointly by webMethods and SAP in a partnership which lasted from March 1999 to March 2002. webMethods contributed the Integration Server platform (including components like HTTP server & client, FTP server & client, SMTP/IMAP/POP3 client, XML processing tools, data mapping engine, job scheduler), while SAP contributed the components for RFC/tRFC, BAPI and IDoc communication and processing. These SAP components were bundled into an add-on package (called "SAP Adapter") that can be installed on top of the core Integration Server.

== History ==
Technically the SAP Business Connector is a webMethods Integration Server bundled with a pre-installed "SAP Adapter". SAP customers were able to license additional adapters from webMethods (like "Baan Adapter", "JD Edwards Adapter", "Oracle Adapter", "PeopleSoft Adapter", "Siebel Adapter", etc.). These adapters would run on a wM Integration Server and an SAP BC alike, as during that time (meaning from release 2.1 to 4.6) the core platform of both products was identical.

Then in March 2002 the partnership was discontinued and both companies started developing a successor version independently: SAP (who had acquired the full core Integration Server source code) started developing SAP BC 4.7, while webMethods began work on wM IS 6.0. Of course the component that changed most in SAP BC 4.7 was the "SAP Adapter", which got enhanced IDoc processing capabilities and performance improvements in the RFC communication layer. However, SAP also enhanced selected components of the core Integration Server, e.g. the job scheduler, the "Reverse Invoke" feature and the WmPartners package, which was completely redesigned. SAP tried to do these core enhancements in a backward compatible way, the only exception being the WmPartners package whose architecture had to be changed radically, because the original version had proved to be a serious performance bottleneck. Consequently, most webMethods adapters developed for wM IS 4.6 or wM IS 6.0 should still run on an SAP BC 4.7, with the exception of those adapters that have a tight coupling with the WmPartners package.

SAP BC 4.7 was released in June 2003. By that time SAP had already started development of its own integration/middleware product ("Exchange Message Broker" (XMB), later renamed to "Exchange Infrastructure" (SAP XI), then renamed to "Process Integration" (SAP PI) and nowadays called "Process Orchestration (SAP PO)), so the SAP Business Connector product line was frozen at version 4.7 between 2003 and 2007. Then, in summer 2007, it became more and more apparent, that the maintainability of SAP BC 4.7 was endangered, because most operating systems and Java VM versions, on which the BC depended, had gone out of maintenance. Therefore, development for another release (SAP BC 4.8) was started. This version was released in July 2008 and can be seen as a maintenance update to support newer JVMs and operating systems. See SAP note 1094412. However, as was the case with SAP BC 4.7, SAP again added a number of enhancements and performance improvements to some "wM core components" as well as to the "SAP components", most notably to the worker thread pool, the database adapter, the debugging, monitoring and tracing capabilities, the RFC and IDoc processing and the "Developer" tool. Finally in May 2021, another version SAP BC 4.8.1 was released by SAP, which again updates the server to recent JVMs and OSs and adds a number of new features, like support for Elliptic Curves in TLS, support for WebSocketRFC or support for high resolution displays for the "Developer" front-end.

In response to the split, webMethods has created the webMethods for SAP as an updated (version 6.0.1 onward) product for SAP customers wishing to continue using webMethods technology for middleware/B2B integration.

== Use cases and functionality ==
The role of the SAP Business Connector is to provide XML/web services type integration between SAP instances or from SAP to 3rd party systems/B2B (as the R/3 platform had no similar capabilities). Typical usecases include:

- Exchanging data between your application and your business partner's R/3 system via the internet (using HTTP(S), FTP or Email)
- Accessing data sources in the internet from within your SAP system (e.g. extracting data from online catalogs)
- Exchanging data with third party non-SAP systems inside or outside your corporate firewall (e.g. vendor or supplier systems, inhouse legacy systems)

== Differences between SAP Business Connector and webMethods Integration Server ==
- Web administration user interface was branded with the SAP water drop logo and different colour scheme for UI
- SAP BC comes with the "SAP Adapter", while on the wM IS it has to be installed separately
- The SAP Adapter inside the Business Connector is a shared development between SAP and webMethods. It was further enhanced in UI functionality (mainly for usability issues) by SAP after the end of the partnership.
- The official SAP Adapter inside the webMethods Integration Server was redeveloped for version 6.5 and uses different internal services to access SAP.
- The SAP BC is mainly a webMethods Integration Server 4.6 with minor changes up to SAP BC 4.8. (Releases 4.6; 4.7; 4.8)
- The webMethods Integration Server went from Release 4.6 straight to Release 6.0 and continued to evolve up to release 10 (Releases 6.0; 6.1, 6.5; 7.01; 7.1; 7.2; 8.0; 8.2;9.0;9.5;9.6;9.7;9.12;10)

== See also ==
- webMethods Integration Server
