= Peter Pagé =

German software pioneer (1939–2020)

Peter Pagé (8 July 1939 – 14 November 2020) was a German software pioneer. He joined Software AG in Darmstadt in 1971 as one of 6 employees and in 1975 became Vice President of Software AG. Page developed NATURAL as the first fourth-generation programming language, which was instrumental in Software AG's success.

== Life ==
Pagé was born in Arolsen/Waldeck. After graduating from a gymnasium in Wiesbaden and studying electrical engineering at the Technische Universität Darmstadt, he worked from 1966 to 1970 as a hardware developer for process computers at AEG in Seligenstadt, where, as project manager, he was responsible for the development and introduction of process computer systems, including the AEG 60-10 system.

In 1971, Pagé joined the Institute for Applied Information Processing (AIV), from which Software AG later emerged. From 1975, together with Margit Neumann, he developed the innovative software development environment Natural as the first fourth-generation programming language. NATURAL revolutionized the creation of applications on mainframe computers with a completely interactive way of working. This has resulted in significant increases in productivity and shorter implementation times for application solutions.

From 1977 Pagé as a member of the Vorstand, executive board, was responsible for marketing and sales as well as product development, where he largely built up the current product portfolio and adapted it to new market requirements in several cycles over many years. In 1990, he designed and implemented Entire Function Server Architecture (ENTIRE), the first service-oriented architecture (SOA). Pagé left the company in 1992 after differences with Peter Schnell over Software AG's future strategy when the company had about 4.500 employees worldwide.

In the following year, he received his doctorate from TU Berlin. The title of his PhD thesis was "Object-Oriented Software in Commercial Applications".

In 1994, Pagé joined Siemens Nixdorf AG as a member of the executive board and chief technology officer responsible for systems strategy and application software. In this function, he gave the company the "User Centered Computing"-architecture, which was in principle a service-oriented architecture (SOA), and reorganized their highly fragmented software offering.
