= Gengenbach Abbey =

Coordinates: 48°24′15″N 8°01′02″E

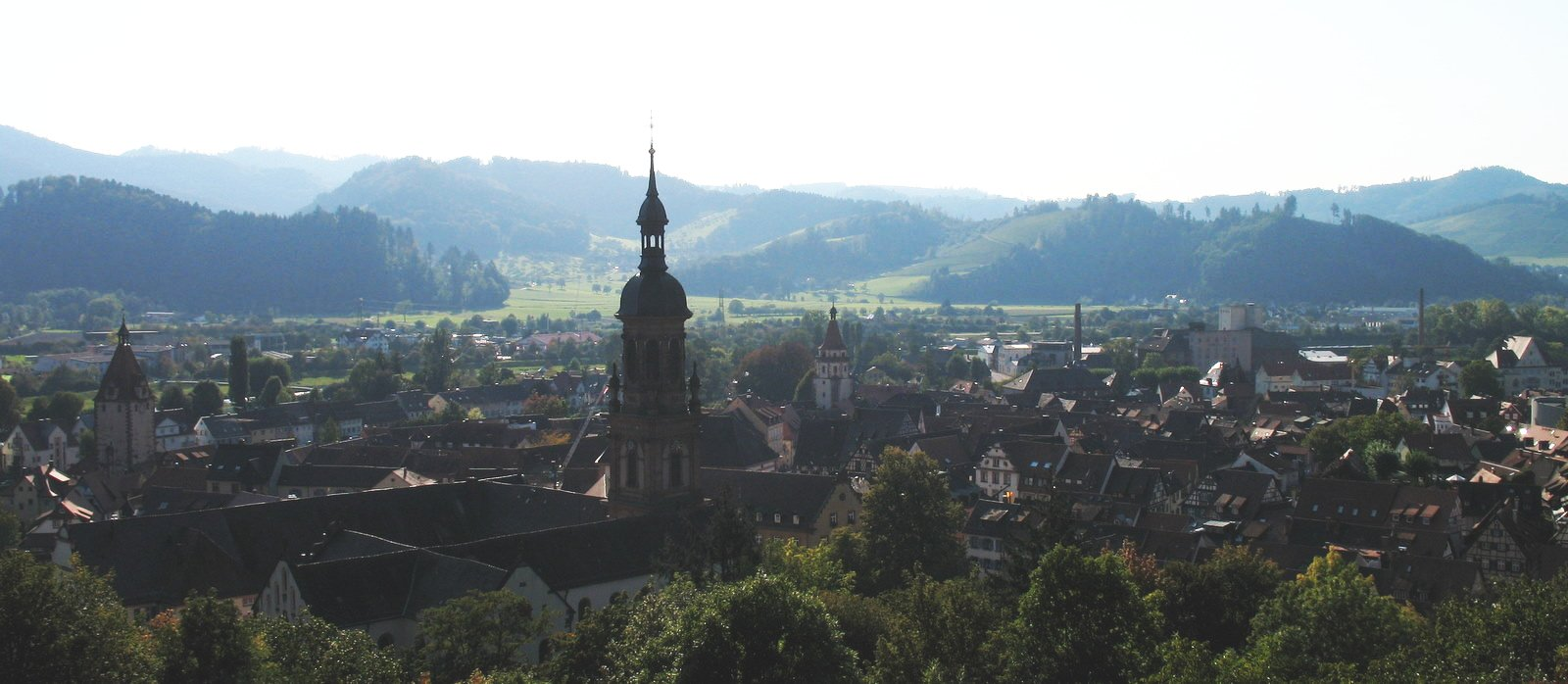
- Interactive map of Gengenbach Abbey

Monastery information
- Order: Benedictine
- Established: after 748

People
- Founder: Saint Pirmin

Site
- Location: Gengenbach

Gengenbach Abbey (German: Kloster Gengenbach) was a Benedictine monastery in Gengenbach in the district of Ortenau, Baden-Württemberg, Germany. It was an Imperial Abbey from the late Carolingian period to 1803.

== History ==
It was founded by Saint Pirmin sometime after 748 and settled by monks from Gorze Abbey. It enjoyed good relations with the Carolingian dynasty. Odilo, Duke of Bavaria was buried at Gengenbach. Chrodegang, bishop of Metz, encouraged the monks to adopt the Rule of Saint Benedict. A Latin school was established, and several of the abbés were noted for the learning. It became an Imperial abbey, with territorial independence.

In 1007, however, Emperor Henry II presented it to his newly founded Prince-Bishopric of Bamberg. Whilst situated within the Ortenauer Reichslandvogtei, under the protection of Rudolph of Habsburg (1273–91), the territory's protectors were an array of local lords: the Zähringen were followed in 1218 by the Staufen dukes of Swabia and in 1245 by the bishops of Strasbourg until the 1550s. These Vögte and confirmations of their rights — both Papal (1139, 1235, 1252, 1287) and Imperial (1309, 1331, 1516) — ensured the Abbey's continual independence.

Gengenbach was deeply embroiled in the Investiture Controversy and two of its abbots were driven out for supporting the Imperial rather than the Papal cause. Shortly after this, the abbey was involved by Abbot Theoger (1080–1139) of St. George's Abbey in the Black Forest and Bishop Otto of Bamberg in the Hirsauer Reform, during which the abbey church was demolished and rebuilt to the Hirsau model. Subsequently, it has been remodelled in the Gothic, Baroque and neo-Romanesque styles. A pipe organ with an historical eighteenth century the casing from the former abbey church is now in the Augustiner Museum in Freiburg im Breisgau.

Zell am Harmersbach was settled on territory owned by Gengenbach Abbey. During the 13th and 14th centuries, the abbey was instrumental in developing the town of Gengenbach to economic maturity. The abbey avoided further monastic reforms, and although in danger of suppression during the Reformation, survived that too. In 1525, Wilhelm von Fürstenberg and some town councilors sought to have the abbey dissolved. They took the abbot and some monks into custody, but nothing came of it.

In 1575 and 1580, the abbey applied for membership of the Imperial College of Prelates but was refused, due to concern about its Imperial immediacy and Vogtei; membership was eventually approved in 1645 but this approval was not implemented until 1751. The abbey was mediatized in the wake of the German Mediatisation of 1803, and shortly afterwards its territories were absorbed into the state of Baden. However, the abbey was left to function under the last abbot until 1807 when the Grand Duke ordered it secularized. By 1904 a normal school was in operation on the premises.

== Abbots of Gengenbach ==
- Rustenus (8th century)
- Burkhard, Leutfried, Cosman, Anselm, Gauthier, Volmar, Otho, Benno, Rado, Ammilo (?)
- Alfram (c. 820)
- Germunt (c. 826)
- Lando (c. 840)
- Dietrich I, Dietrich II, Gottfried I, Walther I, Walther II and others
- Reginald (before 1016–28)
- Rusten (1028–34)
- Berthold I ( –1052)
- Bruning ( –1065)
- Poppo ( –1071)
- Acelinus ( –1074)
- Ruotpert ( –1075)
- Willo ( –1085)
- Hugo I (1089, 1096)
- Friedrich I (before 1109–20)
- Gottfried II. (before 1140–62)
- Anselm ( –1147?)
- (anon.) ( –1173)
- Friedrich II ( –1182)
- Landofrid ( –1196)
- Salomon ( –1208)
- Gerbold (1210)
- Eggenhard ( –1218)
- Gottfried III (1218–37)
- Walther III (1237–48)
- Dietrich III (1248–1263?)
- Hugo II (1263?–1270?)
- Gottfried IV (1270?–1276)
- Berthold II (1276–97)
- Gottfried V (1296)
- Berthold III (1297–1300)
- Dietrich IV (1300–23)
- Albero (1323–24)
- Walther IV (1324–45)
- Berthold IV (1345–54)
- Lambert von Brunn (1354–74)
- Stephan von Wilsberg (1374–98)
- Konrad von Blumberg (1398–1415)
- Berthold V Mangolt-Venser (1416–24)
- Egenolf von Wartenberg (1424–53)
- Volzo von Neuneck (1454–61)
- Sigismund von Neuhausen (1461–75)
- Jakob von Bern (1475–93)
- Beatus II von Schauenburg (1493–1500)
- Konrad von Mülnheim (1500–07)
- Philipp von Eselsberg (1507–31)
- Melchior Horneck von Hornberg (1531–40)
- Friedrich von Keppenbach (1540–55)
- Gisbert Agricola (1556–86)
- Johann Ludiwig Sorg (1586–1605)
- Georg Breuning (1605–17)
- Johann Caspar Liesch (1617)
- Johann Demler (1617–26)
- Jakob Petri (1626–36)
- Erhard Marx (1636–38)
- Columban Meyer (1638–60)
- Roman Suttler (1660–80)
- Placidus Thalmann (1680–96)
- Augustinus Müller (1696–1726)
- Paulus Seeger (1726–43)
- Benedikt Rischer (1743–63)
- Jakob Trautwein (1763–92)
- Bernhard Maria Schwörer (1792–1803/07)

== Burials ==
- Odilo, Duke of Bavaria
