= JackBe =

Vendor of enterprise software

JackBe Corporation was a privately held vendor of enterprise mashup software for real-time intelligence applications. In August 2013 JackBe was acquired by Software AG.

JackBe's flagship product is platform called Presto, which is used for enterprise mashups, business management dashboards, and real-time intelligence applications.

== Products ==
JackBe’s main product, Presto, is an enterprise mashup platform. Presto provides real-time intelligence through functionality for self-service, on-demand data integration, and business dashboards.

JackBe launched a cloud computing-based version of its Presto product in March 2010. It is hosted on Amazon EC2. Jackbe launched Mashup Sites for SharePoint (MSS) in July 2010 Jackbe announced an Enterprise App Depot in 2010, as a platform for creating internal application directories. The Enterprise App Depot is aimed at non-developers (business users), allowing them to create new business applications and then share the applications with other users.

== See also ==
- Mashup (web application hybrid)
- EMML
- Real-time business intelligence
