= Wittenstein =

German technology manufacturer

Wittenstein SE
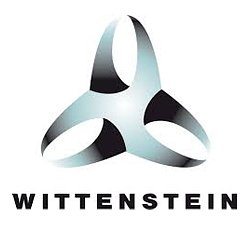
- Type: Societas Europaea
- Industry: Engineering, electronics, simulation technology
- Founded: 1949
- Headquarters: Igersheim, Germany
- Key people: Bertram Hoffmann (CEO), Erik Roßmeißl und Steffen Schwerd
- Products: Mechatronic drive technology
- Revenue: 519,1 million euros (2022/2023)
- Number of employees: 2,883 world (March 2023)
- Website: www.wittenstein.de/en-en/

Wittenstein SE (stylized as WITTENSTEIN) is a German manufacturer of planetary gearheads, gearing technology, complete electromechanical drive systems and AC servo systems and motors. These products are used, for example, in robotic systems, machine tools, packaging, conveyor systems and process technology, defence equipment, Formula One racing, paper and printing presses, nano technology, stage and lifting technology, the aerospace sector and offshore gas and oil extraction. The company's global headquarters is in Igersheim, Germany with North American headquarters in Bartlett, Illinois.

== Affiliated companies ==
- Wittenstein Alpha GmbH (until 30 June 2008 Alpha Getriebebau)
- Wittenstein Cyber Motor GmbH
- Wittenstein Galaxie GmbH
- Wittenstein Motion control GmbH
- Wittenstein Motion Control (North America HQ Bartlett, IL)
- Attocube Systems GmbH
- baramundi software GmbH
- Wittenstein High Integrity Systems

== History ==
The company was formed as Dewitta in 1949 by two entrepreneurs, Walter Wittenstein and Bruno Dähn, in Steinheim near Heidenheim (Baden-Württemberg). Using borrowed equipment, this small firm specialized in the manufacture of double chainstitch machines for glovemaking. The Steinheim premises soon become too cramped and so the company moved to Bad Mergentheim in 1952. The first production plant was a converted barracks beaf to Eissee lake, originally only intended as an interim solution. In 1963, lack of space forced Dewitta to relocate again – this time to Herrenwiesenstrasse in Igersheim.

With fewer and fewer women wearing gloves, sales of machines for making them slumped dramatically in the 1970s. Contract work and diversification into alternative products became increasingly critical factors as the company struggled through this difficult period and soon accounted for half the firm's total sales. Guns for steel nails, machines for filling and sealing tubes, equipment for packing sliced bread, etc. were among the many different products made in Igersheim.

At the same time, the way was paved for a new generation to take over the helm. Walter Wittenstein, the textile maker and machine builder, went into gradual retirement and was succeeded by his son, Dr. Manfred Wittenstein. Company founder Walter Wittenstein died in Igersheim in 1988. Shortly after joining the family firm in 1979, Manfred Wittenstein set to work modernising its production and product portfolio. In the search for market opportunities and adequate products with unique attributes, he quickly recognized the potential of low-backlash planetary gearheads.

The world's first planetary gearhead (the SP series) was unveiled at the Hanover Fair in 1983. The SP turned out to be so successful that alpha getriebebau was set up soon afterwards as an independent Wittenstein subsidiary. In 1984, alpha getriebebau GmbH was established as a cooperative venture of two SMEs (Bastian in Fellbach, just outside Stuttgart, and Wittenstein), with Manfred Bastian and Manfred Wittenstein as managing partners.

An assembly shop, warehouse and various office buildings were erected at the Herrenwiesenstrasse site in Igersheim, as a result of which floor space more than doubled. The workforce increased steadily in size too, and for the first time a large number of technicians and engineers were also recruited. alpha regularly recorded double-figure growth in turnover. The complete assembly side was transferred to Weikersheim in 1990. Forty staff on average worked there for six years before the company moved out for good in 1996. This period simultaneously marked the end of the sewing machine era and the last Dewitta was assembled while still in Weikersheim. The entire sewing machine business was subsequently sold off, including all spare parts, milling machines and other equipment.

In the early 1990s, Wittenstein began to expand internationally. alpha réducteurs Sarl was set up in Paris (France) as the first foreign subsidiary, followed not long afterwards by alpha getriebe Ltd., Tokyo (Japan). The first manufacturing headquarters outside of Germany was founded in 1992 in North America. By 2007, the Group had eleven subsidiaries outside Germany, with exports accounting for over 60% of turnover. The creation of Wittenstein motion control GmbH in 1992 spearheaded the Group's transition to a provider of electromechanical servo actuators and actuator systems. More new Business Units were successively added over the next few years, such as Wittenstein intens and Wittenstein cyber motor in 1999.

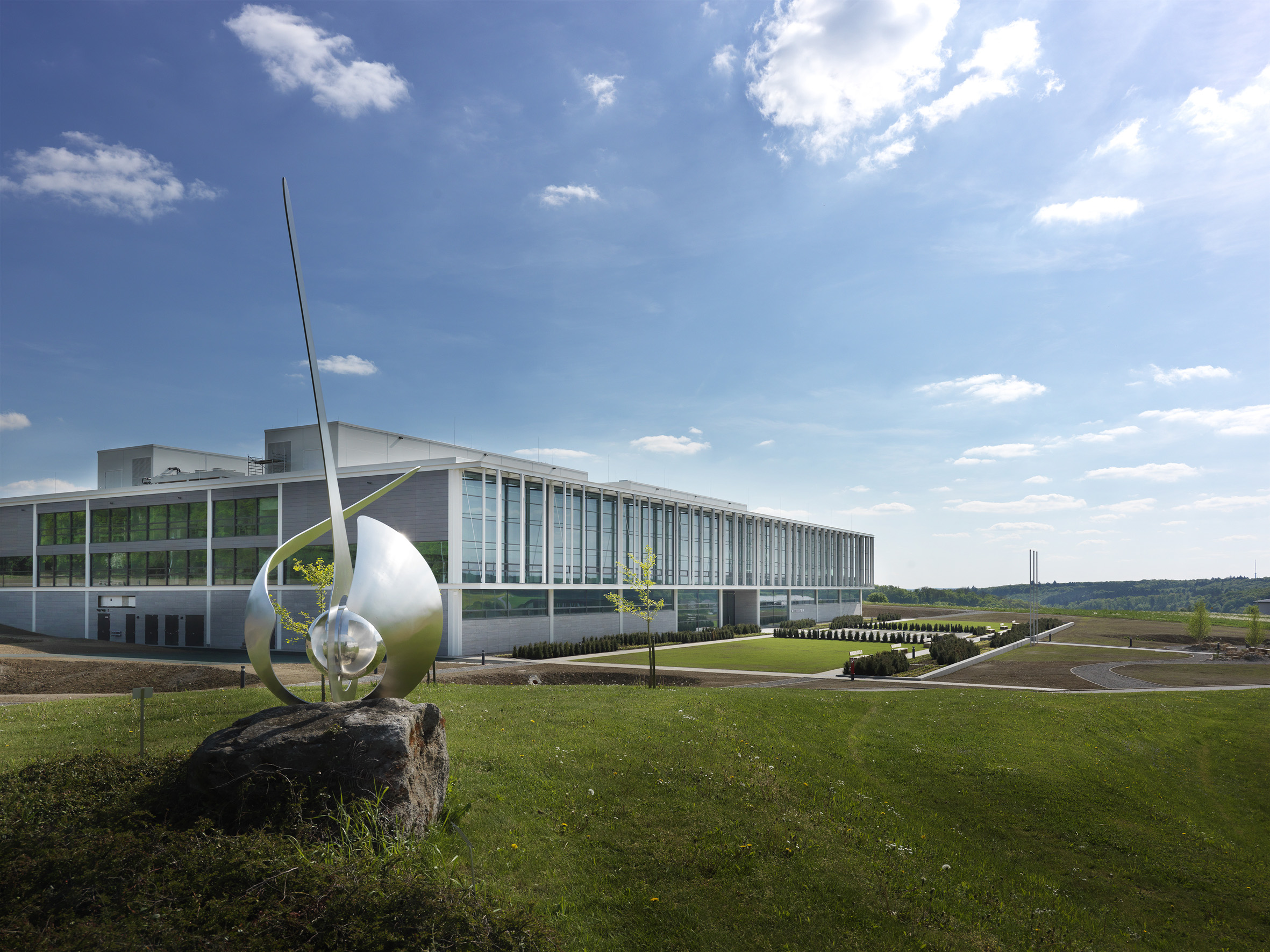
Wittenstein headquarters in Igersheim-Harthausen

Today, the group headquarters are in Igersheim-Harthausen – a star-shaped complex of administrative buildings, production shops and logistics centre. Gearhead cases, input shafts, attached motor components, etc. are still manufactured at Igersheim, while gear wheels continue to be produced in Fellbach – which was converted to a "Future Urban Production" (Urbanen Produktion der Zukunft) facility in 2010.

The first new buildings in the industrial park in Harthausen were occupied in 1996. A development and sales centre, a training and communication centre, a second production and assembly shop and a new logistics hall were added in 1999. A second logistics hall and third assembly shop were officially opened in the spring of 2002. Within the next five years, the number of production shops at the company headquarters increased to six.

In 1995, Manfred Wittenstein and Ullrich Lempp, then headmaster of the Deutschorden-Gymnasium school in Bad Mergentheim, set up the Wittenstein Foundation. The Foundation awards an annual scholarship in a natural science to one of the school's students. "Creative Young Minds", a competition aimed at young inventors in the local region, was likewise initiated by Manfred Wittenstein.

In 2001, the firm was given a new corporate structure when the original Wittenstein GmbH & Co. KG was transformed into a family owned, non-listed public limited company. Further subsidiaries came into being in 2003 (Wittenstein aerospace & simulation) and 2007 (Wittenstein electronics). In 2008, the Group acquired a majority share in Munich based attocube systems, which became a wholly owned subsidiary three years later in 2011.

Early in 2013, the company embarked on a search for a successor to Manfred Wittenstein as president; on 1 October 2014 that year, Professor Dieter Spath, an occupational scientist and Head of the Institute for Technology Management and Human Factors at the University of Stuttgart, took over as president on 1 October 2013; on 1 April 2014, Manfred Wittenstein was appointed Chairman of the Wittenstein Supervisory Board.

In 2017 Wittenstein acquired the entire share capital of baramundi software AG. Various reorganization and restructuring measures were implemented to strengthen Wittenstein's market orientation. Wittenstein Electronics GmbH was integrated into Wittenstein Cyber Motor GmbH. Wittenstein Motion Control GmbH, the business field of Industrial Systems, was divided between Wittenstein Cyber Motor GmbH and Wittenstein Alpha GmbH. The business field of oil and gas remained. Wittenstein Bastian GmbH, special-purpose gearheads and gearing was integrated into Wittenstein Alpha GmbH. The “future urban production” facility in Fellbach continued to be established as a production and competence center for gearing components and special-purpose gearheads.

Bernd Schimpf stepped down from the management board on March 31, 2019. Bertram Hoffmann became chairman of the board and chief executive officer of the Wittenstein Group on April 1, 2019. Dirk Haft, Erik Roßmeißl and Anna-Katharina Wittenstein completed the management board.

In March 2020, Wittenstein sold its medical division to the medical technology company Orthofix.

On 1 April 2020, Wittenstein galaxie GmbH, a new subsidiary, was founded, in order to be able to position and expand the radically innovative Galaxie drive technology on the market in an even more targeted manner. The two subsidiaries, Wittenstein Motion Control GmbH and Wittenstein Aerospace and Simulation GmbH are legally merged. The integration of Wittenstein Aerospace and Simulation GmbH allowed Wittenstein Motion Control GmbH to pool expertise and expand its business activities in mechatronic and cybertronic drive systems for extreme environments. Six strong strategic business divisions are now organized under the roof of the Wittenstein Group.

On November 4, 2020, Attocube Systems AG and Neaspec GmbH joined forces under the name Attocube Systems AG, with three strategic business divisions for nano positioning, cryogenic nanoscopy and nano spectroscopy.

Dirk Haft stepped down from the management board on June 30, 2021.

Wittenstein Foundation established in September 2021. The purpose of the Wittenstein Foundation is to promote education and training as well as science and research.

Steffen Schwerd is appointed Chief Sales Officer (CSO) of Wittenstein SE as of April 1, 2022. The baramundi software AG Software Factory is officially opened on June 2, 2022, in Augsburg.

== Facts and figures ==
- Sales 2002/2003: 85 million euros (+16%)
- Sales 2003/2004: 100 million euros (+17%)
- Sales 2004/2005: 116 million euros (+16.3%)
- Sales 2005/2006: 133 million euros (+14.8%)
- Sales 2006/2007: 148 million euros (+10.6%)
- Sales 2007/2008: 164 million euros
- Sales 2008/2009: 171 million euros
- Sales 2009/2010: 136.9 million euros
- Sales 2010/2011: 197 million euros
- Sales 2011/2012: 233 million euros
- Sales 2012/2013: 241 million euros
- Sales 2013/2014: 254 million euros
- Sales 2014/2015: 276 million euros
- Sales 2015/2016: 302 million euros
- Sales 2016/2017: 339 million euros
- Sales 2017/2018: 385 million euros
- Sales 2018/2019: 436,4 million euros
- Sales 2019/2020: 426,6 million euros
- Sales 2020/2021: 373,2 million euros
- Sales 2021/2022: 461,7, million euros
- Export rate: 52% (fiscal year 2021/22)
- 2785 employees worldwide (March 2022)
- Own academy (founded in 1999)
- Companies: with 25 sites in more than 45 countries Wittenstein is represented in all major technology and sales markets. (November 2020)
- The headquarters are in Igersheim-Harthausen; production also takes place in Germany in nearby Igersheim as well as in Fellbach, near Stuttgart. The Group additionally has international manufacturing locations as separate subsidiaries in the USA (Bartlett, near Chicago), Romania (Sura Mica, near Sibiu) and Switzerland (Grüsch, Grisons canton).
- Approximately 7% of the Group's annual turnover is expended on innovation activities; 12% of staff work in R&D
- Trainee ratio: 6%
- Management board: Bertram Hoffmann (CEO), Erik Roßmeißl and Steffen Schwerd
- Chairman of the Supervisory Board: Manfred Wittenstein
- Debut, the international Classical Singing Competition initiated in 2002 by Dr. Manfred Wittenstein, supports young opera singers. Wittenstein SE is the main sponsor.
