= WebMethods =

Enterprise software company, division of IBM

webMethods Inc.
- Industry: Computer software
- Founded: 1996
- Founder: Phillip Merrick; Caren Merrick
- Headquarters: Reston, Virginia
- Products: ESB, B2B, BPMS, BAM, SOA Governance, Application Modernization
- Owner: IBM (2024–present)
- Website: ibm.com/products/webmethods

webMethods was an enterprise software company focused on application integration, business process integration and B2B partner integration.

Founded in 1996, the company sold systems for organizations to use web services to connect software applications over the Internet. In 2000, the company stock shares rose over 500% the first day it was publicly traded.

In 2007 webMethods was acquired by Software AG for $546 million and was made a subsidiary. By 2010 the webMethods division accounted for almost half of the parent company's revenues.

Software AG retained the webMethods name, and uses it as a brand to identify a software suite encompassing process improvement, service-oriented architecture (SOA), IT modernization and business and partner integration.

In July 2024, IBM completed its purchase of webMethods and related products.

== History ==
The company was founded in 1996 by married couple Phillip Merrick (who was chief executive) and Caren Merrick (who was vice president for marketing using the name Caren DeWitt at the time) to use Web standards such as Hypertext Transfer Protocol (HTTP) and (later) XML to allow software applications to communicate with one another in real time. This type of technology would later be referred to as "web services". The company's first product, called the Web Automation Server was released in August 1996; this was later superseded by the webMethods B2B Server also called as webMethods Integration Server, which was the company's first product to see significant commercial use.

Initially, the founders used their savings and credit cards to keep the company operating in their house in Fairfax, Virginia. By 1999 the company had clients such as DHL Express, Dell, Dun & Bradstreet and Hewlett-Packard, and had completed several rounds of venture capital investment. Mayfield Fund and FBR Technology Venture Partners (an arm of Friedman Billings Ramsey) were among investors. In March 1999 the company entered into a partnership with SAP AG to create an SAP-focused integration product called the SAP Business Connector. The company's revenue went from around $500,000 in 1997 to $14 million in 1999 and $202 million in 2001.

In February 2000, webMethods had its initial public offering (IPO) on the NASDAQ exchange. Just before the offering, the share price rose from its planned $13 to $35, and in its first day of trading, closed over $212 per share. The company raised only $175 million, while being valued at almost $7 billion. Although the term "unicorn" was not yet used, one analyst said "The market is kind of foaming at the mouth on three-letter buzzwords, like B2B and XML". The quick rise of its share price is given as an example of the excess of the dot-com bubble.

The IPO allowed webMethods to acquire Active Software for an estimated $1.3 billion in stock shares in August 2000. Active Software, a public company based in Santa Clara, California and founded in 1994, had acquired Alier Inc., TransLink Software Inc. and Premier Software Technologies Inc in April 2000. In January, 2001, webMethods acquired IntelliFrame Corporation, which had been part of Computer Network Technology Corporation, for about $31 million. While revenues grew, the company posted continuing operating losses due to the early 2000s recession following the bursting of the dot-com bubble through 2002. Although its share price declined sharply from its peak, company executives, directors and investors still made large profits on their shares.

In October, 2003, the company announced it acquired three smaller companies in the integration market, for a combined estimated value of $32 million. The Mind Electric developed a technology called Glue, and its founder Graham Glass became the webMethods chief technical officer. The Dante Group developed software for business activity monitoring (BAM). The former DataChannel assets from Netegrity were used in a portal.

Deloitte estimated webMethods was the fourth fastest growing technology company in North America in 2003, on the Deloitte Fast 500. By October, 2004, after revenues declined and losses rose, Phillip Merrick was replaced as CEO by David Mitchell. In August, 2006, webMethods acquired Cerebra, a privately held company that developed metadata management software. In September, 2006, webMethods acquired Infravio (which developed a software registry) for $38 million.

The company was an early developer and promoter of standards for web service technologies, having worked on XML-RPC, a precursor to SOAP, and developed Web Interface Definition Language, a precursor to the Web Services Description Language standard.

As part of a larger trend of consolidation, Software AG (based in Darmstadt, Germany) bid to acquire webMethods in April 2007 for an estimated $546 million in cash. The offer price was more than 25% over the market price of its shares, and came one day after activist shareholders Augustus Oliver and Clifford Press disclosed a 6% stake and claimed the company was under-valued. Although speculation persisted that a competitor might make a higher bid, the deal closed in June, 2007. The brand webMethods was retained, effectively making webMethods its flagship product line, immediately doubling Software AG revenues in North America. WebMethods version 8.0 was released in 2009, supplemented with other Software AG products such as Centrasite, Tamino and EntireX. In 2010, the webMethods division of Software AG, known as business processes excellence (BPE) recorded $668 million (499 million Euros) in revenues and was a major contributor to company net income.

In 2011, Caren Merrick ran as a Republican for the Virginia state senate, saying her history with webMethods made her a "jobs creator", but was defeated by Barbara Favola.

In 2023, IBM acquired webMethods along with streamsets from Software AG. The acquisition was completed on 1st July 2024.

== releases for the webMethods Integration Server ==
- IBM webMethods Integration Server 11.1 - October 2024 (LINK)

== See also ==
- Middleware (distributed applications)
