= EntireX =

EntireX DCOM is a commercial implementation of Microsoft's Distributed Component Object Model (DCOM) technology by Software AG for the Windows, AIX, HP/UX, Solaris, Linux, AS/400, z/OS, z/VM, and BS2000/OSD platforms.

== Description ==
EntireX is a software product developed and marketed by Software AG. It is primarily an enterprise application integration product, designed to enable application-level integration of Windows clients (desktops, laptops, etc.) with 'legacy systems' (mainframes), packaged systems (such as other Software AG products) and Web services.

It enables communication between DCOM applications running on Windows and non-Windows platforms in heterogeneous networks (networks where software runs in diverse operating Systems and several types of hardware). For instance, it enables a DCOM application running on a Windows machine to communicate with a DCOM application running on an AS/400 platform. In recent years, Software AG has focused EntireX development on 'Web-enabling' mainframe applications. EntireX supports mainframe applications executing COBOL, Natural, Adabas, and other 'legacy' languages.

EntireX allows for direct user and client-computer interactions with the mainframe or web-hosted application, by encapsulating functions in an Active-X like control. Unlike screen scraping, EntireX allows old mainframe applications and web services to remain 'in place', while extending their functional capabilities to new platforms.

EntireX is XML compliant and offers a GUI wizard-based application for building integration solutions.

== Components ==
There are 3 components of EntireX:

- EntireX Communicator, which enables communications with back-end systems, and can handle synchronous and asynchronous communication
- EntireX XML Mediator, which is primarily a router for XML messages
- EntireX Adapters, which provide adapters to integrate with both front-end (e.g., web servers, app servers) and back-end (e.g. mainframe) systems

EntireX supports synchronous and asynchronous communications, load balancing, administrative and management re-configurations, metadata extraction, determining which Web Services are enabled and/or consumed, and related meta-operations.
