= University of Applied Sciences Offenburg =

University in Germany

Coordinates: 48°27′32″N 7°56′34″E

- Hochschule Offenburg
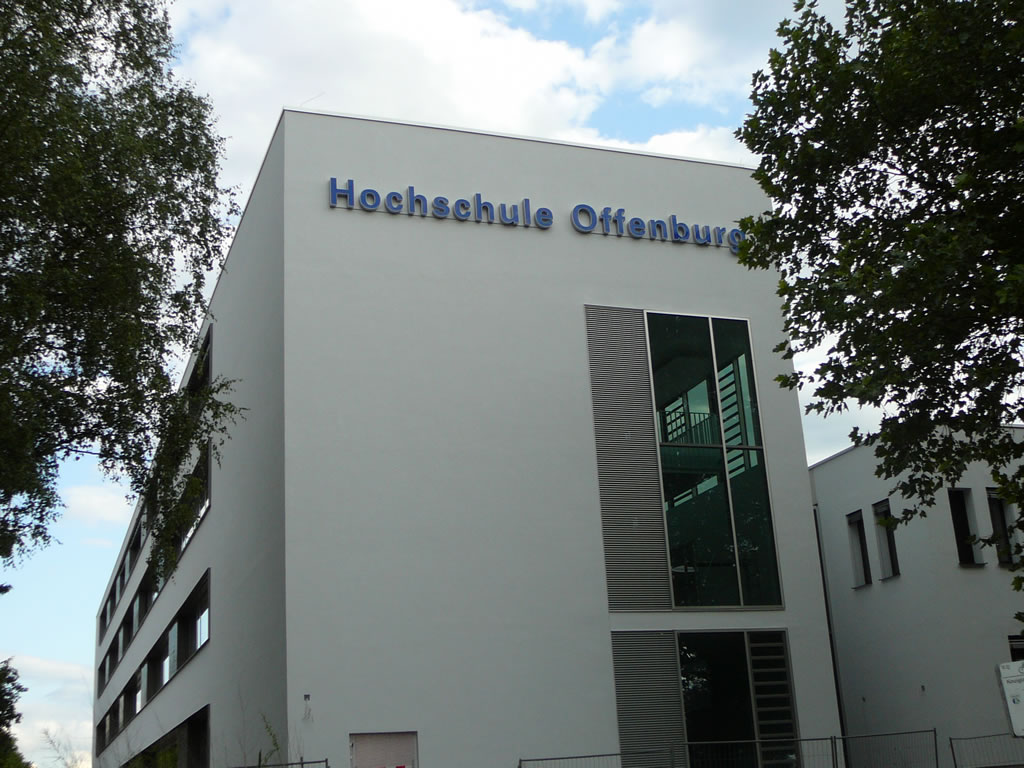
- Type: Public
- Established: 1967
- Rector: Stephan Trahasch
- Students: 4,090
- Location: Offenburg, Baden-Württemberg, Germany
- Campus: Offenburg, Gengenbach
- Colors
- Website: http://www.hs-offenburg.de

The University of Applied Sciences Offenburg, with its head office in Offenburg and a branch in Gengenbach, is a German university owned by the state of Baden-Württemberg. It is one of the most important educational institutions in the southern Upper Rhine area. Currently, about 4,090 students are enrolled.

== History ==
The University was founded in 1967 as the State Engineering School of Offenburg. Initially only the Mechanical Engineering and Electrical Engineering courses were offered. In 1970 the present campus was opened in the Badstraße Street, Offenburg. 1971 the conversion of the School of Engineering into the Fachhochschule of Offenburg followed. In 1978, the curriculum was expanded to include Economic courses. Therefore, the new faculty Economics was founded. It was decided, also due to space limitations, that the new faculty will get its own campus in a former monastery of the nearby town of Gengenbach. In 1984, already 1100 students studied in four faculties at the University of Applied Sciences Offenburg. To supplement the courses offered and for the sake of cooperation with the local publishing company Hubert Burda Media, 1996, the course Media and Information Sciences was established. In the same year the Institute for Applied Research was founded, which deals with research and research contracts from industry. In 2000, the University got the deserved reward for the continuous development. The Donors' Association for German Science awarded the University of Applied Sciences Offenburg the award "reform university". At the same time, the Graduate School of Offenburg University of Applied Sciences was founded, which today serves and coordinates four international study programs. As part of the transition to the Bachelor/Master's degrees (Bologna process) in 2005, the Fachhochschule Offenburg has been renamed to Hochschule Offenburg. 2007, the construction of a proper building for the Faculty of Media and Information Sciences was started. After 2 years of construction the new building was inaugurated in October 2009. The inauguration exercises were attended by the then Prime Minister of Baden-Wuerttemberg Günther Oettinger and the media entrepreneur Hubert Burda. Currently, about 3250 students study at the University of Offenburg.

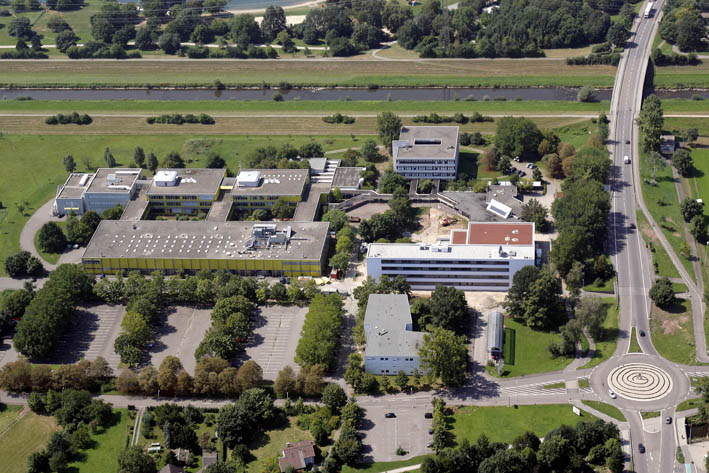
Bird's-eye view of the Campus Offenburg

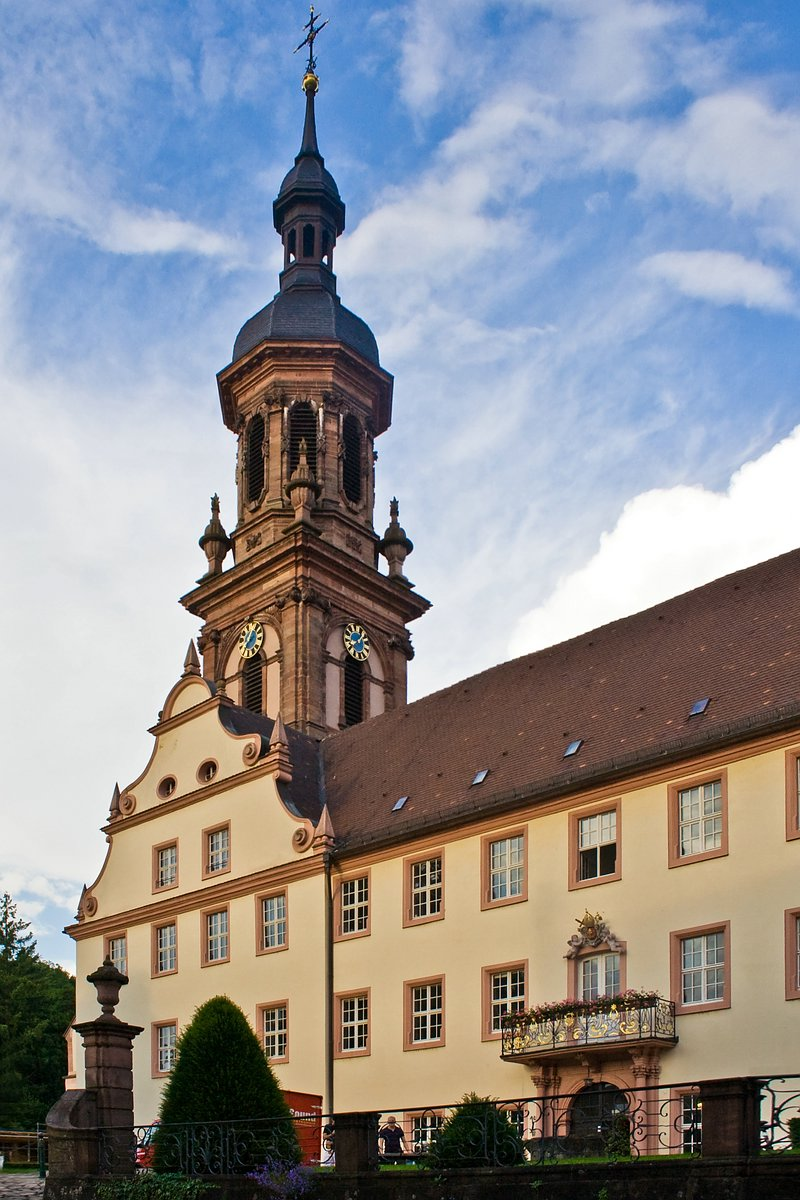
Campus Gengenbach

== Campuses ==
=== Offenburg ===
The main campus of the university is on the edge of the 60,000 inhabitants counting town of Offenburg. The cities of Strasbourg (20 km), Baden-Baden (50 km), Freudenstadt (50 km), Freiburg (65 km) and Karlsruhe (70 km) can be reached easily and quickly by car or train. Offenburg is a hub of international transport routes. It is just off the A5 motorway and is served on the Rhine Valley Railway of the German railway company Deutsche Bahn with the high speed train ICE. The Airport of Karlsruhe Baden-Baden, offering pan-European flights, is only 45 km away. Due to its attractive location, also internationally known companies, such as Hubert Burda Media, Tesa, Vivil and Elcoteq settled in the city of Offenburg. There are leisure activities in plenty in Offenburg, for it is in the middle of the green and fertile region Ortenau with many hiking and biking trails through the meadows and vineyards. An exciting variation offers the Europa-Park (30 km), Europe's largest theme park, with its many attractions and roller coasters. The Offenburg housing market and 3 student residences offer a variety of housing options for every taste and budget. On the Campus of Offenburg are the Departments of Electrical Engineering, Mechanical and Process Engineering as well as Media and Information science.

=== Gengenbach ===
On the campus of Gengenbach is the office of the Faculty of Business Management and Industrial Engineering. The building is one of the most beautiful university buildings in the region. It is the former Benedictine monastery Gengenbach. Parquet floor, sandstone walls, stucco and murals contribute to an incomparable atmosphere for the students. The city of Gengenbach with about 11.000 inhabitants has a 1250-year history. The center of the former free imperial city is listed and consists of numerous half-timbered houses. Every year thousands of tourists visit the historic old town and the campus Gengenbach. Annual highlight is the Christmas market with the biggest advent calendar house in the world, which attracts about 100,000 visitors each year. But even in the year are offered in the numerous pubs and restaurants as well as at many cultural events for every taste. The Offenburg campus and the city can be reached after only a short journey by train, bus or by car in only a few minutes.

== Faculties ==
=== Business Management and Industrial Engineering ===
The Faculty of Business Management and Industrial Engineering was established in 1978 at the campus of Gengenbach. With a technical orientation, the Faculty wants to develop a new breed of leaders who not only know about economic science but also have engineering and computer science knowledge. For this reason four laboratories are reserved for the faculty at the Campus of Offenburg. The Department currently has 21 professors and 51 lecturers looking after more than 740 students.

The main research areas of the faculty are:

- Lean Manufacturing and Process Design
- Optimal Construction
- Economic Computer Science
- Internationalization of Accounting and Reporting
- Logistics and Trade
- IT-supported Application of Operations Research

=== Electrical Engineering and Information Engineering ===
The faculty is located on the campus of Offenburg and is one of the two founding members of university faculties. Because of constant innovations in this science area, the curriculum has been adapted dynamically to the requirements of the education and the labor market. Also due to this flexibility, the Department can be found in the top third of the annual college ranking. To make the department more attractive for the students, in the nineties, new courses in the areas of applied computer science and mechatronics have been set up. The schooling of students is focused on practical education. Therefore, the faculty attaches great importance to a good connection to the industry. The faculty has 18 professors and 43 lecturers looking for more than 565 students. There are 19 laboratories reserved for the faculty.

The main research areas of the faculty are:

- Design of Microelectronic Systems
- Control Technology, Sensors and Actuators
- Radio Communication and Satellite Navigation
- Optoelectronics and Photonics
- Renewable Energy and Data Engineering
- Software Engineering and Distributed Systems

=== Mechanical Engineering and Process Engineering ===
The Faculty of Mechanical Engineering and Process Engineering combines different systems in the areas of traditional engineering with those of the energy and process engineering. The aim is to produce competitive products and facilities. In mechanical engineering the students can choose between a focus on development, design or production. In the field of process engineering they can choose between a focus on energy technology, environmental technology and biotechnology. The Faculty employs 33 professors and 32 lecturers looking after more than 796 students. There are 20 laboratories reserved for the faculty.

The main research areas of the faculty are:

- Thermo and Fluid Dynamics
- Machine Dynamics and Biomechanics
- Measuring and Control Engineering
- Energy Technology and Solarthermics
- Digital Online Library
- Nanoparticles
- Emission Analysis
- Chromatography, Environmental Analysis and Biological Analysis

=== Media and Information Technology ===
The Faculty of Media and Information Technology trains the students in media technology, media, computer science, media business management and design of media productions. The aim of the faculty is to combine those two sub-disciplines during the study and thus form future leaders. The students should get trained in design skills and analytical ability as well as in management skills and technology knowledge. Also, the computer science field is part of the education. Currently, 13 professors and 33 lecturers look after more than 400 students. The faculty has its own specially constructed building on the campus Offenburg, including 11 laboratories.

The main research areas of the faculty are:

- E-learning Technologies
- Multimedia Databases
- Communication and Visualization
- IT security
- Changes in the Media and Communications Market
- Media Research

== Courses ==
=== Business Management and Industrial Engineering ===
Bachelor
Business Management
Industrial Engineering with Business Management
Media Technology / Business plus
Logistics and Trade
Business Computer Science
Master
Business Management
Industrial Engineering with Business Management
International Business Consulting (MBA)
Part Time MBA Program

=== Electrical Engineering and Information Engineering ===
Bachelor
Electrical Engineering / Information Technology
Applied Computer Science
Medical Engineering
Mechatronics
Master
Communications and Media Engineering
Computer Science
Electrical Engineering / Information Technology
Mechatronics

=== Mechanical Engineering and Process Engineering ===
Bachelor
Mechanical Engineering
Power Systems Engineering
Process Engineering
Mechatronics
Mechanical Engineering / Materials Engineering
Master
Mechanical Engineering
Energy Conversion and Management
Energy Economics
Process Engineering

=== Media and Information Technology ===
Bachelor
Media and Information Technology
Media Technology / Economy
Media Design and Media Production
Business and IT Security
Master
Media and Communication
Communication and Media Engineering
Media in Education

== Graduate school ==
The Graduate School of Offenburg University offers special courses in English for the global job market. Currently, about 13 percent of all students at the university come from abroad. The Graduate School offers four English-language Master's programs in Information Technology, Energy Technology and Management.

- Communication and Media Engineering (M.Sc.)
- Energy Conversation and Management (M.Sc.)
- International Business Consulting (MBA)
- Master of Process Engineering (MSc)

In addition, bilateral programs with France, Chile and Switzerland are offered. The Graduate School is open to both German and foreign students. An above average first degree is required. The Graduate School offers a comprehensive and total supply and coordinates business contacts, international university marketing, application and admission procedures, interdisciplinary courses, support for international students, cooperation, international alumni work, quality issues and auditing matters. For this comprehensive offering, the Graduate School has already received numerous awards. Including the award of the German Academic Exchange Service (DAAD) with the quality label "TOP 10 International Master's Degree Courses Made in Germany ".
