= Gengenbach =

Town in Baden-Württemberg, Germany

- City
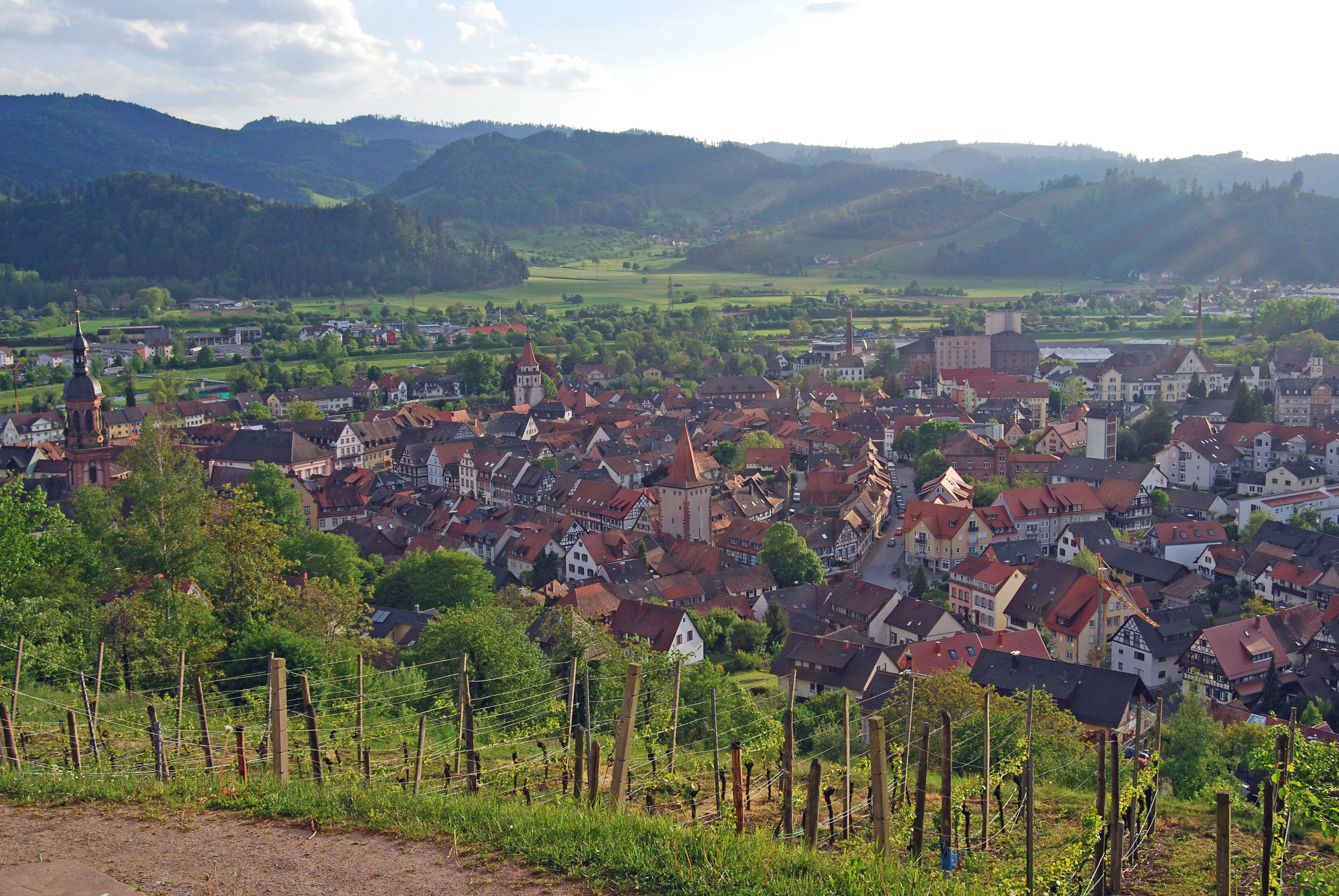
- Gengenbach

- Coat of arms

- Location of Gengenbach within Ortenaukreis district
- Interactive map of Gengenbach
- Location within Germany Location within Baden-Württemberg
- Coordinates: 48°24′N 8°01′E
- Country: Germany
- State: Baden-Württemberg
- Admin. region: Freiburg
- District: Ortenaukreis

Government
  - Mayor (2019–27): Thorsten Erny

Area
  - Total: 61.9 km^{2} (23.9 sq mi)
- Elevation: 175 m (574 ft)

Population (2025-12-31)
  - Total: 11,135
  - Density: 180/km^{2} (466/sq mi)
- Time zone: UTC+01:00 (CET)
  - Summer (DST): UTC+02:00 (CEST)
- Postal codes: 77723
- Dialling codes: 07803
- Vehicle registration: OG, BH, KEL, LR, WOL
- Website: www.stadt-gengenbach.de

Gengenbach (German pronunciation: [ˈɡɛŋənˌbax]; Low Alemannic: Gängäbach) is a town in the district of Ortenau, Baden-Württemberg, Germany, and a popular tourist destination on the western edge of the Black Forest, with about 11,000 inhabitants. Gengenbach is well known for its traditional Alemannic "fasnacht", ("Fasend"), a kind of historically influenced celebration of carnival, where tradition is followed, from wearing costumes with carved wooden masks to clapping with a "Ratsche" (a traditional-classic wooden "sound-producing" toy). Gengenbach also boasts a picturesque, traditional, medieval town centre ("Altstadt"). The traditional town Gengenbach is the proud owner of the world's biggest advent calendar. The 24 windows of the 18th century town hall represent the 24 "windows" of an Advent calendar. The town also hosts a department of The Graduate School of Offenburg University of Applied Sciences, part of the University of Applied Sciences Offenburg. The nearest cities in the region are Offenburg, Freiburg, Karlsruhe, Baden-Baden and Strasbourg/France. Gengenbach is twinned with the town of Obernai, Alsace, France.

In the 2005 film version of Charlie and the Chocolate Factory, Gengenbach was inaccurately referred to as Düsseldorf, the place where the character Augustus Gloop becomes the first finder of Wonka's Golden ticket.

== History ==
Gengenbach was founded in the 13th century and was an Imperial Free City from 1360 until the Treaty of Lunéville in 1801. During the closing stages of the 1672-1678 Franco-Dutch War in July 1678, it was the site of a French victory over the Imperialists; it was badly damaged in 1689 by retreating French forces in the 1688-1697 Nine Years War.

== Gallery ==
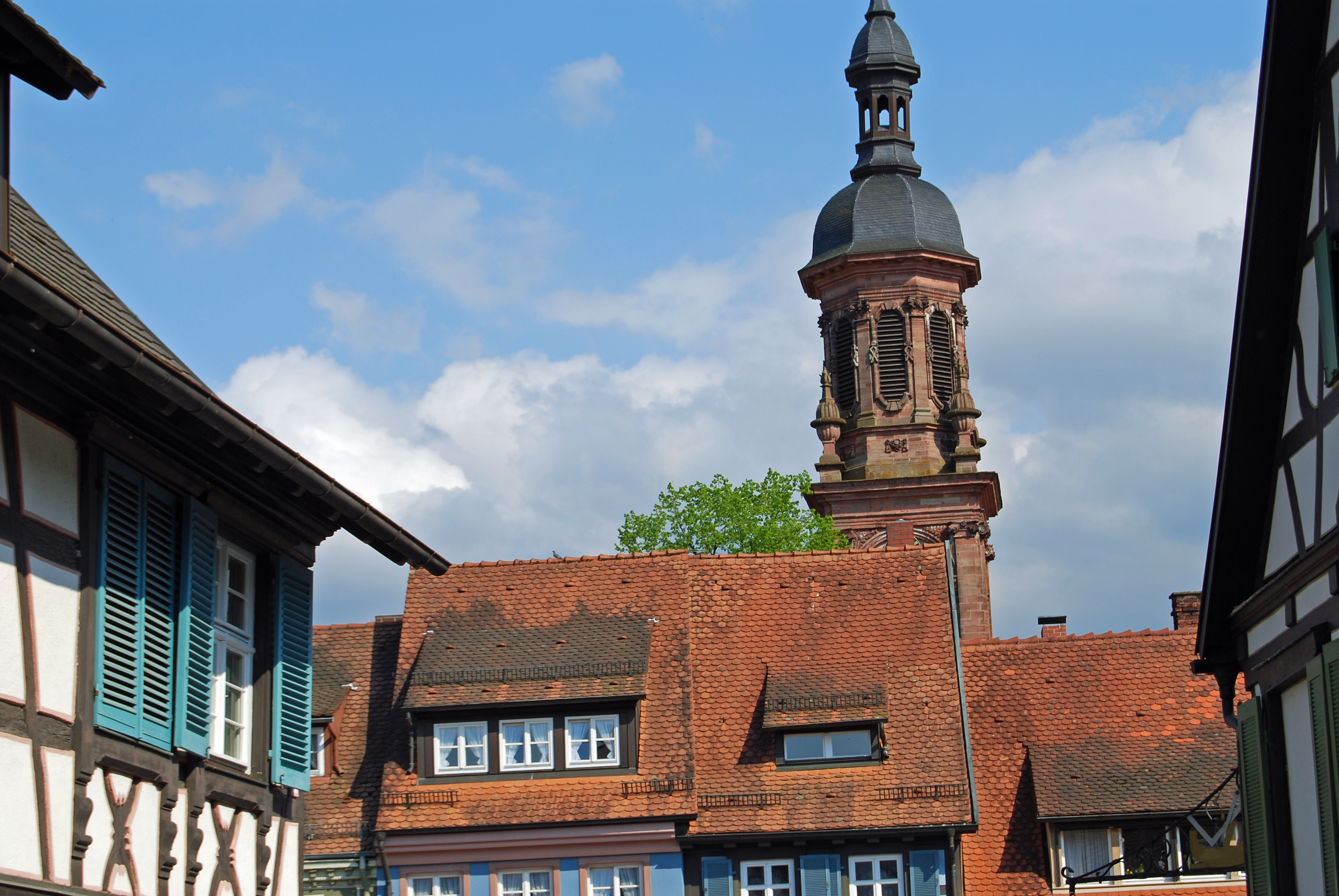
Gengenbach

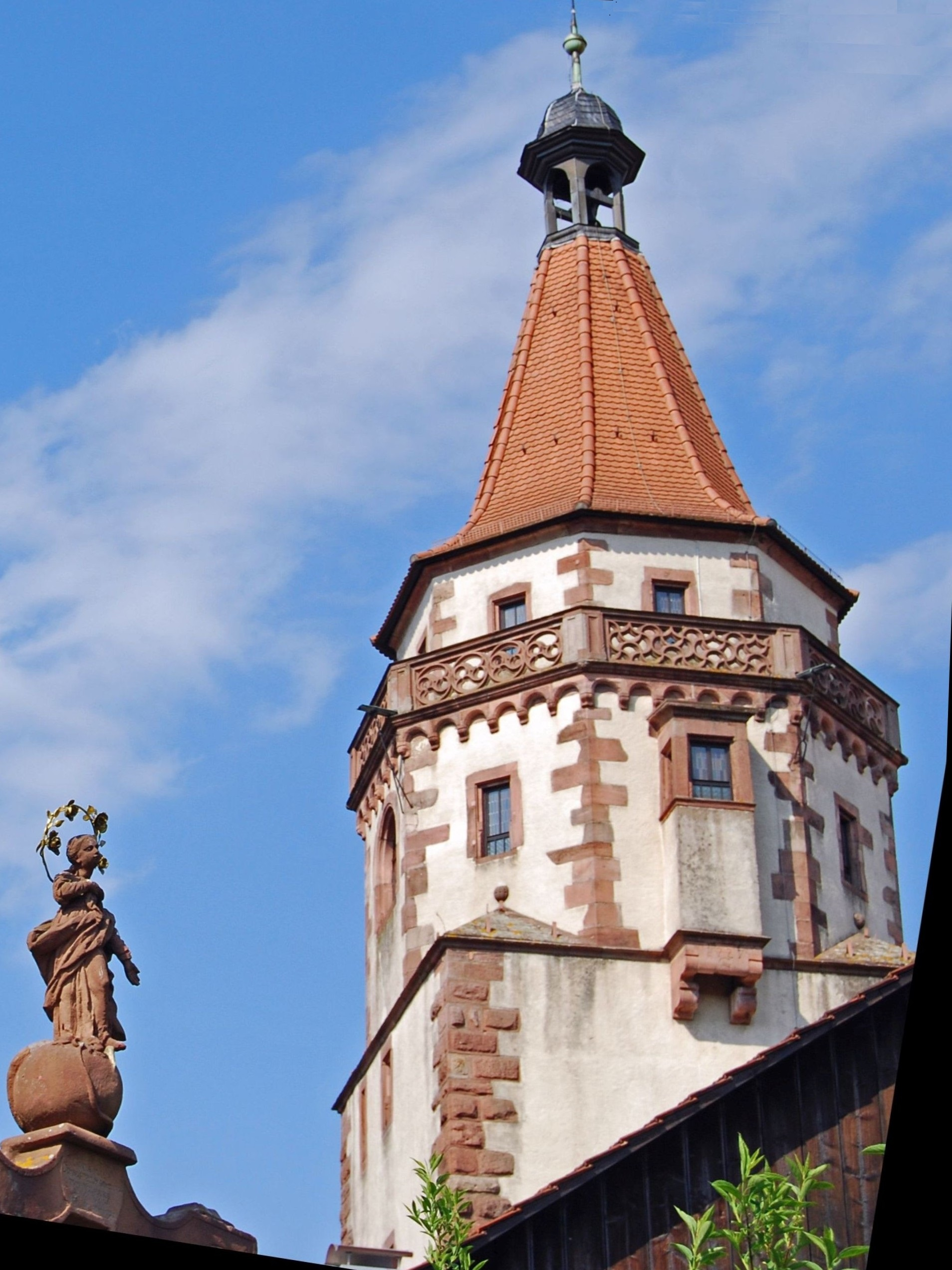
Niggelturm

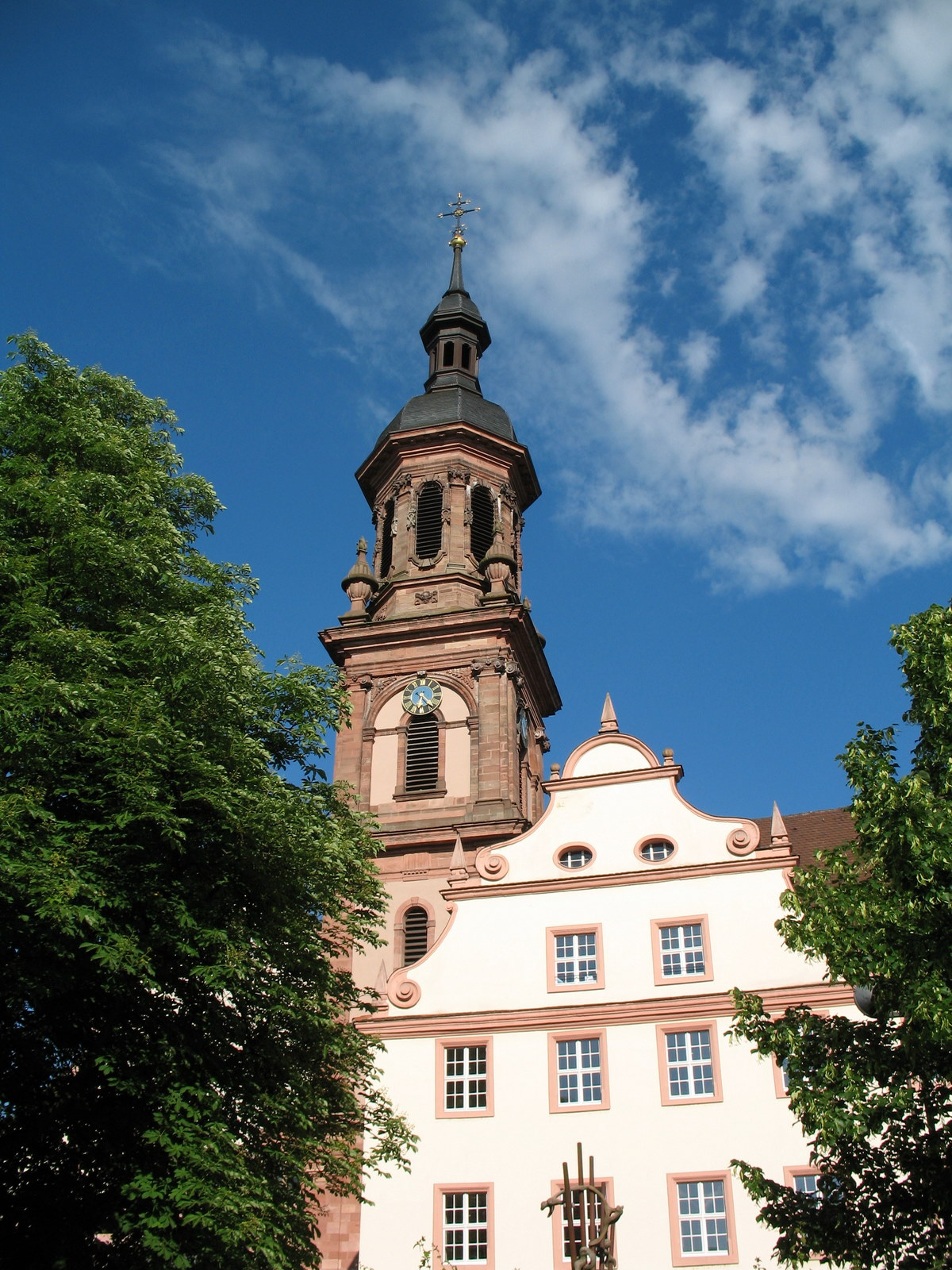
Kloster Gengenbach

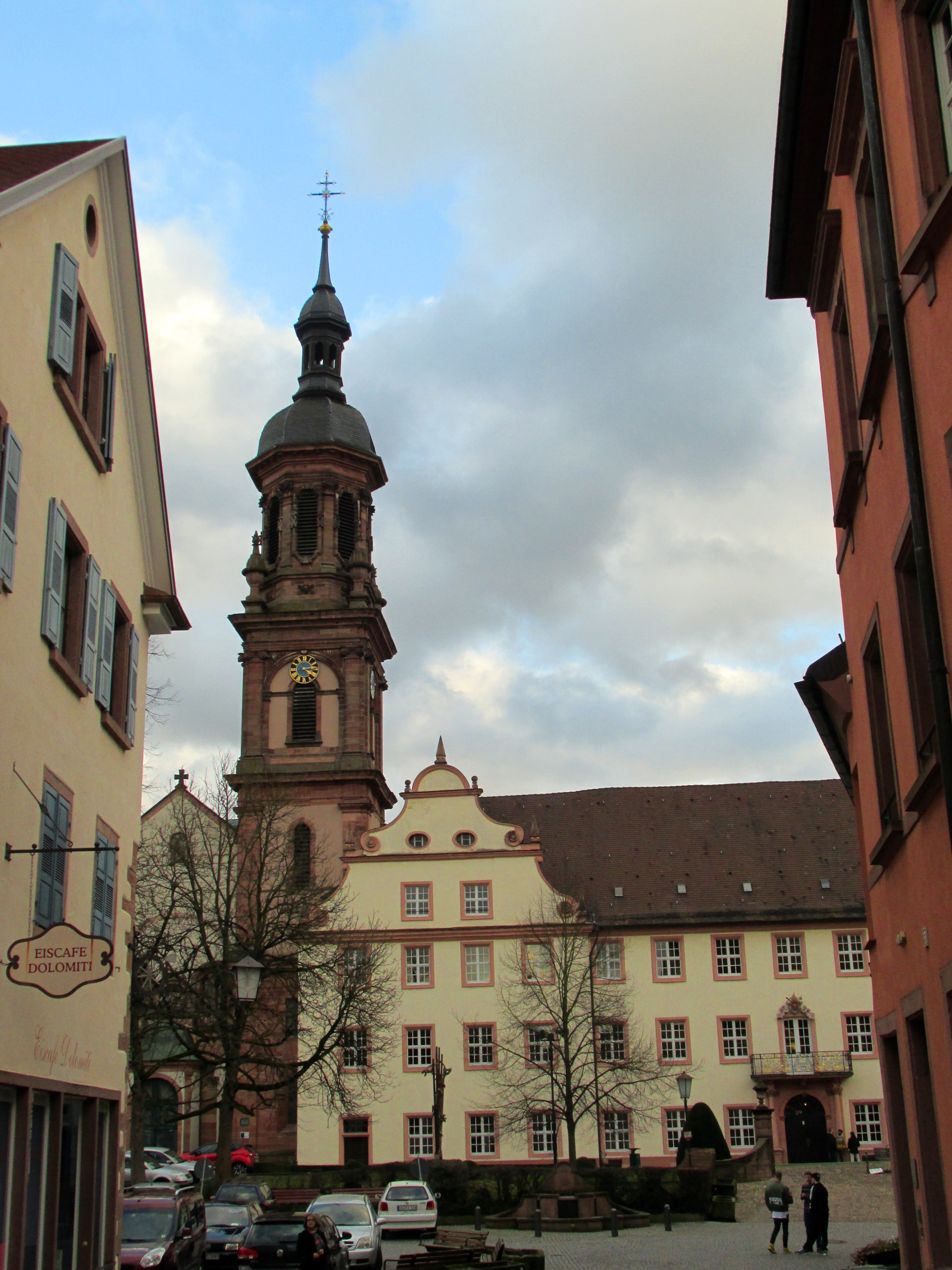
Stadtkirche Sankt Marien

== Culture and landmarks ==
Gengenbach is the start point of Gengenbach–Alpirsbach Black Forest Trail and situated at the Kinzigtäler Jakobusweg (a pilgrim route) as well as the Kandelhöhenweg (a hiking path), passing by many landmarks. Furthermore, the city is located at the German Fachwerkstraße.

The town was the location of Gengenbach Abbey, founded in the 8th century; its associated church, the Stadtkirche Sankt Marien, was rebuilt after 1689 and contains a number of 18th century frescoes.

=== Museums ===
- Flößerei- und Verkehrsmuseum
- Museum Haus Löwenberg
- Narrenmuseum im Niggelturm
- Kunst- und Paramentenmuseum im Mutterhaus der Franziskanerinnen
- Wehrgeschichtliches Museum im Kinzigtor

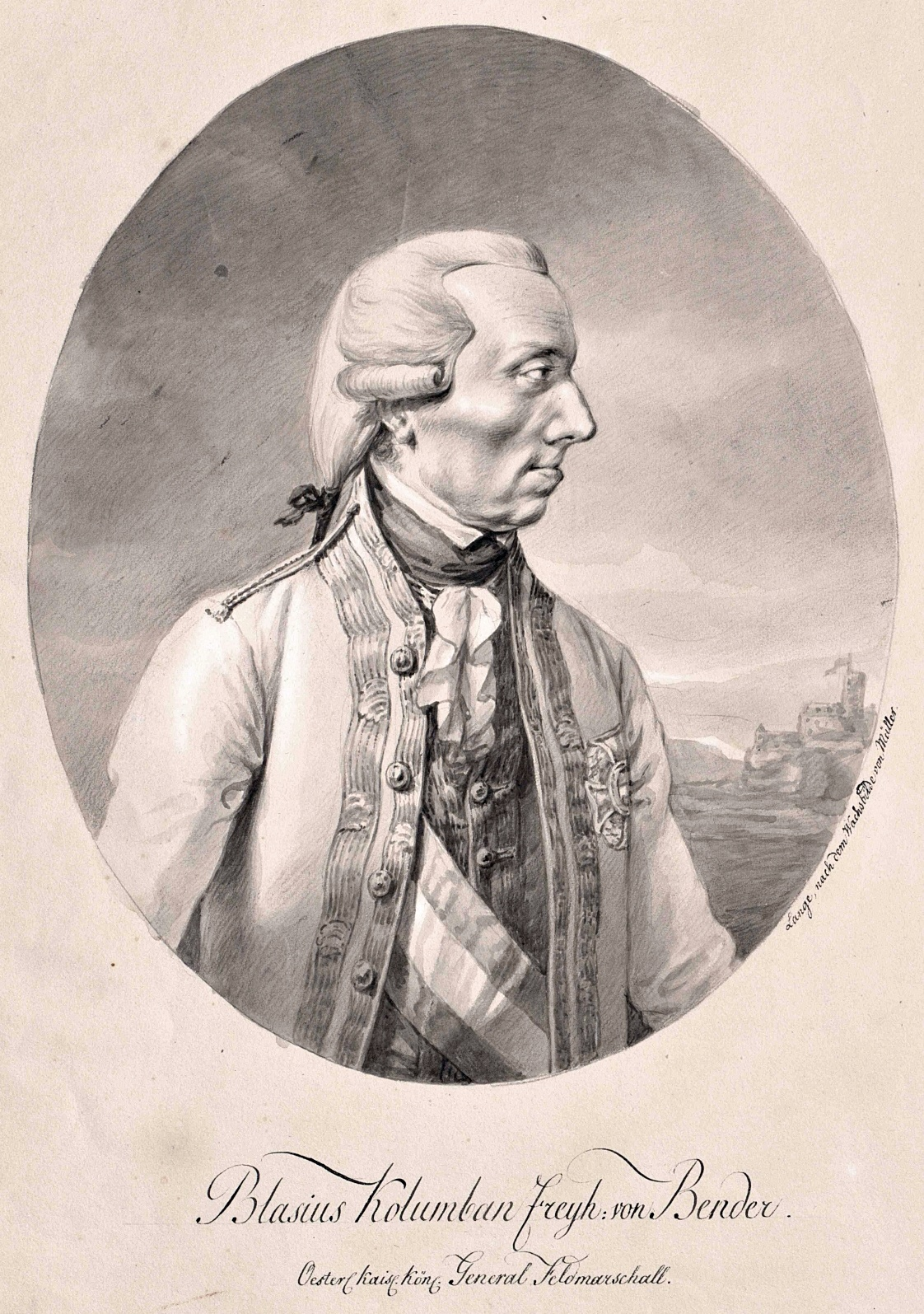
Blasius Columban, Baron von Bender, painted ca1800

=== Notable people ===
- Blasius Columban, Baron von Bender (1713–1798), officer in the Imperial Army of the Holy Roman Emperor
- Konrad Valentin von Kaim (1737–1801), a French soldier and an Austrian infantry commander
- Amalie Hofer (1820–1872), agitator and revolutionary in the German revolutions of 1848–1849
- Hermann Maas (1877-1970), a Protestant minister and doctor of theology
- Frieder Burda (1936-2019), publisher and art collector
- Otto Lohmüller (born 1943), figurative painter, sculptor and book illustrator.
- Patrick Lienhard (born 1992), footballer who has played over 340 games

=== Further regular events ===
- Every year the city hall of Gengenbach is transformed in the world's largest "Advent calendar house"
- On the third September weekend the wine festival takes place – every year
- The "Martinimarkt" is a funfair which takes place in November – for two days
