= Lohmiller =

Lohmiller is a surname of German origin. Notable people with the surname include:

- Charles B. Lohmiller (c.1867–1932), superintendent of the Fort Peck Indian Agency in Montana, US
- Chip Lohmiller (born 1966), former professional American football placekicker

== See also ==
- Lohmüller
