= Terracotta, Inc. =

Computer software company

- Industry: Computer software
- Founded: San Francisco, California, 2003
- Products: BigMemory; Enterprise Ehcache; Quartz Scheduler; Web Sessions; Terracotta Enterprise Suite; In-Genius
- Number of employees: 50–100
- Parent: Software AG
- Website: www.terracotta.org

Terracotta, Inc., is a computer-software company that specializes in database applications. The company is owned by Software AG.

== History ==
Terracotta started as a provider of clustering technologies to move clustering and caching services to the Java Virtual Machine (JVM) instead of the application.

In August 2009, Terracotta purchased Ehcache. That year, Terracotta also acquired Quartz.

Software AG acquired Terracotta in May 2011.
