= The Graduate School of Offenburg University of Applied Sciences =

Coordinates: 48.4589°N 7.94278°E

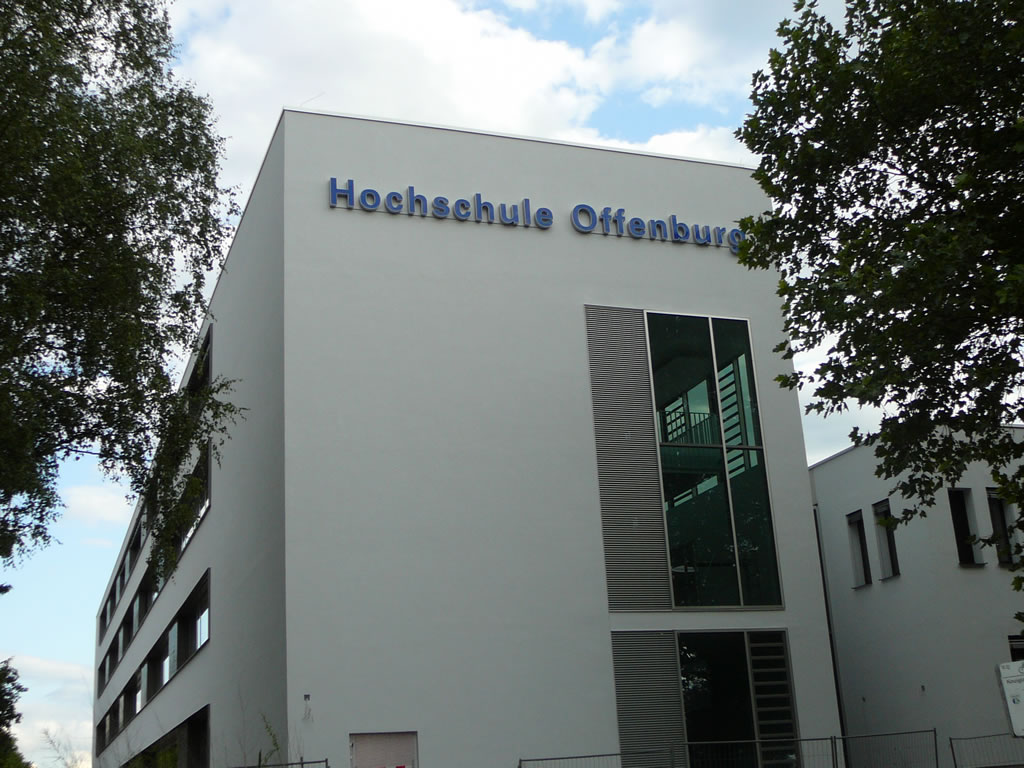
- Hochschule Offenburg
- Type: Public university
- Established: 1964
- Affiliations: University of Applied Sciences Offenburg
- Rector: Winfried Lieber
- Students: 4087
- Location: Offenburg, Baden-Württemberg, Germany
- Website: http://www.hs-offenburg.de

The Graduate School of the University of Applied Sciences Offenburg is a public university located in the town of Offenburg, Baden-Württemberg, Germany. The Graduate School offers four international Master's degree programs with focus ranging from Communication and Media to Energy Conversion and Business Consulting.

The Master's program of Communication and Media Engineering is ranked in Top 10 2008 Germany International Master Degree Courses from DAAD. More recently the MBA (IBC) program has been ranked within the QS 200 Business Schools Report.

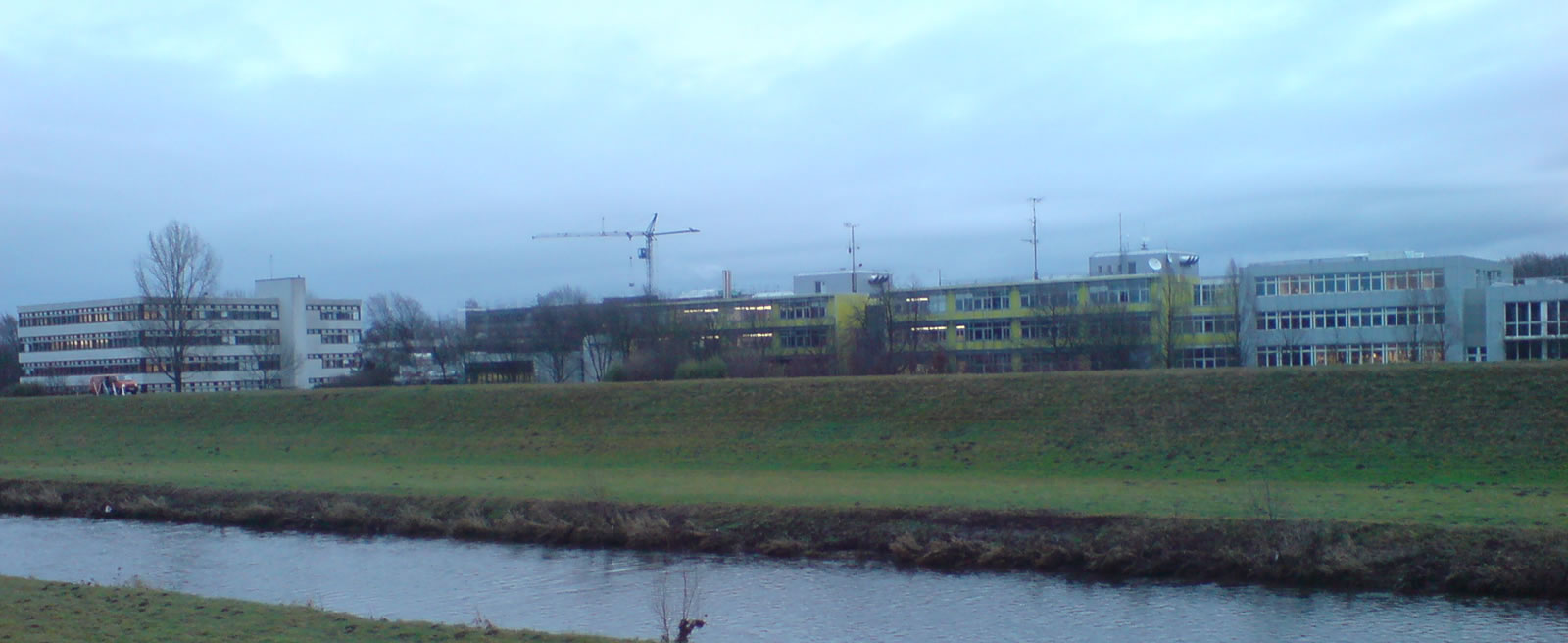
Hochschule Offenburg, Panorama

== History ==
The university was founded in 1964 originally as a state engineering school with the Departments of Mechanical and Electrical Engineering. From 1971 the university was called Fachhochschule Offenburg (FHO). In 1978, the curriculum was expanded to include business studies, which initiated the Campus Gengenbach. In 1996, the Fourth Department of Media and Information Sciences was supplemented. 2000, the Graduate School was founded, which today serves and coordinates four international study programs. In 2005, as part of the transition to the Bachelor/Master's degrees (Bologna process), the university has been renamed to Hochschule Offenburg (HSO). In 2009, after a 2 years construction period, the new extension building for the faculty "Media and Information" has been inaugurated.

== The Programs ==
- Communication and Media Engineering (CME)

The central idea and vision for the Master's Degree Program "Communication and Media Engineering" is to educate a scientific elite in the cutting-edge Telecommunication and Digital Media Technologies. The program provides graduates with the necessary tools for a career in the field of media and communication technology as well in the academic and in the business world.

- Energy Conversion and Management (ECM)

Is a three semester full time MSc degree program with two theoretical semesters and a last semester dedicated to the master thesis. The Program’s main items, Energy Conversion Techniques and Energy Related Business Economics, include mandatory and elective courses.

- MBA in International Business Consulting (IBC)

Is a compact, hands-on, international full-time program preparing you in only 15 months for a leading position in in-house Consulting as well as in external Consulting, e.g. Controlling, Project Management and Management Consulting.

- Master of Process Engineering (MPE)

Is a consecutive graduate study program offered by the University of Applied Sciences Offenburg, the University of Warmia and Mazury (UWM) in Olsztyn, Poland, and the University of Applied Sciences of Western Switzerland in Fribourg, but graduates of similar first degree programs at other universities are also most welcome. The program, accredited by the internationally recognized agency ASIIN, is completely taught in English. According to personal interests elective modules can be chosen in the areas of bioprocess engineering, geotechnics and thermal treatment. These elective modules supplement the compulsory modules in the areas of chemical, environmental and bio-engineering. In this way all important areas of process engineering are covered.

== Alumni Network ==
The Alumni-Network of the Hochschule Offenburg was founded in 1999 and was mainly tailored towards the needs of German alumni of the university. The international profile of the Hochschule Offenburg has been intensified in recent years and along with it comes the need for a more international approach towards our alumni activities.
