= Peter Schnell (politician) =

German politician (1935–2024)

Member of the Landtag of Bavaria
- In office 2 December 1966 – 31 July 1972

Personal details
- Born: 9 December 1935 Ingolstadt, Gau Munich-Upper Bavaria, Germany
- Died: 3 November 2024 (aged 88)
- Party: CSU
- Education: LMU Munich; University of Erlangen–Nuremberg
- Occupation: Lawyer

Peter Schnell (9 December 1935 – 3 November 2024) was a German lawyer and politician. A member of the Christian Social Union in Bavaria, he served in the Landtag of Bavaria from 1966 to 1972, and was Mayor of Ingolstadt for thirty years.

Schnell died on 3 November 2024, at the age of 88.
