= United Nations International Computing Centre =

Specialized agency of the United Nations

United Nations International Computing Centre (UNICC)
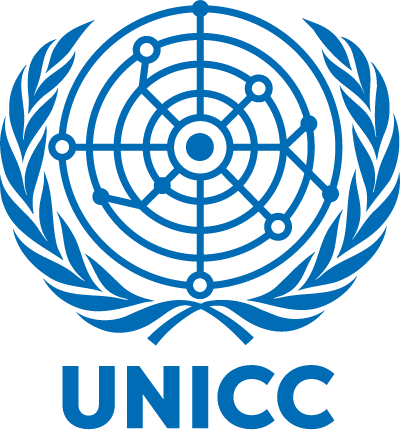
- Abbreviation: UNICC
- Formation: 1971; 55 years ago
- Legal status: Active Non-profit
- Headquarters: Geneva, Switzerland and offices in New York City – U.S., Brindisi and Rome – Italy, Valencia, Spain and Hanoi, Vietnam.
- Staff: 500+
- Website: www.unicc.org

The United Nations International Computing Centre (UNICC) was established in 1971 by a Memorandum of Agreement among the United Nations (UN), the United Nations Development Programme (UNDP) and the World Health Organization (WHO), pursuant to resolution 2741 (XXV) of the United Nations General Assembly. It was created as an inter-organization facility to provide electronic data processing services for themselves and other users.

UNICC provides information and communications technology (ICT) services to United Nations programmes, funds, and entities. Its mission is to provide ICT services to the United Nations family, maximise the sharing of infrastructure, systems and skills and generate economies of scale to benefit its clients and partner organizations, including United Nations and related not-for-profit entities.

UNICC has over 800 staff at its headquarters in Geneva, Switzerland and offices in New York City, Brindisi, Rome, Valencia, Spain, and Hanoi, Vietnam.

== Offices ==
- Geneva, Switzerland
- Valencia, Spain
- Rome
- Brindisi
- New York City

== Services ==
UNICC offers consulting services in the areas of strategic advisory services and subject matter expertise.

- UNICC Consulting
- IT Advisory Firms
- Learning
- Digital Business Communications
- Project Management
- Application Development
- Monitoring
- Robotic Process Automation
- Electronic Signature services
- Secure AUTHN services

UNICC offers its clients hosting and delivery of software applications.

- Amazon Web Services Management
- Microsoft 365 Management
- Microsoft Azure Management
- Cloud Web Hosting
- Microsoft Dynamics 365
- ServiceNow Support

UNICC's information security services cover cyber security oversight and governance as well as a spectrum of operational components.

- Governance and CISO Support
- Threat Intelligence Network
- Security Operations Centre
- Security Information and Event Management
- Phishing and Vulnerability Management
- Penetration testing
- Incident Response and Forensics
- Information Security Awareness
- Infrastructure and Network Support
- PKI Digital Identity

UNICC offers computing platforms that allow administrators and developers to create, run, and customise their application suites, including software-as-a-service components.

- Enterprise Resource Planning
- Enterprise Web Applications, Hosting and Traffic Analysis
- Enterprise SharePoint
- Business Intelligence Platform Support

UNICC offers data and analytics services.

- Consulting and Support
- Data Analytics – Visualisation
- Advanced Analytics
- Data Management
- Database Services

UNICC provides computing infrastructure resources to manage networking, data centres, and infrastructure elements.

- Business Continuity and Disaster Recovery Planning
- Servers and Enterprise Server Support
- Storage on Demand and Management
- Enterprise Backup
- Data Centre Consolidation
- Network Services
- Internet and Connectivity
- OneICTBox

== Awards ==
- 2020; 6 years ago Information security – 2020 CSO50 Award for its Common Secure Information Security services
- 2020; 6 years ago Innovation – ITU Innovation Challenge 2020 winner for UNICC and Microsoft's UN Digital Academy
- 2020; 6 years ago UN Digital Identity – UN Digital ID project from the UN Digital Solutions Centre, with operations by UNICC, is the winner of the Reimagine the UN Together Challenge 2020
- 2017; 9 years ago Information security – 2017 CSO50 Award for its Common Secure Information Security services
