= Peter Schnell (computer scientist) =

German computer scientist and entrepreneur

Peter M. Schnell (born 10 June 1938 in Berlin) is a German computer scientist, founder of Software AG and long-time chairman of the Vorstand, executive board.

== Life ==
He grew up in Alsbach-Hähnlein near Darmstadt. Schnell was impressed by the IBM 650, the first commercial mainframe computer that Alwin Walther had procured for Technische Universität Darmstadt (TU Darmstadt). He then studied physics and mathematics at TU Darmstadt. In 1965 he graduated with a diplom in mathematics under Walther. Already as a student he gave courses in programming languages and worked as a freelance programmer for Euratom and at the German Computer Center in Darmstadt.

He was one of the best Go players in Europe.

== Software AG ==
In 1969, together with five other colleagues from the Institute for Applied Information Processing (AIV), Schnell founded Software AG in Darmstadt out of a garage with a starting capital of 6.000 German Mark and several patents. Among the colleagues was Peter Pagé, who left the company in 1992 after differences with Schnell. In the company, Schnell designed and developed the Adabas (Adaptable Database System) database management system. The mathematician based his concept on the NF² database model (NF² stands for NFNF = non first normal form). In 1971, the high-performance system was put into operation for the first time at Westdeutsche Landesbank. Schnell was responsible for the maintenance and further development of Adabas for mainframe systems of IBM and Siemens AG. The system was later used by numerous customers on the operating system platforms VMS from DEC, various Unix systems, Linux and Windows. Adabas is the fastest commercially available database management system in the world.

In 1996, the sole shareholder retired from the Vorstand of Software AG and did not move to the supervisory board. At that time, Software AG had 28 subsidiaries in 80 countries, more than 3,300 employees were employed and sales revenues at that time amounted to approximately 800 million German Mark.

Schnell then became a founder of the Software AG Foundation, one of the largest private foundations in Germany with headquarters in Darmstadt. The foundation holds 29 percent of the shares of Software AG. Soon after leaving his company, he devoted himself entirely to the foundation's work. He is an anthroposophist, and the foundation supports projects in the field of youth, elderly and disabled work as well as in science, research, education and nature conservation, including the University of Witten-Herdecke and the Alanus University of Arts and Social Sciences in Bonn. Schnells work was strongly influenced by the teaching of Rudolf Steiner. One motive for Schnells social commitment was that he himself has two sons with intellectual disabilities.

== Awards ==
In 2002 he was awarded the Medal for Services to the Foundation System of the Federal Association of German Foundations for his foundation work by the President of Germany Johannes Rau. On 7 May 2009, Schnell was awarded the Federal Cross of Merit, 1st class.

He received an honorary doctorate from the Witten/Herdecke University.
