= Otto Lohmüller =

German painter (born 1943)

Otto Lohmüller (born 4 February 1943 in Gengenbach, Baden-Württemberg, Germany) is a German figurative painter, sculptor and book illustrator. His art typically features images of early adolescent males, both clothed and nude, although in his published work there is little overt eroticism.

He works almost exclusively with the human form, usually with minimal backgrounds, in an idealized near-photographic realist style. In addition to boys, his portraits and sculpture include people of all ages from his town, people from his travels to India and Southeast Asia, and occasionally public figures. Some of his works contain subtle political or societal commentary, although this is not a major theme. Occasionally he indulges in wryly humorous works of fantasy, but is primarily a representational artist. His published works are listed in the Catalog of the German National Library.

== Biography ==
Lohmüller was born in Gengenbach in 1943, where he grew up. In 1952 he joined the Boy Scouts. His artistic interests at the time included the sculptures and frescoes of Michelangelo, as well as classical Greek works, and the Boy Scouts illustration work of Pierre Joubert. In 1960 he moved to Paris, where he continued to study art independently. In 1961 he began an apprenticeship in Offenburg as a printer, and took an interest in the work of Caravaggio.

In 1965 he met Ute Wissing, whom he married four years later. The couple lived in Munich, Offenburg, and then Gengenbach, where their first son David was born in 1975. He began working in sculpture, and exhibiting his work to the public. Their second son Adrian was born in 1977. In 1978 he published a small art pamphlet Otto Lohmüller – portraits and acts from in 1972–1977.

Since 1982 he has illustrated songbooks, publications of poems, and books for the local Boy Scouts. In 1984 he joined the Deutscher Verband für Freikörperkultur (German Association for Free Body Culture). He founded the publishing company Zeus Press to produce art volumes of his work.

He became a Boy Scout leader, and illustrated and wrote travel reports of the "Tempelritter" (Temple Knight) troop. In 1989 he joined the Comité pour la Promotion du Scoutisme en Europe (COPSE = Committee for the Promotion of Scouting in Europe), becoming a vice-president of the organization.

== Books by Lohmüller ==
- Bildnisse und Akte 1972–1977 (Zeus Press, 1978) (30 pages, 46 illus., 22 cm)
- Ich sag ja / I say yes / Je dis oui. Porträt- und Aktzeichnungen von Jungen (Zeus Press, 1985) (69 pages, 32 full-page drawings, portraits & nude studies of boys, 31 cm)
- Species Knabe: Aktskizzen (Zeus Press, 1986) (63 full-pages illus., 24 cm)
- Kalos: Gemälde. (Zeus Press, 1987) (73 full-page col. illus. of paintings – portraits & figure studies – dating from 1973 to 1986 of boys aged 8–14 & 13 pages of sketches.
- Kalos II (84 pages, 82 illus, 30 cm)
- Faces (1990), portraits of people from the Black Forest region, as well as of other lands and continents.
