= Apama (software) =

APAMA
- Developers: Cambridge University (1999 - 2005) Progress Software (2005 - 2012) Software AG (2012 - present)
- Operating system: Windows, Linux
- License: Commercial / Freemium
- Website: apamacommunity.com

Software AG Apama, better known as Apama is an advanced complex event processing platform currently developed by Software AG to enable real-time analytics and intelligent decision-making.

== History ==
Apama Ltd. was founded in 1999 by Cambridge PHD graduates Dr John Bates and Dr Giles Nelson, who met while undertaking research at the Cambridge University Department of Computer Science and Technology.

In 2005, Apama was acquired by Progress Software for $25 million, will become part of Progress unit OBjectStore, which provides historical event data management software and reference data delivery systems.

In 2012, Apama was transferred its ownership to Software AG.

== See also ==
- Complex event processing
- Event stream processing
