= Acatech =

acatech – German Academy of Science and Engineering
- Formation: 15 February 2002
- Purpose: National academy
- Headquarters: Munich, Germany
- Members: 603 (March 2021)
- Presidents: Claudia Eckert and Thomas Weber
- Website: https://en.acatech.de/

Acatech (styled acatech), founded in 2002 and established as the German Academy of Science and Engineering (German: Deutsche Akademie der Technikwissenschaften) on 1 January 2008, represents the interests of German technical sciences independently, in self-determination and guided by the common good, at home and abroad. acatech is organized as a working academy that advises politicians and the public on forward-looking issues concerning the technical sciences and technology politics. The academy sees itself as an institution that provides neutral, fact and science-based assessments of technology-related questions and serves society with far-sighted recommendations of excellent quality. Also, acatech aims to facilitate the knowledge transfer between science and business and to promote new talent in the technical sciences. To further the acceptance of technical progress in Germany and demonstrate the potential of forward-looking technologies for the economy and for society, acatech organizes symposia, forums, panel discussions and workshops. acatech communicates with the public by publishing studies, recommendations and issue papers.

Also, in the future, the “Three Academies”, acatech, the Berlin-Brandenburg Academy of Sciences and Humanities (BBAW) and the German Academy of Sciences Leopoldina in Halle, which will act as the lead organization in this enterprise, are intended to undertake the functions of a national academy of science.

acatech, whose name stands for the combination of academia and technology, is made up of three bodies: General Assembly, Executive Board and Senate. The executive board of acatech is chaired by its presidents, Karl-Heinz Streibich and Prof. Dr. Johann-Dietrich Wörner. The acatech head office is located in Munich. In addition the academy operates offices in Berlin and Brussels. Internationally, acatech plays its role in the European Council of Applied Sciences, Technologies and Engineering (Euro-CASE) and its global equivalent, the International Council of Academies of Engineering and Technological Sciences (CAETS).

== Operation ==
The way acatech operates is characterized by its close interlinking between science and business. The paramount aim of acatech's work is to promote sustainable growth through more innovation in Germany. This entails the assessment of the potentials, chances and risks of new technical developments. Following this concept, every scientific or technical discipline that serves to produce scientific knowledge and invest that knowledge into practical uses is represented in acatech. These include the engineering sciences, but also the applied natural sciences and parts of the humanities and social sciences. acatech is organized as a flexible, working academy, so that the members can engage in topical networks and projects and thus determine the contents of their work. Every distinguished scientist from academia or industry can become a member of acatech. The co-option of new members is decided, on recommendation, by the executive board and the General Assembly. Presently, acatech has about 600 members, each of them involved in the development of projects and engaged in the topical networks of the academy. The selection of topical fields and projects is decided by the executive board.

To foster the quality of coverage relating to technology issues, acatech founded the PUNKT prize in 2005. Distinguished examples of journalism in the field of photography, text and multimedia in Germany are eligible for the PUNKT. The prize is awarded yearly.

== Structure ==
Acatech is governed by three organs: the General Assembly, the Executive Board and the Senate. There is also a Board of Trustees.

The Executive Board represents acatech and defines the guidelines for the contents of the work undertaken by members in project groups and topical networks. The honorary members of the executive board are elected by the General Assembly, for a period of three years. The members of Board elect the presidents. The incumbent presidents of acatech are Karl-Heinz Streibich and Prof. Dr. Johann-Dietrich Wörner.

The Senate advises acatech on questions of strategy. Its members are CEOs and chairmen of major technological corporations, presidents of the main science organizations in Germany, such as the Fraunhofer Society, the German Research Foundation (DFG), the Leibniz-Gemeinschaft and representatives from politics. The Senate is currently chaired by Karl-Heinz Streibich, President of acatech.

Corporations and private individuals are affiliated in the Board of Trustees, which engages in the interest of acatech and supports the work of acatech with grants and donations. The chairman of the Board of Trustees is Prof. Dr. Henning Kagermann, Global Representative and Advisor of the Plattform Industrie 4.0 and former Chief Executive Officer of SAP AG.

acatech operates a head office at the Residenz in Munich and branch offices in Berlin and Brussels. The employees at the three offices work to support the organs of acatech in their activities.

== Results ==
Acatech publishes the results of its scientific work in three series of monographs:

- Position Statements
- Project Reports
- acatech debates

Apart from that, acatech also publishes annual reports and a newsletter, TRANSFER.

Position Statements – “acatech takes a position”: This is the format of brief statements on current issues from the fields of technical sciences and technology politics. The statements are drawn up by leading experts for the respective subjects and are authorized by the acatech Executive Board. They are published by acatech.

Project Reports – “acatech reports and advises”: In this series, the results achieved by acatech project groups are reported. The reports are of the form of studies developed by interdisciplinary working groups in projects lasting one or several years and resulting in specific recommendations for action. Each project report is authorized by the executive board and published by acatech.

“acatech debates”: This series reports about symposia, workshops and other projects whose results do not have the status of official, authorized recommendations by acatech. The responsibility for the contents of these publications lies with the individual publishers and authors.

Apart from these series, acatech publishes an Annual Report, each spring, documenting the main activities and events of the past year. The quarterly newsletter, TRANSFER, offers up-to-date information about events, news and current affairs.

== History ==
The idea to create a national academy of sciences to represent the interests of the technical sciences in Germany is not exactly new. However, in contrast to other European countries, e.g. the United Kingdom with its “Royal Society”, France with the “Académie des Sciences” or Sweden with the “Royal Swedish Academy of Sciences”, the idea of national academies, generally, did not come to fruition in Germany for a long time. Consequently, there was no such superordinate representation of the technical sciences, either.

The first important step towards an integrated representation of the technical sciences was made only after years of discussion, on 21 November 1997. That was the day of the constituting session of the “Convent for the Technical Sciences”. This convent came into existence thanks to the initiative of the Berlin-Brandenburg and North Rhine-Westphalia academies of sciences. The inaugural assembly elected Professor Dr.-Ing. Günter Spur as chairman of the executive board of the convent. The members, initially just 50 in number, in their majority came from the technical sciences, natural sciences, engineering sciences and economics faculties of the two founding academies.

Right from the beginnings, the tasks to be undertaken by the Convent for the Technical Sciences included the promotion of research and new talent in the technical sciences; the strengthening of international cooperation; and the dialog with the natural sciences and humanities, politics, business and society about the role of forward-looking technologies.

To provide a broader base for development of the Convent for the Technical Sciences, the presidents of the, then, seven academies of sciences in Germany, agreed in April 2001 to bundle all national technical-sciences activities under the umbrella of the Union of the German Academies of Sciences and Humanities. So, on 15 February 2002 the “Convent for the Technical Sciences of the Union of the German Academies of Sciences” was established and subsequently incorporated and registered as an associated for the common public good. The chairmanship of the executive board was awarded to Joachim Milberg, with Franz Pischinger as his deputy. (The two functions were renamed, by change of statute, to president and vice president, respectively, in May 2003.) The Convent decided to operate the snappy short name, “akatech”, which, in view of the international context of its functions, was subsequently changed into “acatech”.

The breakthrough for the Convent to become a national academy was marked by the decision by the Federal and State Governments’ Commission (Bund-Länder-Kommission, BLK) of 23 October 2006, to accept acatech into the common institutional funding framework of the Federal and State governments of Germany. On 23 April 2007, the BLK issued the recommendation to the “heads of government of the Bund and the Länder to implement an amendment to the framework agreement for research funding”. In its reasoning for this decision, the BLK emphasized that the technical sciences are an important pillar in the “science landscape” and commended the concept of acatech as a convincing basis for the work of an independent, national academy of the technical sciences. Since 1 January 2008, acatech operates under the name “German Academy of Science and Engineering”.
