= Igersheim =

- Municipality
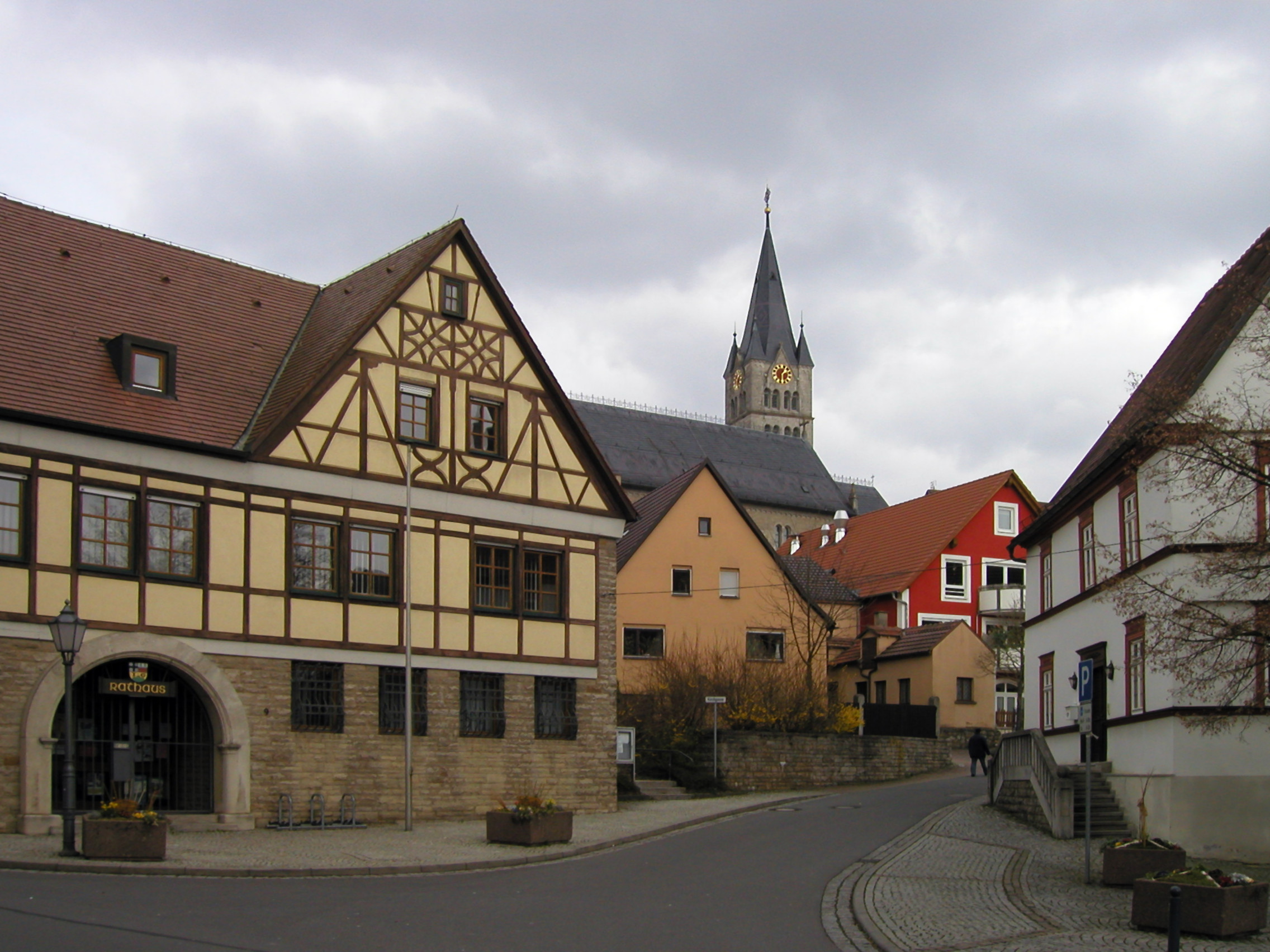
- Town hall and church

- Coat of arms

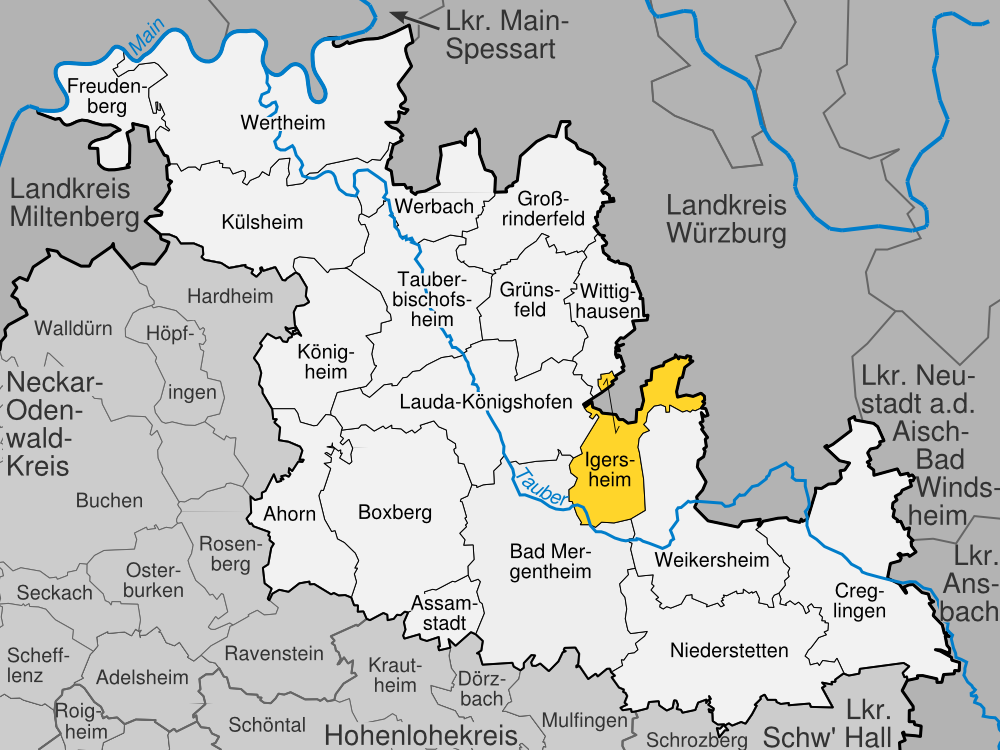
- Location of Igersheim within Main-Tauber-Kreis district
- Interactive map of Igersheim
- Location within Germany Location within Baden-Württemberg
- Coordinates: 49°29′35″N 09°49′00″E
- Country: Germany
- State: Baden-Württemberg
- Admin. region: Stuttgart
- District: Main-Tauber-Kreis

Government
  - Mayor (2024–32): Frank Menikheim

Area
  - Total: 42.84 km^{2} (16.54 sq mi)
- Elevation: 212 m (696 ft)

Population (2025-12-31)
  - Total: 5,479
  - Density: 127.9/km^{2} (331.2/sq mi)
- Time zone: UTC+01:00 (CET)
  - Summer (DST): UTC+02:00 (CEST)
- Postal codes: 97999, 97957 (Bowiesen)
- Dialling codes: 07931, 09336 (Bernsfelden, Simmringen), 09347 (Bowiesen)
- Vehicle registration: TBB, MGH
- Website: www.igersheim.de

Igersheim is a municipality in the Main-Tauber district in the German state of Baden-Württemberg.

== History ==
Igersheim is mentioned in chronicles as early as 1090. Since 1972 Bernsfelden, Harthausen, Neuses and Simmringen belong to Igersheim.

=== Inhabitants ===
- 1880: 982
- 2005: 5.709
- 2013: 5.504

== Sights ==
=== Johann-Adam-Möhler-Haus ===
In this house Johann Adam Möhler was born. He is one of the famous people from Igersheim.

=== Burg Neuhaus castle ===
It was built in the 13th century. The 1st documentation of the castle dates the year 1281. It was destroyed and rebuilt in both the German Peasants' War and the Schmalkaldic War.

Today it is a place for horse breeding and middle age reenactment events.
