= Software AG =

German software producer

- Company type: Private
- Industry: Computer software
- Founded: 1969; 57 years ago
- Headquarters: Darmstadt, Germany
- Products: Digital Transformation software and consulting including ARIS, Adabas & Natural
- Revenue: ▲€958.2 million (2022)
- Operating income: ▼€75.6 million (2022)
- Net income: ▼€19.2 million (2022)
- Total assets: ▲€2678.4 million (2022)
- Total equity: ▲€1511.2 million (2022)
- Owner: Silver Lake (2023–present)
- Number of employees: 2000 (FTE, 2022)
- Website: www.softwareag.com

Software GmbH, trading as Software AG, is a German multinational software corporation that develops enterprise software for business process management, integration, and big data analytics. Founded in 1969, the company is headquartered in Darmstadt, Germany, and has offices worldwide.

In 2023, Silver Lake and Bain Capital made separate offers to buy the German company. In June, Software AG had most of its controlling interest acquired by Silver Lake, in a deal valued at 2.4 billion euros.

== History ==
The company was founded in 1969 by six young employees at the consulting firm AIV (Institut für Angewandte Informationsverarbeitung). One of the founders was the mathematician Peter Schnell, who later became chairman of the board for many years.

ADABAS was launched in 1971 as a high-performance transactional database management system. In 1979, Natural, a 4GL application development English-like language, that was mainly developed by Peter Pagé, was launched. The company continued to open offices and subsidiaries in North America (1971), Japan (1974), UK (1977), France (1983), Spain (1984), Switzerland, Austria, Belgium, and Saudi Arabia (1985).

By 1987, Software AG had around 500 employees, 12 subsidiaries in Europe and offices in more than 50 countries. In 1999, Software AG was listed on Frankfurt Stock Exchange and soon after the company released Tamino Information Server and Tamino XML Server.

In January 2005, Software AG acquired Sabratec Ltd, a privately held legacy integration vendor headquartered in Israel. This was followed by the acquisition of its Israeli distributor SPL Software in March 2007 and the application modernization business of another Israeli company, Jacada in December 2007, which formed the basis for its research and development center in Israel.

The company launched Centrasite SOA Governance platform in 2006 and with the $546M acquisition of U.S. rival webMethods in 2007 Software AG became active in the enterprise service bus, business process management and service-oriented architecture (SOA) product space.

In July 2009, it announced a takeover offer for the Germany-based company IDS Scheer AG. Since February 2010, IDS Scheer is part of the Software AG Group. In October 2010, the company acquired New Jersey–based Data Foundations, a leading master data management provider.

In May 2011, Software AG acquired Terracotta, Inc. and Metismo Ltd. Terracotta Inc is in the field of in-memory technology for high-performance applications and cloud services.

In April 2012, Software AG (SAG) announced buying the British technology provider my-Channels. With it, Software AG gained in-house access to universal messaging technology that allowed the company to transfer their data streams quickly and safely to the cloud and mobile applications.

In March 2013, SAG invested in Berlin-based company metaquark, which is specialized in mobile software – the aim is to jointly develop the webMethods Mobile Suite. In April, Software AG bought the US cloud platform provider LongJump, which offers modules and templates for building and running business applications in the public or private cloud settings.

On June 13, 2013, it acquired alfabet AG, a software provider of enterprise architecture and IT portfolio management. Then SAG announced purchased the Apama Complex Event Processing platform of Progress Software; the platform provides an environment for the design and operation of CEP applications providing tools and graphical analysis and test capabilities for analysts, developers and administrators.

In August 2013, Software AG acquired JackBe to serve as the foundation for its Intelligent Business Operations Platform, which provides analytics and decision management for real-time applications. In December, Software AG invested in big data analytics company Datameer, which offers self-service Big Data Analytics and "to follow cutting edge technology trends".

On March 27, 2017, SAG announced the acquisition of Cumulocity GmbH, based in Düsseldorf, Germany. On June 12, 2018, Software AG acquired the Belgian self-service analytics company, TrendMiner NV., a specialist in virtual data analysis for the manufacturing and process industry.

In April 2023, private equity firm Silver Lake agreed to buy the company for €2.2 billion (US$2.4 billion). Silver Lake was outbid by Bain Capital in a non-binding counteroffer through its portfolio company Rocket Software, but Software AG's board and management supported the original offer citing its higher likelihood to go through and since it would remain an independent company. In June 2023, Silver Lake secured 63% of Software AG. Later that year, Software AG agreed to sell its StreamSets and webMethods platforms to IBM for $2.33 billion.

During 2024, the company was reorganized from a stock corporation (AG, "Aktiengesellschaft") to a company with limited liability (GmbH, "Gesellschaft mit beschränkter Haftung"). As a result, it changed its logo and other branding slightly, and now refers to itself as "Software AG, a Software GmbH Brand".

Following the acquisition by Silver Lake, Software AG sold or divested the majority of its portfolio, including the sale of Alfabet and Cumulocity to an undisclosed buyer or buyers. In 2025, Software AG announced their intention to spin off the remaining two products, ARIS, and Adabas & Natural, as two separate businesses. The company also announced in January 2025 that Sanjay Brahmawar was stepping down as CEO and four executives had been appointed to lead Software AG's holding company, Software GmbH—Martin Biegel, Martin Clemm, Robin Colman, and Toktam Khatibzadeh.

=== Corruption allegations ===
In July 2017 allegations emerged in South Africa that Software AG made "kickback" payments by entering into questionable commission agreements with a Gupta-controlled company in the hope of securing lucrative state contracts. "Software AG [launched] an internal investigation after a media report alleged it had paid kickbacks as part of a wide-ranging South African scandal..."

== Products ==
Software AG markets software products in technologies like DBMS, application modernization, SOA, BPMS and ESB. Below are a few of their products on the market.

- ADABAS – a high performance transactional database management system
- ARIS – acquired business process analysis platform. A free version is available as ARIS Express.
- Centrasite – a flagship SOA governance application which provides UDDI as well as governance
- CONNX - Data Access, Data Movement (ETL), Streaming Analytics
- Natural – an English-like fourth-generation programming language for application development
- NaturalONE – Eclipse-based integrated development environment natural applications
- Presto – Self-service, real-time data visualization and exploration tool combines data from different applications to create mashups, which can be displayed on any device.
- TrendMiner – an industrial analytics platform. It offers self-service descriptive, diagnostic, and predictive analytics on time-series data to find root causes and detect anomalies.

=== Former ===
- Tamino Information Server – Information server based on XML for the storage, management and transfer of structured and unstructured data, now called webMethods Tamino
- Terracotta, Inc. – Company behind opensource Ehcache. Big memory, Quartz scheduler are their primary products. My-Channel's Nirvana messaging is now offered as Terracotta Universal Messaging.
- webMethods – an ESB, API Management, BPMS, SOA enablement, MDM and B2B integration
- Cumulocity IoT – an IoT product, providing hardware, Cloud and Edge Services as well as platforms adaptable to the Software AG Cloud
- Apama – Platform for streaming analytics and intelligent automated action on fast-moving big data. Combines event processing, messaging, in-memory data management and visualization.
- Alfabet – IT Planning, Portfolio Management, and Enterprise Architecture Software

== Communities ==
Software AG uses two main customer communities: the ARIS Community, for the user group around ARIS, and the TECHcommunity, for collaboration around Adabas & Natural. In August 2021, Software AG introduced its virtual platform Software AG Groups.

The Software AG University Relations Program organizes events and features free education packages made for remote learning. In an effort to build an academic user group, students gain free access to software, video tutorials and online training with the option to get certified upon completion.

In 2022, Software AG partnered with the all electric ERA Championship as a title sponsor, implementing solutions regarding data and utilizing the series as a platform for the company's ESG initiatives.
