= Wolfgang Bibel =

German computer scientist

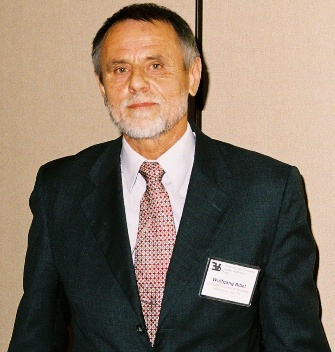
- At the 2006 Federated Logic Conference
- Born: 1938 (age 87–88); Nuremberg
- Education: LMU Munich
- Scientific career
- Institutions: Technische Universität Darmstadt
- Thesis: Schnittelimination in einem Teilsystem der einfachen Typenlogik (1968)
- Doctoral advisor: Kurt Schütte, Helmuth Gericke
- Notable students: Holger H. Hoos

Leonhard Wolfgang Bibel (born on 28 October 1938 in Nuremberg) is a German computer scientist, mathematician and Professor emeritus at the Department of Computer Science of the Technische Universität Darmstadt. He was one of the founders of the research area of artificial intelligence in Germany and Europe and has been named as one of the ten most important researchers in German artificial intelligence history by the Gesellschaft für Informatik. Bibel established the necessary institutions, conferences and scientific journals and promoted the necessary research programs to establish the field of artificial intelligence.

Bibel has worked in the fields of automated deduction, knowledge representation, architecture of deductive systems and inference, planning, learning, program synthesis, as well as on topics concerning the implications of AI technology for society. His most outstanding scientific contribution was his connection method, which allows logical conclusions to be drawn automatically in a very compact way. Bibel received the 2006 Herbrand Award for Distinguished Contributions to Automated Reasoning.

== Life ==
Wolfgang Bibel was born in Nuremberg, Germany. Before his studies, he had to demonstrate industrial experience, which is why he completed an internship at a large power plant in Franken. Finally, in 1958, he began studying mathematics and physics at the University of Erlangen–Nuremberg, majoring in physics. The first year of his studies was a challenge for Bibel, as the content was unknown to him, unlike his fellow students who came from science schools. During his semester breaks, he completed another internship at Siemens-Schuckertwerke. He received his intermediate diploma on May 4, 1961. From 1962, he completed part of his studies at Heidelberg University. With the change of his focus to mathematics, he moved to LMU Munich, where he studied until 1964 and obtained his diploma in mathematics. His diploma thesis dealt with the proof of Remmert's theorem of illustration. From 1964 to 1966, he was then a scientific assistant at the Max Planck Institute for Physics and Astrophysics in Munich, then headed by Werner Heisenberg. At the Max Planck Institute he met Peter Mittelstaedt, who offered him a scholarship and supervision. Mittelstaedt proposed to Bibel to work on the solution to the problem of reversal in scattering theory for his doctoral thesis but it later became known that the solution had long since been found. At the time, Mittelstaedt had not been aware of this. Later it turned out that Mittelstaedt had accepted a professorship at the University of Cologne. Bibel moved with Mittelstaedt to the University of Cologne, where he worked as a scientific assistant. The solution already found, the suddenly accepted professorship of Mittelstaedt and the distance to his girlfriend led to his resignation after a short time. In 1968 he received his doctorate with cum laude in mathematical logic under the supervision of Kurt Schütte from LMU.

=== Habilitation procedure at the Technical University of Munich ===
From 1969 to 1987, he was scientific assistant at the Institute of Computer Science at the Technical University of Munich (TUM). Actually, Bibel intended to habilitate at the university. In December 1974 he submitted his habilitation thesis for examination. His supervisor was Klaus Samelson. Surprisingly, however, Friedrich Ludwig Bauer, who headed the institute at the time, vetoed his habilitation, which meant he was denied eligibility, which was unusual given the accomplishments of Bibel. He recommended that he continue his research for another five years before considering a habilitation. Outside of TUM, however, his achievements were recognized, which is why he tried to initiate a habilitation procedure without Bauer's approval, as Bauer vehemently opposed it. During this period, he was appointed as a lecturer by the Department of Computer Science at the University of the Bundeswehr Munich from 1975 to 1976. In addition, in the summer semester of 1975 he represented the chair of Jacques Loeckx at Saarland University and was called upon by the Dean of the Department of Mathematics/Computer Science of Paderborn University to apply for a professorship. The chairman of the habilitation commission was Karl Heinz Helwig, who appointed reviewers who had no knowledge of his subject, automated theorem proving. He then turned to the then President of the Technical University of Munich, Ulrich Grigull, but without success. According to Bibel's impression, Grigull said that tradition needed no explanation and that he should have listened to Bauer. During this time, Bibel held further positions and obtained additional opinions, which were positive. These included assessments by Bruno Buchberger and Woody Bledsoe, but in 1977 his application was rejected with 31 dissenting votes and 3 abstentions. Out of desperation, he tried to withdraw the motion. He knew only a few reasons for his rejection from indiscreet discussions. However, he did not get insight into the reasons for the rejection. An application for inspection of documents also failed, which is why he filed a lawsuit, in which he proved errors in the content of the reports. The complaints were dismissed in 1982, as the procedure had been formally correct, so that his habilitation procedure ended after seven proceedings. During this time the attitude of his colleagues towards him changed, which he describes as "hostile". In 1978, he applied for another habilitation, as there was a change in the law that allowed senior assistants to take up a professorship. This was also rejected in 1980 on the grounds that there was no need in his field. The whole thing Bibel described as an attempt to "academically liquidate" him and he said that Bauer, in his opinion, was obsessed with power and was against Bibel for personal reasons. Bauer and his colleagues rejected the subject and could not identify themselves with Bibel's scientific approach. Bauer was an advocate of imperative programming with ALGOL, and Bibel relied on logic programming with PROLOG. Later Bauer recognized functional and object-oriented programming with LISP, which was represented by Wolfgang Wahlster. Bauer, in particular, did not believe in the future of the field. At that time, the rejection of artificial intelligence was based in Munich and extended beyond it. Wahlster also described Bauer's approach as driven by ideology. In the same year in which the habilitation failed, the German Research Foundation (DFG), at the request of the Bibel, supported the project "Use of Evidence Procedures in Programming". The topic was dominated by the topic of the failed habilitation, which is why Bauer was also outraged about the funding, so that access to the computers of TUM had been blocked. The problem could only be solved with the intervention of the then DFG President. For example, Eickel, who was one of the reviewers and part of Bauer's group, was habilitated, although at the time he only had one publication with three other authors. This approach had led to the fact that large IT companies such as SAP, Software AG and Scheer AG did not emerge from TUM. Andreas von Bechtolsheim was also bored and angry from his studies, which is why he moved to Carnegie Mellon University. The history spread and made his life more difficult. Bauer had a great influence in computer science in Germany at that time. Bibel wrote 26 unsuccessful applications. In the following years Bibel tried to keep his time in Munich to the minimum. The event shaped Bibel and the assessment of Bauer and his colleagues turned out to be wrong.

In the academic year 1970/1971, he was Assistant Professor of Computer Science at the computer science section of the Mathematics Department of the Wayne State University in Detroit. In 1985, he was Visiting Associate Professor at the Duke University. He declined offers from the Technische Universität Berlin, Vrije Universiteit Amsterdam, Technische Universität Wien and the University of Ulm.

=== Time after TU Munich ===
In 1987, he became Professor of Computer Science at the University of British Columbia in Vancouver and one year later Adjunct Professor, an honorary title awarded to him by the university, because he then moved to the Technische Universität Darmstadt.

In the winter semester 1985/1986, Bibel represented the chair he was later appointed to for the first time. On October 1, 1988 he became Professor of Intellectics at then Department of Computer Science of the Technische Universität Darmstadt. At this time Bibel was already 50. The TU Darmstadt was the 16th employer and also the last of Bibel. It was also the first stable and appropriate working environment for Bibel. For the academic year 1991/1992 he took over the office as Dean of the Department of Computer Science of the TU Darmstadt. During this time he led three appointment commissions. Among them were Oskar von Stryk and Karsten Weihe. In his time, he also built up his research group and made the TU Darmstadt one of the leading universities for artificial intelligence worldwide. The most outstanding scientific project was the National Priority Programme Deduction, funded by the German Research Foundation (DFG). The project led to Germany assuming a leading position in artificial intelligence. He has been Professor emeritus since 2004.

At the request of Bibel, Wolfgang Wahlster received his first honorary doctorate from the TU Darmstadt and John Alan Robinson the Humboldt Prize in 1994, which included a six-month stay at the Technical University of Darmstadt. By 2017, twenty-five of his doctoral students or staff were professors. He worked as Section Editor of the journal Artificial Intelligence.

== Contribution to Artificial Intelligence in Germany and Europe ==
Contrary to the difficulties at the Technical University of Munich (TUM), he continued his research in his field. The year 1975 can be regarded as the starting shot for artificial intelligence in Germany. Gerd Veenker called a meeting in Bonn in which Wolfgang Bibel and Wolfgang Wahlster also took part. As a result of the meeting they established the newsletter KI, which later became the magazine KI. The first six issues were issued by Hans-Hellmut Nagel. From the seventh issue onwards, Bibel took over for two years until 1998. During this time he received no support from TUM, so he had to do all the work. At the meeting it was also decided to set up a subcommittee for artificial intelligence in the technical committee Cognitive Systems in the Gesellschaft für Informatik, to which Bibel belonged as a member since 1975. The chairman was Hans-Hellmut Nagel, who at that time was the only professor on the highest level who confessed to artificial intelligence. This committee coordinated the establishment of artificial intelligence as a scientific discipline in Germany. Later, Bibel took over the role. He also held this position for the longest time. In 1975, he organized a workshop on automatic evidence, which was internationally acclaimed in science and business. The workshop was a precursor to today's German Conference on Artificial Intelligence. In 1982, together with Jörg Siekmann, he founded the two-week KI Spring School (KIFS), as the research results had not yet reached the students. This resulted in one of the first books on artificial intelligence in Germany, which brought students closer to the topic. Today the school is a permanent institution. In 1985 he also offered the first Advanced Course on AI (ACAI), the equivalent of the KIFS for Europe. This also resulted in another book. Bibel wanted to found a European organisation for artificial intelligence as early as 1979. 1982 saw the first European Conference on Artificial Intelligence and the founding of the European Coordinating Committee for Artificial Intelligence, today's European Association for Artificial Intelligence (EurAI). He became its first president. During the whole time he had no professorship and no support from TUM, because they refused it.

In 1975, the German Research Foundation (DFG) approved Bibel an application for a research grant. Bibel also procured several research projects for the TU Darmstadt, including the national priority program Deduction, which was approved in autumn 1991. The project led to Germany assuming a leading position in artificial intelligence.

At the International Joint Conference on Artificial Intelligence (IJCAI) in 1977, he presented with Nagel for the first time the situation of artificial intelligence in Germany. From 1986 to 1992 he was a member of the board of directors of IJCAI and from 1987 to 1989 its president. Bibel's influence at that time also led Japan to launch a research program for a whole decade, the Fifth Generation Computer Systems (FGCS). The research programme caused a great stir, which is why personalities from the world of politics attended the conference in Japan in 1979. Bibel represented Germany at the conference. The conference was followed by other major research programmes such as the European Strategic Programme for Research and Development in Information Technology and the Information Technology Programme funded by the Federal Ministry of Research and Technology (BMFT).

In 1984 Bibel turned to Franz-Josef Strauss to point out the growing importance of artificial intelligence. This led to the foundation of a Bavarian Research Center for Knowledge-Based Systems (BayWiss) in 1988. At the same time, the German Research Center for Artificial Intelligence was founded and the Institute for Application-Oriented Knowledge Processing (IAW) was established in Baden-Wuerttemberg.

On April 23, 2018, he initiated the events that led to the launch of the CLAIRE (Confederation of Laboratories for Artificial Intelligence Research in Europe) initiative.

== Positions ==
Wolfgang Bibel argued that the study of artificial intelligence should rather be called Intellectics.

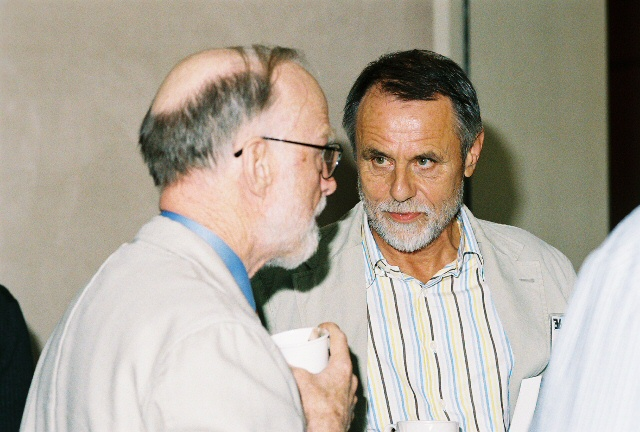
Wolfgang Bibel (on the right) with C. A. R. Hoare in 2006.

== Honours and awards ==
- First German Fellow of the Association for the Advancement of Artificial Intelligence, 1990
- Fellow of the Canadian Institutes for Advanced Research
- One of the ten most important researchers in the German artificial intelligence history by the Gesellschaft für Informatik
- Fellow of the European Association for Artificial Intelligence
- Fellow of the Gesellschaft für Informatik, 2006
- International Joint Conference on Artificial Intelligence Donald E. Walker Distinguished Service Award recipient, 1999
- International Federation for Information Processing Silver Core winner, 1998
- Herbrand Award winner, 2006
- Distinguished Service Award of the European Association for Artificial Intelligence, 2018

== Publications ==
- Bibel, Wolfgang (1987). Automated theorem proving. Braunschweig: F. Vieweg. ISBN 3-528-18520-1. OCLC 16641802.
- ——; Eric Cuvillier Firma (2017). Reflexionen vor Reflexen Memoiren eines Forschers (in German). Göttingen. ISBN 978-3-7369-9524-6. OCLC 987574903.
- Otten, Jens; —— (2003). "leanCoP: lean connection-based theorem proving". Journal of Symbolic Computation. 36 (1–2). Elsevier BV: 139–161. doi:10.1016/s0747-7171(03)00037-3. ISSN 0747-7171.
- Otten, Jens; —— (2017). "Provably Correct Systems". NASA Monographs in Systems and Software Engineering. Cham: Springer International Publishing. doi:10.1007/978-3-319-48628-4. ISBN 978-3-319-48627-7. ISSN 1860-0131. S2CID 7091220.
