= Department of Computer Science of TU Darmstadt =

Department of the Technische Universität Darmstadt

Department of Computer Science
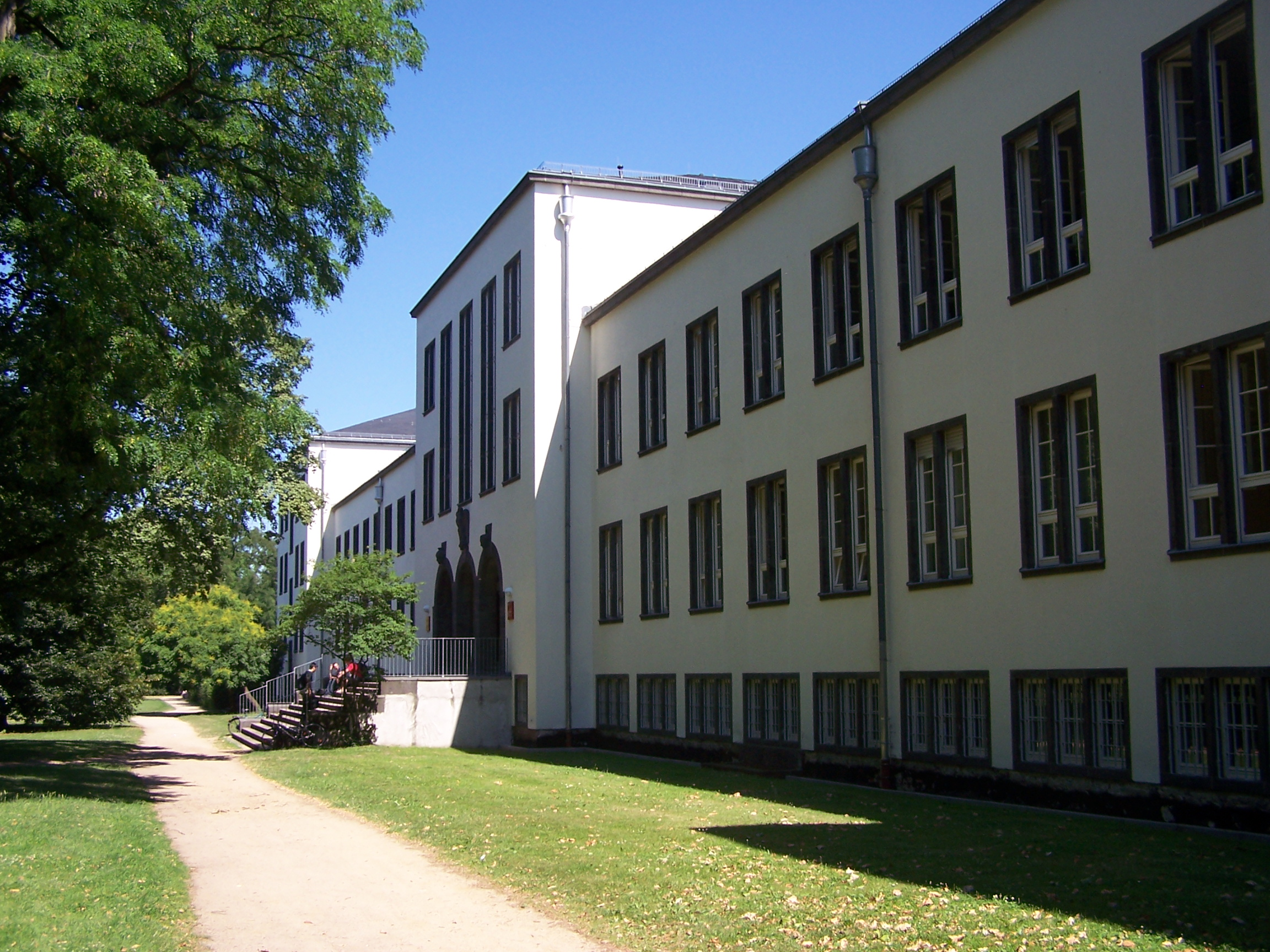
- Robert Piloty Building
- Established: 15 May 1972
- Dean: Christian Reuter
- Students: around 3,700 (2018)
- Location: Darmstadt
- Website: www.informatik.tu-darmstadt.de

The Department of Computer Science is a department of the Technische Universität Darmstadt. With a total of 36 professorships and about 3,700 students in 12 study courses, the Department of Computer Science is the largest department of the university. The department shapes the two research profile areas "Cybersecurity (CYSEC)" and "Internet and Digitization (InDi)" of the university.

Like the history of the university, the history of the department is shaped by pioneers. The beginnings of computer science, artificial intelligence and business informatics in Germany go back to the department.

== History ==
=== Beginnings of computer science in Germany ===
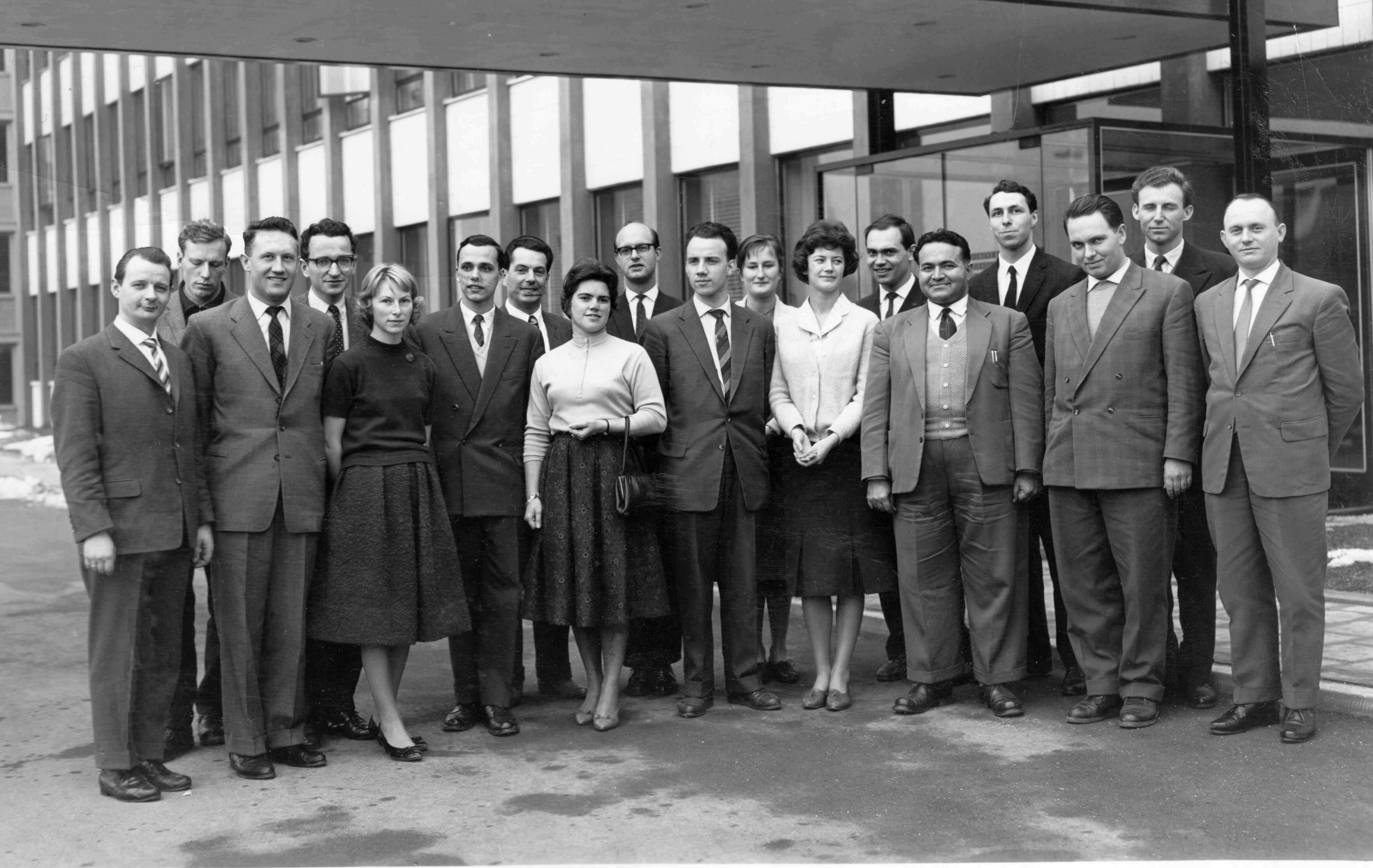
Staff of the Institute for Practical Mathematics (1960)

In 1928, Alwin Walther was appointed professor of mathematics at the Technische Hochschule Darmstadt. Walther established the Institute for Practical Mathematics (IPM) there, which was part of the Department of Mathematics and Natural Sciences. In Germany, the beginnings of computer science go back to this institute. The institute was concerned with automating computing using mechanical and electromechanical devices and developing machines that could be used to solve mathematical problems. One of the earliest results was the System Darmstadt slide rule, which was widely used in mechanical engineering. Another development was an electromechanical integration system. After the Second World War, the institute concentrated increasingly on the development of electronic computer systems. Due to the reputation that TH Darmstadt had at that time in automatic computation research, the first congress on the subject of computer science (electronic calculators and information processing) held in German-speaking countries with international participation took place at TH Darmstadt in October 1955. The Darmstadt Electronic Calculator (DERA), which was completed in 1959, was created with the help of the German Research Foundation (DFG). At that time, the computer capacity was unique in Europe. Two decades before the invention of programming languages, algorithms were tested on the computing station and successfully used to process problems from industry. In 1956, the first students at DERA were able to deal with the problems of automatic calculating machines. At the same time, the first programming lectures and practical courses were offered at TH Darmstadt. In 1957, Walther made sure that TH Darmstadt got an IBM 650, which was the most powerful computer at that time. Thus TH Darmstadt was also the first university in Germany with a mainframe computer. In 1961, in response to Walther's efforts, the German Computer Center (DRZ) was founded in Darmstadt, the first mainframe computer center in Germany with which TH Darmstadt entered into a cooperation to train mathematical-technical assistants.

Electrical engineering also had a major influence on computer science at the Technische Hochschule Darmstadt (TH Darmstadt). In 1964, Robert Piloty was appointed to the chair of data technology at TH Darmstadt. In the 1960s, Germany lacked competitiveness in the field of data processing. To counteract this, the Federal Committee for Scientific Research adopted a programme for the promotion of research and development in the field of data processing for public tasks on 26 April 1967. The advisory board, which consisted mainly of representatives of universities and non-university research institutions, was responsible for the implementation of the programme. At the seventh meeting of the advisory board on 15 November 1967, Karl Ganzhorn, who at the time was responsible for research and development at IBM Germany, signalled the problems of industry in finding skilled personnel. The director of the Institute for Information Processing at TH Darmstadt, Piloty, pointed out that the German universities were responsible for training qualified personnel. As a result, a committee was formed, which was chaired by Piloty. The committee formulated recommendations for the training of computer scientists, which provided for the establishment of a course of studies in computer science at several universities and technical colleges. At TH Darmstadt Piloty worked with Winfried Oppelt on a study plan "Computer Science", which was characterized by engineering science. There was already another curriculum with the name "Diplom-Ingenieur Informatik (Mathematik)", which came from the Faculty of Mathematics and Physics and provided for a stronger emphasis on software engineering. However, the Faculty of Electrical Engineering was the driving force, which is why in the same year the first computer science course of study in Germany was established at the Faculty of Electrical Engineering on the basis of Pilotys and Oppelts study regulations. The first diploma thesis was written in 1971, the first doctoral thesis in 1975 and the first habilitation in 1978.

In the spring of 1969, Hartmut Wedekind and Robert Piloty had travelled through the USA together for several weeks to study the faculties of computer science there. On 7 July 1969, the Founding Committee for Computer Science (GAI) was established to constitute the Department of Computer Science. Later, the committee was replaced by a provisional department conference. This conference met for the first time on 15 May 1972, so that on that day the Department of Computer Science was officially established. Wedekind became its first dean. Piloty was awarded the Konrad Zuse Medal for his achievements in 1989.

Software AG logo

In 1969, graduates of TH Darmstadt founded Software AG. Today it is one of the largest IT companies in Europe. One of the founders was Peter Schnell, who was chairman of Software AG for many years and today, with his Software AG Foundation, is one of the largest donors in Germany.

=== Business Informatics ===
The history of business informatics goes back to Peter Mertens, who studied industrial engineering at the Technische Hochschule Darmstadt (TH Darmstadt). His habilitation thesis was the first habilitation thesis on business informatics in the German-speaking world. In 1968, Peter Mertens was appointed to the first chair in the German-speaking countries focusing on economic data processing at the Johannes Kepler University Linz. In the same year, Hartmut Wedekind, former systems consultant at IBM Germany, represented the Chair of Business Administration at TH Darmstadt for the first time. Two years later, he was appointed to the Chair of Business Administration and Data Processing at TH Darmstadt. Wedekind worked on database systems and their operational applications and, as early as 1971, headed the "Data Management Systems I" research group, which dealt with databases in the operational context. It was the first larger research group to deal with the topics of business informatics. In 1976, TH Darmstadt introduced the first course of studies in business informatics in Germany.

=== Artificial Intelligence ===
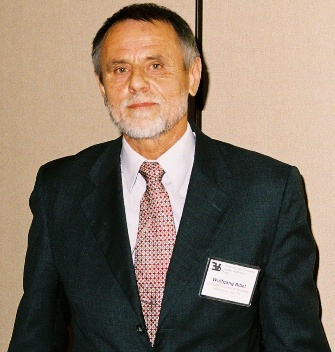
Wolfgang Bibel (2006)

The history of artificial intelligence goes hand in hand with the appointment of Wolfgang Bibel, who had been rejected by professors at the Technical University of Munich because they did not believe in the future of artificial intelligence. In the winter semester 1985/1986 Bibel represented the chair at the Technische Hochschule Darmstadt (TH Darmstadt) as deputy professor for the first time, to which the university later appointed him. Hans-Jürgen Hoffmann, Professor for Programming Languages and Translators, was involved in the deputy professorship. He accepted the call to TH Darmstadt on 1 October 1988 and became Professor of Intellectics at the Department of Computer Science. Bibel is one of the founders of artificial intelligence in Germany and Europe. He built up the necessary institutions, conferences and scientific journals and provided the necessary research programmes to establish the field of artificial intelligence. For the academic year 1991/1992 he took over the office as Dean of the Department of Computer Science of TH Darmstadt. During this time he chaired three appointment commissions. Among them were Oskar von Stryk and Karsten Weihe. In his time, he also built up his research group and made the Technische Universität Darmstadt (TU Darmstadt) one of the leading universities for artificial intelligence worldwide. The most outstanding scientific project was the National Priority Program Deduction, funded by the German Research Foundation (DFG). The project led to Germany assuming a leading position in artificial intelligence. He has been professor emeritus since 2004. He gave his farewell lecture on 13 February 2004. By 2017, twenty-five of his doctoral students or staff had become professors, so that the majority of today's German AI researchers are graduates of TU Darmstadt. For his achievements he was honored by the Gesellschaft für Informatik as one of the ten influential minds in German AI history. He was also one of the first Fellows of the Association for the Advancement of Artificial Intelligence (AAAI).

The Centre for Cognitive Science (CCS) was founded at TU Darmstadt by Constantin Rothkopf, Professor of Psychology of Information Processing. Rothkopf became its founding director. Research groups from various disciplines work at the Centre. At the same time Kristian Kersting, Professor of Artificial Intelligence and Machine Learning, founded the initiative Artificial Intelligence at TU Darmstadt (AI•DA), a unique model that coordinates different research groups to advance the development of artificial intelligence. Kersting was awarded in 2019 for his scientific achievements as a Fellow of the European Association for Artificial Intelligence (EurAI) and as a Fellow of the European Laboratory for Learning and Intelligent Systems (ELLIS).

In 2019, the TU Darmstadt was selected as a founding location of ELLIS with the aim of establishing a top AI research institute. The decision, made by international scientists, was based on the scientific excellence in the field.

=== IT Security ===
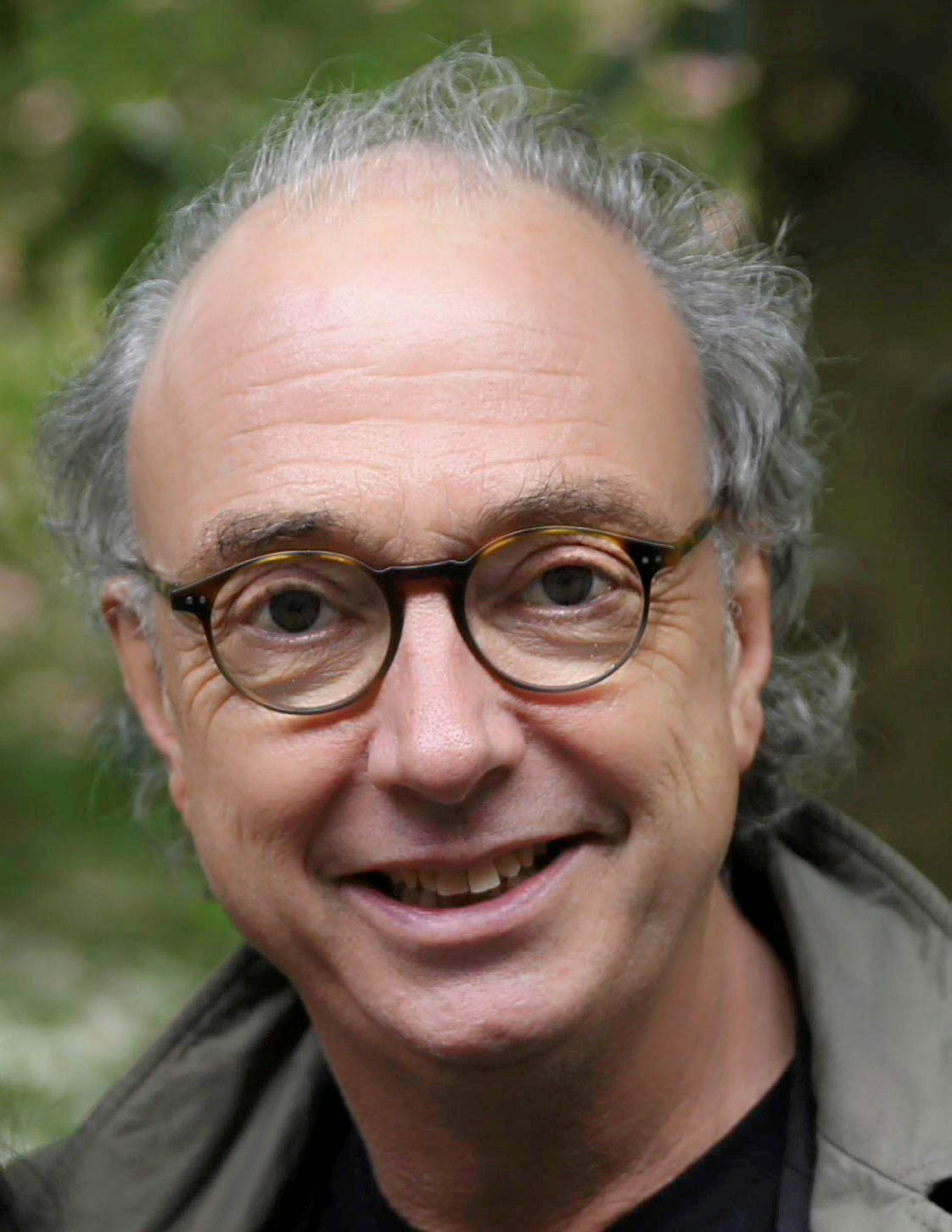
Johannes Buchmann (2016)

In 1996, Johannes Buchmann was appointed to the Chair of Theoretical Computer Science. The appointment is regarded as the birth of IT security at the Technische Hochschule Darmstadt (TH Darmstadt). Three years later, Darmstadts universities and research institutions founded the Competence Center for Applied Security Technology (CAST), the largest network for cyber security in the German-speaking world. It was initially a forum, which was transformed into an independent association in 2003. The second professorship for IT security followed in 2001. Claudia Eckert, who also headed Fraunhofer Institute for Secure Information Technology (Fraunhofer SIT) from 2001 to 2011, was appointed Professor of Information Security at the Technische Universität Darmstadt. The professorship was endowed by the Horst Görtz Foundation. IT security was institutionalized in 2002 with the founding of the Darmstadt Center for IT Security (DZI), which became the Center for Advanced Security Research Darmstadt (CASED) in 2008. Buchmann and Eckert were in charge of the project. Buchmann was the founding director of CASED. In 2010, Michael Waidner became director of Fraunhofer SIT. The European Center for Security and Privacy by Design (EC SPRIDE) was founded in 2011 as a result of the efforts of Buchmann and Waidner. CASED and EC SPRIDE were part of LOEWE, the research excellence program of the state of Hesse.

In 2012, Intel established the Intel Collaborative Research Institute for Secure Computing at the Technische Universität Darmstadt. It was the first collaborative research institute for IT security that Intel established outside the United States. Two years later, the German Research Foundation (DFG) established the Collaborative Research Centre "CROSSING – Cryptography-Based Security Solutions" at the Technische Universität Darmstadt, which deals with cryptography-based security solutions. The first speaker of CROSSING was Buchmann.

In 2015, CASED and EC SPRIDE merged to form today's Center for Research in Security and Privacy (CRISP), the largest research institution for IT security in Europe. In the same year, the German Research Foundation established the Graduate School for Privacy and Trust for Mobile Users on the initiative of Max Mühlhäuser. One year later, the Federal Ministry of Finance decided to make the Darmstadt region an outstanding location for the digital transformation of the economy. The Federal Ministry of Finance has established the centers "Digital Hub Cybersecurity" and "Digital Hub FinTech" in the region, which are to serve the networking of companies, research institutions and start-ups. CRISP was upgraded to the National Research Center for Applied Cyber Security on 1 January 2019.

Johannes Buchmann and his team founded the field of post-quantum cryptography internationally. In a worldwide competition organized by the National Institute of Standards and Technology, the XMSS signature method developed by Buchmann and his team became the first international standard for post-quantum cryptography in 2018. XMSS is the first future-proof and practical signature procedure with minimal security requirements. Buchmann was awarded the Konrad Zuse Medal in 2017 for his achievements.

==== Fraunhofer Institute in Darmstadt ====
The history of the Fraunhofer Institute for Secure Information Technology (Fraunhofer SIT) dates back to 1961, when the German Computer Center (DRZ) was founded in Darmstadt on the initiative of Alwin Walther. At that time, the German Data Center was equipped with one of the most powerful mainframe computers in Germany, making it the first mainframe data center in Germany. Particularly of the DRZ was that it could be used by universities and scientific mechanisms for research purposes. As the ARPANET became more and more widespread, communication between the machines became the focus of research at the DRZ. In 1973, the DRZ merged with other research institutions in this field to form the Gesellschaft für Mathematik und Datenverarbeitung (GMD). The Society founded the Institute for Remote Data Transmission, which was renamed the Institute for Telecooperation Technology in 1992. Under the direction of Heinz Thielmann, the Institute increasingly dealt with IT security issues and with the advent of the Internet, IT security became increasingly important, so that in 1998 it was renamed the Institute for Secure Telecooperation. In 2001 the GMD merged with the Fraunhofer Society. In 2004, the Institute for Secure Telecooperation became the Fraunhofer Institute for Secure Information Technology (Fraunhofer SIT). The founding director was Claudia Eckert, who was also Professor for Information Security at the Technische Universität Darmstadt.

=== Graphical Data Processing ===
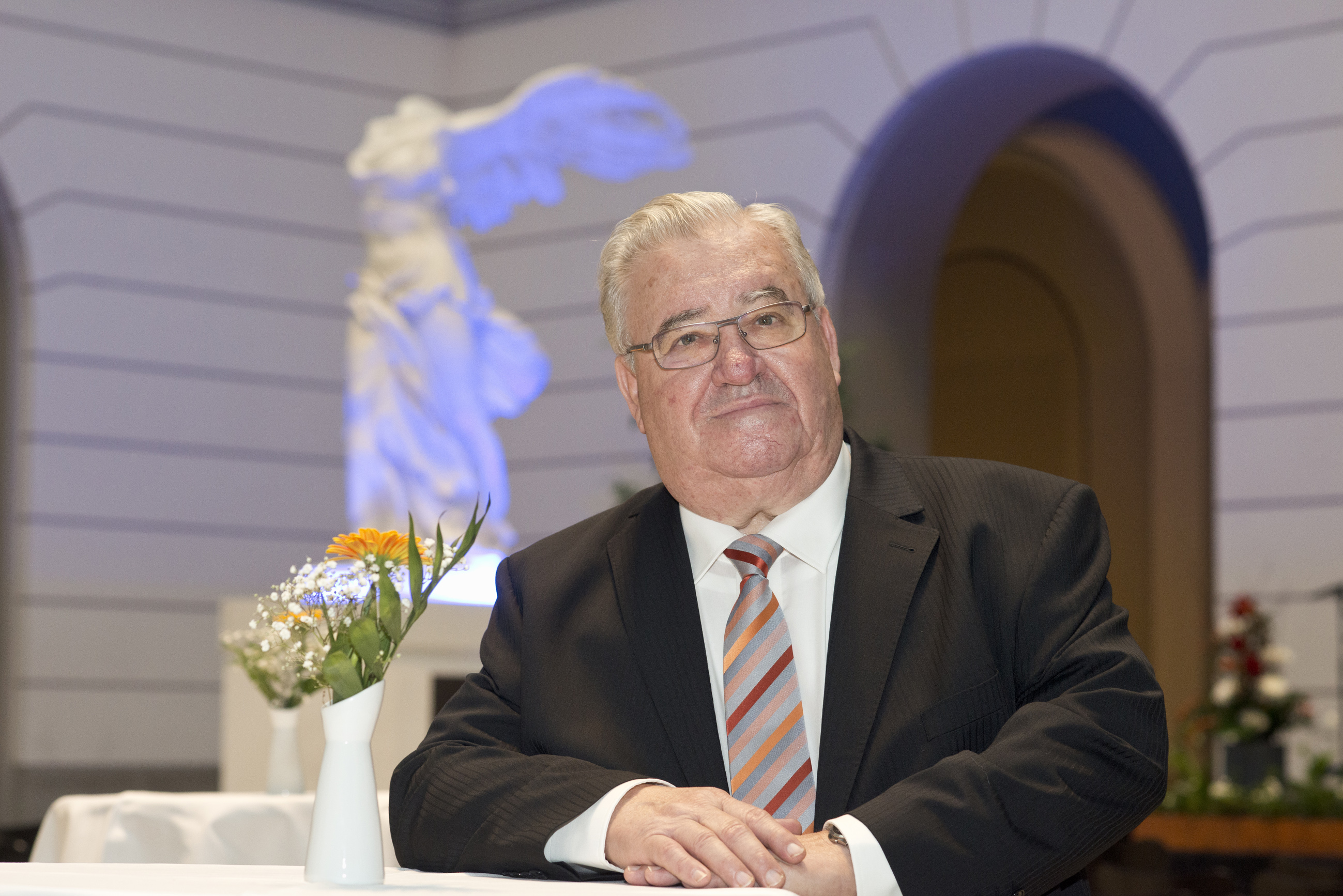
José Luis Encarnaçāo (2014)

In 1975, José Luis Encarnação founded the Research Group Graphic Interactive Systems (GRIS) at the Department of Computer Science of the Technische Hochschule Darmstadt. In 1977 he and his research group introduced the Graphical Kernel System (GKS) as the first ISO standard for computer graphics (ISO/IEC 7942). GKS allows graphics applications to run device-independently. Images can be created and manipulated and the images were portable for the first time. In 1984 Encarnação founded the Center for Computer Graphics in Darmstadt. A working group resulting from this cooperation was taken over by the Fraunhofer Society and the Fraunhofer Institute for Computer Graphics Research (Fraunhofer IGD) was founded in 1987. The founding director of the Fraunhofer IGD was José Luis Encarnação. The institute was one of the first research institutes to deal with internet technologies. José Luis Encarnação was awarded the Konrad Zuse Medal for his achievements in 1997.

== Research ==
=== Research priorities ===
The research focuses of the department include:

- Computational Engineering and Robotics
- Data Science
- IT Security
- Massively Parallel Software Systems
- Networks and Distributed Systems
- Visual Computing

=== Research grants ===
According to the funding report 2018 of the German Research Foundation (DFG), the Technische Universität Darmstadt received the highest number of competitive grants in the field of computer science in the period under review from 2014 to 2016. In a competitive selection process, the DFG selects the best research projects from researchers at universities and research institutions and finances them.

== Location ==
Technical University of Darmstadt Campus City Centre
Technical University of Darmstadt Campus City Centre
1 Mensa (canteen)
2 Library
3 Audimax (largest lecture hall)
4 Altes Hauptgebäude (old main building)
5 Human Sciences
6 Mechanical Engineering
7 Center for Cybersecurity and Privacy Research
8 Mathematics
9 Physics
10 Computer Science
11 History and Social Sciences
12 Electrical Engineering and Information Technology

The Department of Computer Science is spread over several locations, but the buildings are located in or around the city center of Darmstadt.

== Contests ==
The search and rescue robot Hector (Heterogeneous Cooperating Team Of Robots) of the Technische Universität Darmstadt competed in 2014 in the category "Rescue Robot" in the RoboCup, the oldest and world's largest competition for intelligent robots in various application scenarios, and took first place there.

In 2017, the Argonaut robot, developed by a team led by Oskar von Stryk, won the ARGOS Challenge for intelligent inspection robots on oil and gas platforms, which the company Total S.A. had launched. The prize was half a million euros. Argonaut is a variant of Taurob tracker and the first fully autonomous, mobile inspection robot for oil and gas plants.

In 2018, Hector competed at the World Robot Summit in Tokyo in the category "Plant Disaster Prevention Challenge" and won 1st place.

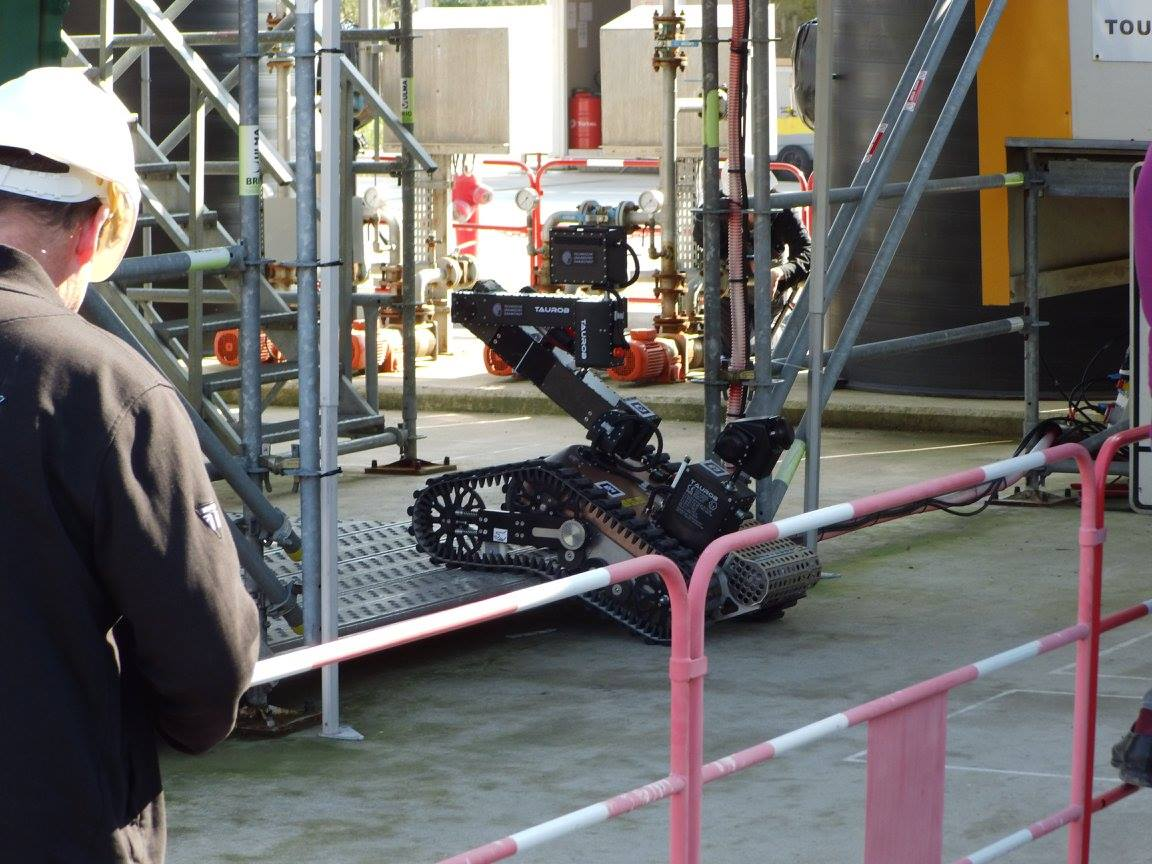
Robot Argonaut at the ARGOS Challenge
