= Kristian Kersting =

German computer scientist

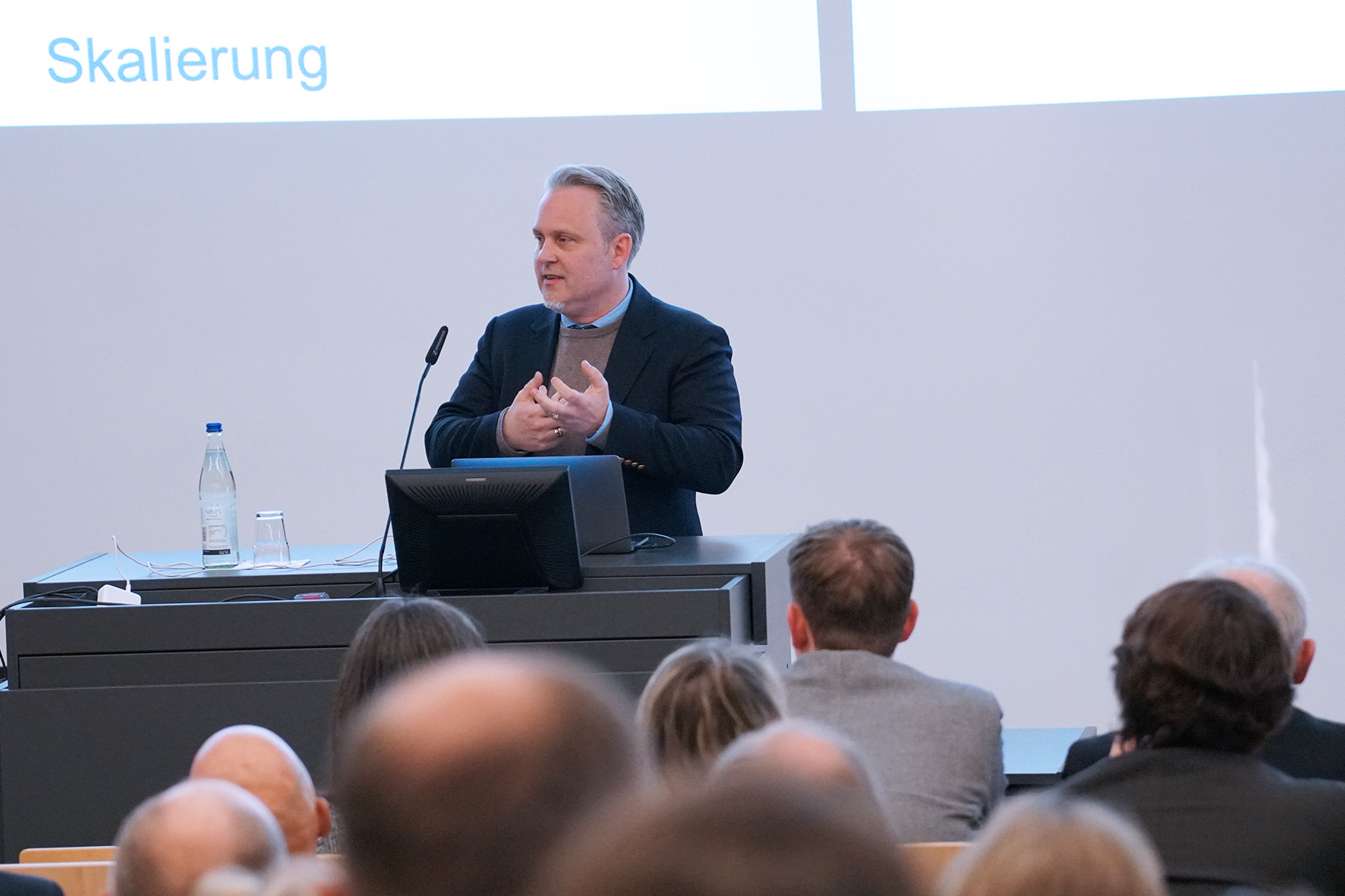
- Kersting at the University of Bamberg (2024)
- Born: November 28, 1973 (age 52); Cuxhaven, Germany
- Citizenship: German
- Education: University of Freiburg
- Scientific career
- Fields: Artificial intelligence
- Workplaces: Technische Universität Darmstadt
- Doctoral advisor: Luc De Raedt

Kristian Kersting (born November 28, 1973, in Cuxhaven, Germany) is a German computer scientist. He is Professor of Artificial intelligence and Machine Learning at the Department of Computer Science at the Technische Universität Darmstadt, Head of the Artificial Intelligence and Machine Learning Lab (AIML) and Co-Director of hessian.AI, the Hessian Center for Artificial Intelligence.

He is known for his research on statistical relational artificial intelligence, probabilistic programming, and deep probabilistic learning.

== Life ==
Kersting studied computer science at the University of Freiburg, where he received his Ph.D. in 2006. At the university he attended a course on artificial intelligence given by Bernhard Nebel and became interested in the topic. He was a visiting postdoctoral researcher at the KU Leuven and a postdoctoral associate at the Massachusetts Institute of Technology (MIT). His advisor at MIT was Leslie Pack Kaelbling. From 2008 to 2012, he led a research group at the Fraunhofer Institute for Intelligent Analysis and Information Systems (IAIS). He then became a Juniorprofessor at the University of Bonn and associate Professor at the computer science department of the Technical University of Dortmund. From 2017 to 2019, he was professor of machine Learning and since 2019 professor of artificial intelligence and machine learning at the department of computer science of the Technische Universität Darmstadt.

He is also a researcher at ATHENE, the largest research institute for IT security in Europe and leads a research department at the German Research Centre for Artificial Intelligence (DFKI).

Kristian Kersting is the co-spokesperson of Cluster of Excellence "Reasonable Artificial Intelligence", RAI (2026-32).

== Awards ==
In 2006, he received the AI Dissertation Award of the European Association for Artificial Intelligence. In 2008, he received the Fraunhofer Attract research grant with a budget of 2.5 million euros over five years. He was appointed Fellow of the European Association for Artificial Intelligence (EurAI) and Fellow of the European Laboratory for Learning and Intelligent Systems (ELLIS) in 2019. In 2019 he received the "Deutscher KI-Preis" ("German AI Award"), endowed with 100,000 euros, for his outstanding scientific achievements in the field of artificial intelligence. He was elected an AAAI Fellow in 2024.

== Publications ==
- De Raedt L., Kersting K. (2008) Probabilistic Inductive Logic Programming. In: De Raedt L., Frasconi P., Kersting K., Muggleton S. (eds) Probabilistic Inductive Logic Programming. Lecture Notes in Computer Science, vol 4911. Springer, Berlin, Heidelberg. ISBN 978-3-540-78651-1
- Luc De Raedt, Kristian Kersting, Sriraam Natarajan and David Poole, "Statistical Relational Artificial Intelligence: Logic, Probability, and Computation", Synthesis Lectures on Artificial Intelligence and Machine Learning" Morgan & Claypool, March 2016 ISBN 9781627058414.
