= Taurob Inspector =

Offshore robot for oil and gas sites

- Manufacturer: Taurob GmbH
- Year of creation: 2018; 8 years ago
- Derived from: Taurob Tracker
- Website: taurob.com/taurob-inspector/

Taurob Inspector is an ATEX certified mobile robot, developed and manufactured by the Austrian company Taurob GmbH. The Inspector was developed from the Taurob Tracker as part of the OGRIP (Offshore Ground Robotics Industrial Pilot) project.

== History ==
=== Project inception ===
With Taurob's victory in the ARGOS challenge, the commercially available Taurob Tracker in addition to the ARGOS robot were evaluated for operational use within an Oil & Gas environment. From this evaluation the foundation specification for the Taurob Inspector was created with the first prototypes being developed in early 2018.

=== First deployments ===
Taurob inspects are currently being operated on a 12-month deployment on Total Energies' Shetland Gas Plant.

==== World first offshore deployment ====
The first ever offshore deployment of an ATEX certified robot in 2020 on Total Energies' K5 gas field 110km off the coast of the Netherlands.

=== Production centre ===
In 2021 Taurob opened a subsidiary for the serial manufacture of robots - "Taurob Services S.A.S" with partner Dietsmann Smart Labs, a 100% subsidiary of Dietsmann NV. The subsidiary is based in Salies-du-Salat, France and is housed within Dietsmann's 24,000m² engineering and construction site. The inspector is the first robot to be produced by this venture, with the first robots leaving the production line in Q3 2021.

== Technical specification ==
Weight	90 kg (200 lb)
Length	1,000 mm (39.4 in)
Width	580 mm (22.8 in)
Folded height	750 mm (29.5 in)
Max. camera reach	1,770 mm (69.7 in)
Min. operating temperature	−20 °C (−4.0 °F)
Max. operating temperature	60 °C (140.0 °F)
Connectivity	4G / LTE or WiFi
