= Mira Mezini =

German computer scientist

- Born: 18 November 1966 (age 59)
- Education: University of Siegen
- Scientific career
- Fields: Artificial intelligence, programming languages, software analysis
- Workplaces: Technische Universität Darmstadt

Mira Mezini (born 18 November 1966 in Albania) is a computer scientist and Professor of Computer Science based in Germany. She heads the Software Engineering group at the Department of Computer Science of the Technische Universität Darmstadt. Mira Mezini is married and has one daughter.

She is known for her research on programming languages, intelligent software development environments, modular software architectures, and software security.

== Life and career ==
Mezini was born in Albania. From 1984, she studied computer science at the University of Tirana, obtaining her diploma in computer science in 1989. She then worked as a research and teaching assistant at the university. From 1992 until her doctorate in 1997, she was a research associate at the University of Siegen. The title of her PhD thesis was "Variational Object-Oriented Programming Beyond Classes and Inheritance". From 1997 she was assistant professor for two years at Northeastern University in Boston (USA). In 2000, she joined TU Darmstadt, where she held a professorship in Computer Science. From 2013 to 2016, she was a visiting professor at Lancaster University (UK) and in 2022 at the University of Lugano (Switzerland).

Mira Mezini has held various university leadership positions. She was Dean of the Department of Computer Science from 2013 to 2014, before becoming Vice President for Knowledge and Technology Transfer at TU Darmstadt from 2014 to 2016. She then served as Vice President for Research and Innovation until 2019. Since 2019, she has represented TU Darmstadt on the executive board of the National Research Center for Applied Cybersecurity ATHENE. She is also a founding co-director of hessian.AI, the Hessian Center for Artificial Intelligence. In addition, Mezini is co-spokesperson for the Cluster of Excellence “Reasonable Artificial Intelligence” (RAI), which will start in 2026.

== Awards, honours, and outstanding positions in the research community ==
In 1984, Mezini received the Gold Medal of Ministry of Education, Sports and Youth. In 2005 and 2006, she received the IBM Eclipse Innovation Award. In 2012, Mezini received an ERC Advanced Grant of 2.3 million euros, the European Union's highest endowed grant. In 2013, she received an honorary doctorate from the University of Tirana. In 2016, she became member of the German Academy of Science and Engineering (acatech). In 2019, she received an ERC Proof of Concept-Grant for the project "Programming Abstractions for Applications in Cloud Environments (PACE)".

She is a member of various committees, including the Computer Science Review Board of the German Research Foundation DFG, the international START/Wittgenstein Jury of the Austrian Science Fund and the Executive Committee of SIGPLAN - Special Interest Group for Programming Languages - of the Association for Computing Machinery (ACM). In addition, Mezini is one of the representatives in the Quadriga to the National Pact for Cybersecurity and in 2020 was appointed to the ERC Scientific Council Search Committee by the European Commissioner for Innovation, Research, Culture, Education and Youth.

She was named as an ACM Fellow, in the 2024 class of fellows, "for contributions to programming languages and software analysis with applications in distributed systems, cybersecurity, and artificial intelligence and for contributions to learning-based code completion". In 2024, she received the ACM SIGSOFT Impact Paper Award.

In 2024, she was elected into the Academia Europaea.

Since 2025, she has been a member of the Information Sciences Section of the German National Academy of Sciences Leopoldina.

In 2025, she received the Dahl–Nygaard Prize for her contributions to software development.

Mira Mezini is the co-spokesperson of the Cluster of Excellence "Reasonable Artificial Intelligence", RAI (2026-32).

She is also a Principal Investigator at the ATHENE National Research Centre for Applied Cybersecurity.
