= Bernhard Nebel =

German artificial intelligence researcher

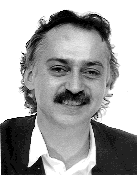
- Born: 6 May 1956 (age 70)
- Education: Saarland University
- Scientific career
- Fields: Artificial Intelligence
- Workplaces: Albert-Ludwigs-Universität Freiburg
- Doctoral advisor: Wolfgang Wahlster

Bernhard Nebel (born 6 May 1956) is a German artificial intelligence scientist. He is a full professor at the Albert-Ludwigs-Universität Freiburg where he holds the chair for foundations of artificial intelligence.

Bernhard Nebel received his Diploma degree from the University of Hamburg in 1980 and his Doctorate from the Saarland University in 1989. His thesis advisor was Wolfgang Wahlster.

Between 1982 and 1993 he worked on different AI projects at the University of Hamburg, Technische Universität Berlin, ISI/USC, IBM Germany, and the German Research Center for AI (DFKI). From 1993 to 1996 he held an associate professor position (C3) at the University of Ulm. Since 1996 he is full professor at Albert-Ludwigs-Universität Freiburg.

Among other professional services, he served as the Program Co-chair for the 3rd International Conference on Principles of Knowledge Representation and Reasoning (KR'92), as the Program Co-chair for the 18th German Annual Conference on AI (KI'94), as the General Chair of the 21st German Annual Conference on Artificial Intelligence (KI'97), and as the Program Chair for the 17th International Joint Conference on Artificial Intelligence (IJCAI'01). In 2001, Bernhard Nebel was elected as an ECCAI fellow.

Throughout his entire career, Bernhard Nebel has made substantial contributions to the foundations of Artificial Intelligence, to automated planning and scheduling, and to the RoboCup initiative. Bernhard Nebel is (co-)author and (co-)editor of 9 books and proceedings, as well as author and co-author of more than 100 refereed papers in scientific journals, books, and conference proceedings. His CS Freiburg RoboCup team became world champion in the RoboCup mid-size league in 1998, 2000, and 2001. Bernhard Nebel and his group have also developed the first autonomous table football system. Bernhard Nebel is a fellow of the European Coordinating Committee for Artificial Intelligence. In 2009, he was elected to be a member of the German Academy of Sciences Leopoldina. In 2010, he became a fellow of the Association for the Advancement of Artificial Intelligence.
