= Oskar von Stryk =

German computer scientist

Oskar von Stryk is professor of simulation, system optimization and robotics at the department of computer science of the Technische Universität Darmstadt. He is known for his research on robotics.

== Life ==
From 1984 to 1989 Stryk studied mathematics and computer science at the Technical University of Munich. In 1994, he received his doctorate in mathematics and then habilitated at the university. He was then postdoctoral researcher at the Technical University of Munich. Since 2000 he is professor of simulation, system optimization and robotics at the department of computer science of the Technische Universität Darmstadt. From April 2011 to March 2013 he was dean of the department. He was visiting professor and lecturer at the University of California, San Diego, and the Universidade Estadual de Campinas, Brazil. Stryk is vice president of Robocup. Since 2018 he has been building the German Rescue Robotics Centre.

== Roboter ==
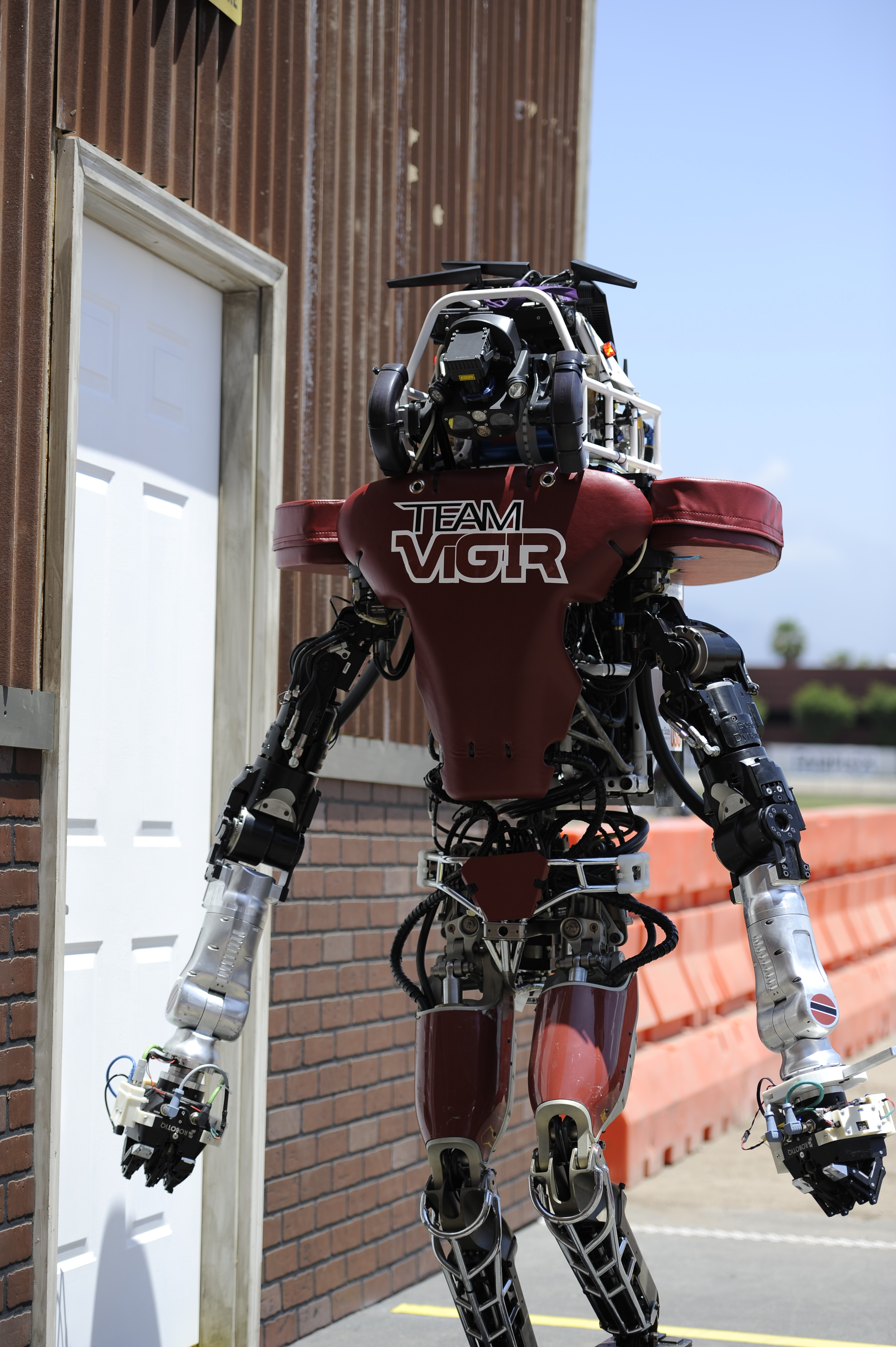
Roboter Florian at the DARPA Robotics Challenge 2015

He competed in two different teams Hector and ViGIR in the final of the DARPA Robotics Challenge. Team Hector competed with the robot Johnny 05 and ViGIR with Florian.

The search and rescue robot Hector (Heterogeneous Cooperating Team Of Robots) of the Technische Universität Darmstadt competed in 2014 in Rescue Robot League of RoboCup, the oldest and world's largest competition for intelligent robots in various application scenarios, and took first place there. The robot Hector took 1st place in the category Best in Class Autonomy, the most intelligent robot, in the Rescue Robot League in the years from 2012 to 2015 and 2018 to 2019.

In 2017, the Argonaut robot, developed by a team led by Stryk, won the ARGOS Challenge for intelligent inspection robots on oil and gas platforms, which the company Total S.A. had launched. The prize was half a million euros. Argonaut is a variant of Taurob tracker and the first fully autonomous, mobile inspection robot for oil and gas plants.

In 2018, Hector competed at the World Robot Summit in Tokyo in the category Plant Disaster Prevention Challenge and won 1st place.

== Publications ==
- von Stryk, O. & Bulirsch, R. Ann Oper Res (1992) 37: 357. DOI: 10.1007/BF02071065
- von Stryk O. (1993) Numerical Solution of Optimal Control Problems by Direct Collocation. In: Bulirsch R., Miele A., Stoer J., Well K. (eds) Optimal Control. ISNM International Series of Numerical Mathematics, vol 111. Birkhäuser Basel. ISBN 978-3-0348-7541-7, 978-3-0348-7539-4
- S. Kohlbrecher, O. von Stryk, J. Meyer and U. Klingauf, "A flexible and scalable SLAM system with full 3D motion estimation," 2011 IEEE International Symposium on Safety, Security, and Rescue Robotics, Kyoto, 2011, pp. 155–160. DOI: 10.1109/SSRR.2011.6106777
