= Taurob =

Engineering and robotics design company

- Company type: GmbH
- Industry: Robotics
- Founded: 2010; 16 years ago
- Founder: Lukas Silberbauer, Matthias Biegl
- Headquarters: Vienna, Austria
- Area served: Global
- Number of employees: ~50 (2024)
- Website: taurob.com

Taurob GmbH is an Austrian robotics company best known for its ATEX certified Taurob Inspector robot and for winning Total Energies' ARGOS Challenge (together with TU Darmstadt) in 2017. Since 2019, Taurob is part of Dietsmann Group.

== History ==
Founded in 2010 by Lukas Silberbauer and Matthias Biegl with the aim of developing robots for fire fighters the company has since expanded to other domains such as police, civil-defence, military and the oil and gas industry.

In 2012 Taurob introduced the world's first ATEX certified robot with the Taurob Tracker.

Forming a collaborative team named ARGONAUTS with TU Darmstadt, Taurob participated in Total Energies' ARGOS (Autonomous Robots for Oil and Gas Sites) challenge between 2014 and 2017. The ARGONAUTS team was ultimately victorious, making the final shortlist of 5 teams out of 31 international entries. This victory resulted in the robot being chosen to start operating on Total Energies industrial sites by 2020.

Between 2018 and 2020 Taurob was part of the OGRIP (Offshore Ground Robotics Industrial Pilot) project, funded by Total Energies and the Oil and Gas Technology Center (OGTC) which formed the foundation of the Taurob Inspector robot - a refinement and development of the platform that won the ARGOS challenge and the existing Taurob Tracker robot.

In August 2020 the Taurob Inspector performed the world's first offshore deployment of an ATEX certified robot with its week-long mission on a platform in Total Energies' K5 gas field 110 km off the coast of the Netherlands. The mission focused on robotically surveying the platform for corrosion and on teleoperation from an on-shore control room.

Two Taurob Inspectors were handed over to TOTAL in November 2020 for a year-long deployment at the Shetland Gas Plant. The robots will be focused on conducting autonomous inspection rounds of an MEG (gas dehydration) unit, with tasks such as valve reading, corrosion identification and frequency monitoring of valves and other components.

The company is currently designing the first OWCR (Offshore Work Class Robot) with a heavy duty arm as part of a joint industry project with Total Energies, Equinor and SAFT. This robot will be ATEX and IECEx certified and allow a much higher degree of modularity. The first trials were performed in Q3 2023 in Lacq, France.
