= Paul Busch (physicist) =

German-born mathematical physicist (1955–2018)

- Born: 15 February 1955; Refrath, Bergisch Gladbach, Germany
- Died: 9 June 2018 (aged 63); York, England
- Education: University of Cologne
- Known for: Quantum uncertainty; Quantum measurement
- Scientific career
- Fields: Physics, Mathematics
- Workplaces: University of York, University of Hull
- Doctoral advisor: Peter Mittelstaedt
- Website: paulbusch.wixsite.com/research-page www.york.ac.uk/maths/staff/paul-busch/

Paul Busch (15 February 1955 – 9 June 2018) was a German-born mathematical physicist, known for his work in quantum mechanics. He made pioneering contributions to quantum measurement theory, being an advocate of the use of POVMs, and to the uncertainty principle in quantum mechanics, where he developed a mathematical formulation of a measurement-disturbance relation.

He was a professor of mathematics at the University of Hull and the University of York. He published over 100 scientific articles and co-authored three books: The Quantum Theory of Measurement, Operational Quantum Physics and Quantum Measurement.

== Early life and education ==
Busch was born in Refrath, a district of Bergisch Gladbach, Germany in February 1955. He studied at the University of Cologne, obtaining a Diploma in Physics in 1979 and a Ph.D. in 1982 under the supervision of Peter Mittelstaedt. The title of his Ph.D. thesis was Indeterminacy relations and simultaneous measurements in quantum theory. He followed his PhD with a Habilitation in Mathematical Physics from the University of Cologne, for a thesis entitled Physical aspects of a generalised observable concept in quantum theory.

== Career ==
Busch held positions at Florida Atlantic University (1986), the Max Planck Institute (Göttingen) (1987–88), and the University of Heidelberg (1994). In 1995, he moved to the University of Hull, where he was successively lecturer, reader and professor of mathematical physics; he was head of the department of mathematics from 2001 to 2005. He joined the University of York as professor of mathematics in 2005, where he remained until his death. He was additionally an adjunct professor of theoretical physics at the University of Turku in Finland (from 1991), and also held visiting professorships at the Lyman Laboratory of Physics, Harvard University (1994–95) and the Perimeter Institute for Theoretical Physics in Waterloo, Ontario (2005–07).

He died in June 2018 after a short illness.

== Honours ==
Busch was elected a Fellow of the Institute of Physics in 2014 and a full member of L'Académie Internationale de Philosophie des Sciences in 2016. He was President of the International Quantum Structures Association (2016 until his death).
