= Johannes Buchmann =

German mathematician (born 1953)

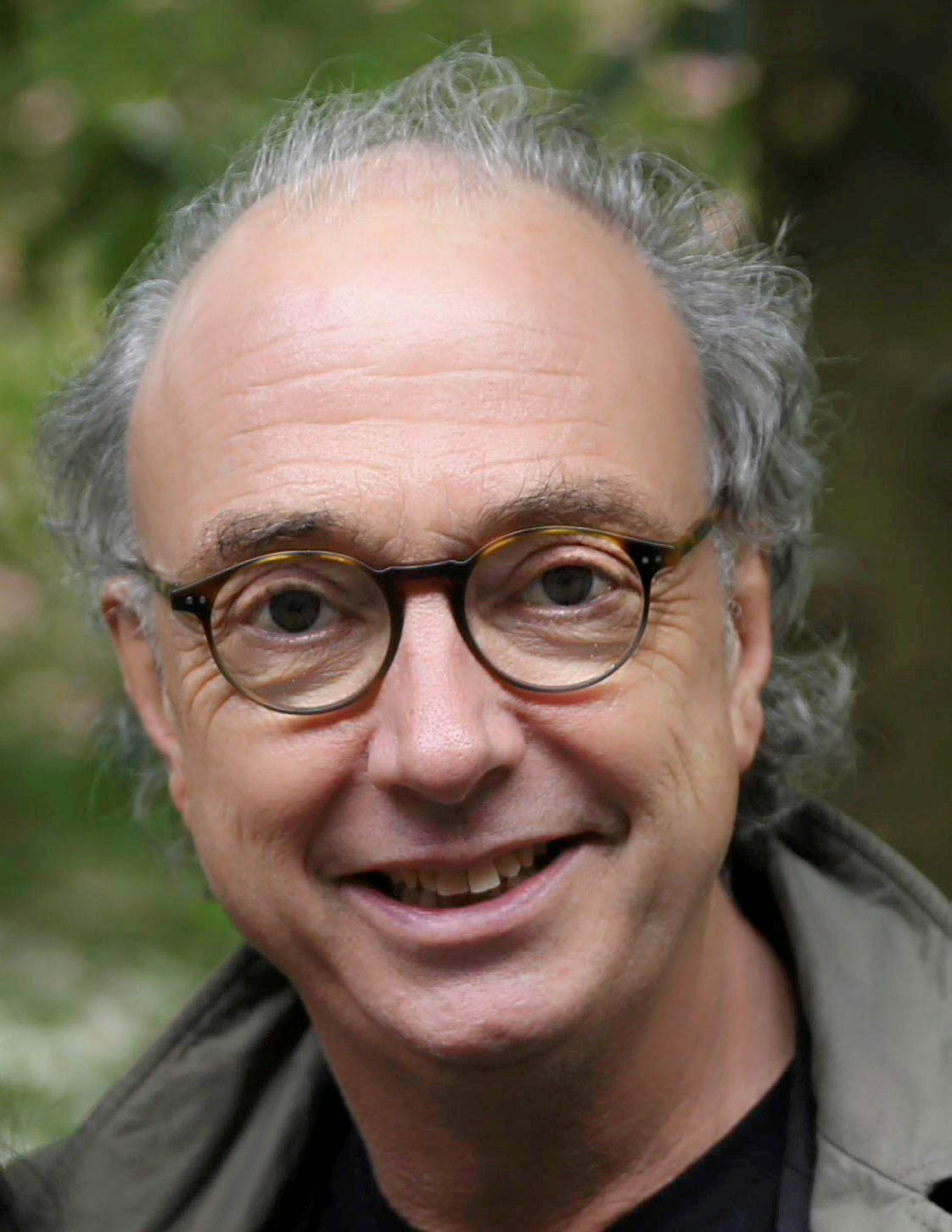
Johannes Buchmann in 2016

Johannes Alfred Buchmann (born November 20, 1953, in Cologne) is a German computer scientist, mathematician and professor emeritus at the department of computer science of the Technische Universität Darmstadt.

He is known for his research in algorithmic number theory, algebra, post-quantum cryptography and IT security. In 1993, he received the Gottfried Wilhelm Leibniz Prize together with Claus Peter Schnorr for his work in algorithmic number theory and cryptography. Buchmann also developed the stateful hash-based signature scheme XMSS, the first future-proof secure and practical signature scheme with minimal security requirements, which was declared the first international standard for post-quantum signature schemes in 2018. In addition, he further developed IT security research in Germany. His efforts led to the creation of ATHENE, the largest research center for IT security in Europe. For this he received the Konrad Zuse Medal for Services to Computer Science of the Gesellschaft für Informatik (GI) in 2017.

== Life ==
Johannes Buchmann studied mathematics, physics, pedagogy and philosophy at the University of Cologne from 1974 to 1979 after graduating from high school in 1972 and completing his military service. After passing the first state examination for teaching at grammar schools in 1979, he taught mathematics at a Cologne secondary school from 1980 to 1983 while at the same time working as a research assistant at the university. In 1982 he did his doctorate at the university under the supervision of Hans-Joachim Stender. In 1984 he passed the second state examination. In 1985/86 he was with Hans Zassenhaus at Ohio State University on a scholarship from the Alexander von Humboldt Foundation. From 1986 to 1988 he was research assistant of Michael Pohst at the University of Düsseldorf, where he habilitated in 1988. Then he worked as professor of computer science at Saarland University. In 1996, he then was professor of computer science and mathematics at the Technische Universität Darmstadt. He retired in 2019.

From 2001 to 2007, he was vice president for Research at the Technische Universität Darmstadt. Since 2004, he has been chairman of the Board of the Competence Center for Applied Security (CAST), the largest network for cyber security in German-speaking countries. From 2011 to 2013, Buchmann headed the project Internet Privacy - A Culture of Privacy and Trust on the Internet of the German Academy of Science and Engineering. He was founding director of the Center for Advanced Security Research Darmstadt (CASED) and held this position from 2008 to 2011. From 2011 to 2016, he was a member of the board of directors of the European Center for Security and Privacy by Design (EC SPRIDE). From 2016 to 2018, Buchmann was Vice Director of the Center for Research in Security and Privacy (CRISP), the largest research institute for IT security in Europe. From 2014 to 2019, he was spokesman of the Collaborative Research Center CROSSING and from 2015 to 2019 spokesman of the profile area CYSEC of TU Darmstadt. He gave his farewell lecture on October 24, 2019.

From 2017 to 2018, Johannes Buchmann trained as an MBSR (Mindfulness-Based Stress Reduction) teacher at the Institute for Mindfulness. Since then he has been working as a certified MBSR teacher.

Buchmann is married and has two sons.

== Work ==
Buchmann's achievements include scientific essays on algorithms in algebraic number theory, the construction of new cryptographic methods and the use of cryptographic methods in practice. Due to his collaboration with Kálmán Győry he has the Erdős number 2. Buchmann dealt with algorithms in algebraic number theory and their application in cryptography. In 1988, he proposed with Hugh C. Williams a cryptographic system based on the discrete logarithmic problem in the ideal class group of imaginary-square number fields (which, according to Carl Friedrich Gauss, is related to the theory of binary-square forms), which triggered further developments in cryptography with number fields.

Since 1996, Buchmann has been working intensively on the topic of public key infrastructures, for which he published the book Introduction to Public Key Infrastructures together with Evangelos Karatsiolis and Alexander Wiesmaier in 2013. Buchmann has been working on post-quantum cryptography since 2003 and published a book of the same name together with Daniel J. Bernstein and Erik Dahmen in 2009. Buchmann is also the author of the textbook Introduction to Cryptography, which has been translated into seven languages.

In Saarbrücken, the research work of Buchmann concentrated on the theoretical cryptography and cryptanalysis of number theory-based public-key methods like RSA. During his time in Saarbrücken, Buchmann also founded the German Research Foundations first graduate school for computer science and was able to establish research in cryptography and IT security as an integral part of the university.

In 2018, the stateful hash-based signature scheme XMSS developed by a team of researchers under the direction of Buchmann became the first international standard for post-quantum signature schemes. XMSS is the first future-proof secure and practical signature scheme with minimal security requirements. The work began in 2003.

== Awards ==
- 1993 Gottfried Wilhelm Leibniz Prize (together with Claus-Peter Schnorr), for his work in algorithmic number theory and cryptography
- 2002 Member of the Academy of Sciences and Literature Mainz
- 2003 Innovation Award of the State of Hesse
- 2006 Member of the Berlin-Brandenburg Academy of Sciences and Humanities
- 2006 Honorary Doctorate of the University of Debrecen, Hungary
- 2008 Member of the German Academy of Science and Engineering
- 2011 Member of the German Academy of Natural Scientists Leopoldina
- 2017 Konrad-Zuse-Medal for Services to Computer Science of the Gesellschaft für Informatik (GI)

== Publications ==
- Buchmann, Johannes (2013). Introduction to public key infrastructures. Heidelberg: Springer. ISBN 978-3-642-40656-0. OCLC 867558369.
- Hildebrandt, Mireille (2013). Digital enlightenment yearbook 2013 : the value of personal data. Amsterdam: IOS Press. ISBN 978-1-61499-294-3. OCLC 862074918.
- Buchmann, Johannes (2012). Internet privacy : eine multidisziplinäre Bestandsaufnahme = a multidisciplinary analysis. Berlin: Acatech. ISBN 978-3-642-31942-6. OCLC 834575315.
- Bernstein, Daniel (2009). Post-quantum cryptography (in German). Berlin: Springer. ISBN 978-3-540-88701-0. OCLC 318545517.
- Buchmann, Johannes; Dahmen, Erik; Hülsing, Andreas (2011). "XMSS - A Practical Forward Secure Signature Scheme Based on Minimal Security Assumptions". Post-Quantum Cryptography. Lecture Notes in Computer Science. Vol. 7071. Berlin, Heidelberg: Springer Berlin Heidelberg. pp. 117–129. doi:10.1007/978-3-642-25405-5_8. ISBN 978-3-642-25404-8. ISSN 0302-9743.
