= Center for Advanced Security Research Darmstadt =

Center for IT security research and development

Coordinates: 49°52′21″N 8°38′07″E

Center for Advanced Security Research Darmstadt (CASED)
- Established: July 2008
- Research type: Interdisciplinary
- Budget: LOEWE funding
- Field of research: basic and application-oriented
- Directors: Michael Waidner; Johannes Buchmann
- Faculty: IT-Security
- Staff: approx. 170
- Students: 28
- Location: Mornewegstr. 32, Darmstadt, Germany
- Operating agency: TU Darmstadt; Fraunhofer SIT; Darmstadt University of Applied Sciences

The Center for Advanced Security Research Darmstadt (CASED) was a center for IT security research and development with an interdisciplinary and cross-organizational approach. It was founded in July 2008 by TU Darmstadt, the Fraunhofer Institute for Secure Information Technology (SIT) and the Darmstadt University of Applied Sciences. CASED promoted and coordinated cooperation between the three institutions.

CASED was part of LOEWE. LOEWE is an initiative of the government of Hesse (Ministry of Higher Education, Research and the Arts) for supporting the development of scientific and economic excellence in Hesse on a long-term basis. The government of Hesse provided funding for the infrastructure of CASED as well as for various projects of the three institutions involved.

In those funded projects, computer scientists, engineers, physicians, legal experts and economists of the three cluster partners did basic and application-oriented research.

Research and development of new security solutions for important growing areas of IT technology, such as embedded systems and service-oriented architecture, was the ultimate goal of the center. Subsequently, they hoped to prevent substantial economic damage caused by economic espionage, manipulation, and product counterfeiting. Another aim was to make new techniques and online services run smoothly and safely for both providers and users.

CASED merged with the European Center for Security and Privacy by Design (EC SPRIDE) into the Center for Research in Security and Privacy (CRISP).

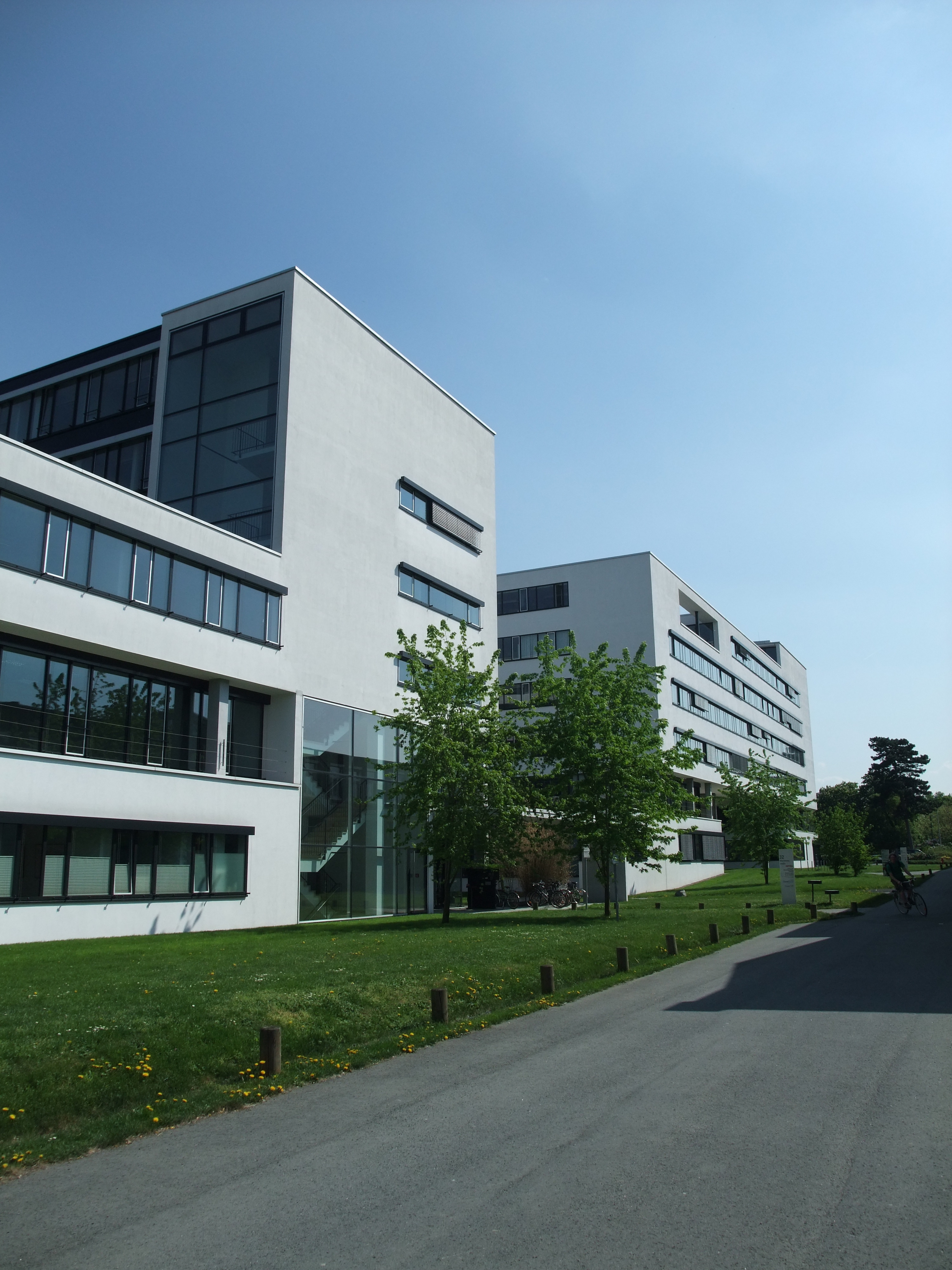
The Center for Advanced Security Research Darmstadt

== Research areas ==
- Secure Data: Basic research and development of procedures for digital data security in a heterogeneous, dynamic and decentralized world with computers being present everywhere.
- Secure Things: Basic research and development of procedures for protection of embedded systems, which often only have small resources and few means of communication.
- Secure Services: Basic research and development of procedures for durable improvement of security and reliability of on-demand services.
- Smart Civil Security: Basic research and development of procedures for security and reliability of new human-computer interaction as well as software- and communication concepts.
- The graduate school offers a structured program for CASED PhD students.

== Research topics ==
- Cryptography including Quantum Cryptography, Public-Key- and other Secure Infrastructures
- Formal Verification
- Long-time Archiving
- Digital Watermarking, Digital Rights Management and Enterprise Rights Management
- Data Privacy and Copyright
- IT Forensics
- Trusted Computing
- Security of Embedded systems
- Security of RFIDs and Chipcards
- Self-healing and Self-defence
- Security in Wireless and Sensor-networks
- Secure Applications for Mobile devices
- Recognition of Malware
- Protection against Product piracy
- Trusted Computing
- Side Channel Analysis and Hardening
- Security-Policies
- Software Security
- Secure Operating systems and Middleware
- Identity/Access-Management
- Models of Trust and Reputation
- E-Voting, eHealth, eCommerce, eGovernment
- Multimedia Security
- Risk Management
- Compliance recognition of Malware Security testing, Security metrics, Security in Service-orientated Architectures and Clouds
- Secure Webapplications, Usability of Secure products
- Legally and economically Aspects
- Security critical Infrastructures and Emergency Management
- Biometry, Recognition of Persons and Tracking Security Awareness

== Involved scientists ==
Gernot Alber, Reiner Anderl, Harald Baier, Eric Bodden, Alejandro Buchmann, Johannes Buchmann, Stanislav Bulygin, Christoph Busch, Peter Buxmann, Marc Fischlin, Iryna Gurevych, Matthias Hollick, Sorin A. Huss, Stefan Katzenbeisser, Andreas Koch, Heiko Mantel, Mark Manulis, Mira Mezini, Max Mühlhäuser, Alexander Rossnagel, Ahmad-Reza Sadeghi, Werner Schindler, Andy Schürr, Martin Steinebach, Thorsten Strufe, Neeraj Suri, Melanie Volkamer, Michael Waidner, Thomas Walther, Leonardo Martucci
