= N. Asokan =

Professor of Computer Science at University of Waterloo

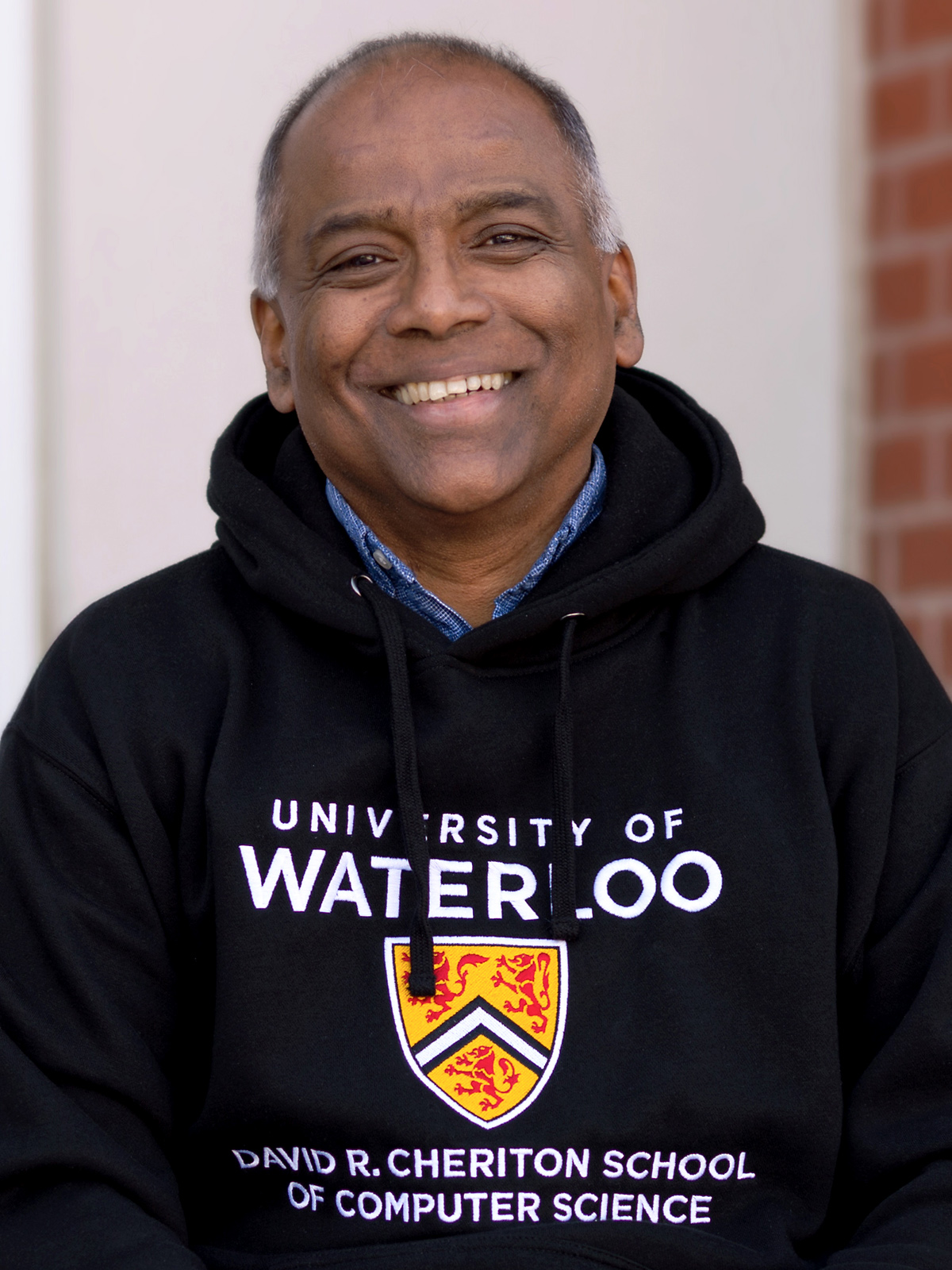
- Occupation: Professor

Academic background
- Education: University of Waterloo; Syracuse University; Indian Institute of Technology Kharagpur
- Thesis: Fairness in Electronic Commerce (1998)
- Doctoral advisor: Jay Black; Michael Waidner

Academic work
- Discipline: Computer Science
- Sub-discipline: Computer Security
- Institutions: University of Waterloo; Aalto University; University of Helsinki; Nokia Research Center
- Website: asokan.org/asokan

Nadarajah Asokan is a professor of computer science who held the David R. Cheriton Chair in Software Systems from September 2019 to December 2025 at the University of Waterloo's David R. Cheriton School of Computer Science. In 2026, he was named a university professor, the University of Waterloo’s most prestigious institutional recognition, awarded for exceptional scholarly achievement and international pre-eminence. He served as Executive Director of Waterloo’s Cybersecurity and Privacy Institute from May 2021 to November 2025. He was also an adjunct professor in the Department of Computer Science at Aalto University.

== Education and career ==
Asokan received a bachelor of technology (BTech) honours in computer science and engineering from the Indian Institute of Technology Kharagpur in 1988, a Master of Science (MS) in computer and information science from Syracuse University in 1989, and a PhD in computer science from the University of Waterloo in 1998. His doctoral thesis was on the topic of Fairness in Electronic Commerce.

From 1999 to 2012 he was employed at Nokia Research Center (NRC) in Helsinki, Finland, where he worked on several notable projects, including contributions to the design of the numeric comparison protocol as part of the Bluetooth Secure Simple Pairing update, as well as what would become the Generic Bootstrapping Architecture.

From September 2012 until December 2017 he was a professor of computer science at the University of Helsinki (part-time from August 2013 onwards). In 2013 he became a tenured (full) professor of computer science at Aalto University, where he co-led the Secure Systems Group (SSG) and established the Helsinki-Aalto Center for Information Security (HAIC), since renamed to the Helsinki-Aalto Institute for Cybersecurity.

At Aalto University he led research projects funded by the Academy of Finland, Business Finland, and various companies. He was a principal investigator (PI) of the Intel Research Institute for Collaborative Resilient and Autonomous Systems (CARS). His term as adjunct professor at Aalto University ended in August 2024.

In 2019 he joined the David R. Cheriton School of Computer Science at the University of Waterloo as a (full) professor and a David R. Cheriton Chair in Software Systems.

Asokan is the inventor of over 50 granted patents.

== Awards and recognition ==
- 2026: University Professor, a prestigious honour conferred by the University of Waterloo to recognize exceptional scholarly achievement and international pre-eminence
- 2023: Fellow of the Royal Society of Canada noting his contributions as a leader in systems security, especially in the context of security protocols and security of mobile devices
- 2018: Fellow of the Association for Computing Machinery for contributions to systems security and privacy, especially of mobile systems
- 2018: Association for Computing Machinery Special Interest Group on Security, Audit and Control (SIGSAC) Outstanding Innovation Award for pioneering research on fair-exchange protocols, trusted device pairing and mobile trusted execution environments that has had widespread impact and led to large-scale deployment
- 2017: Fellow of the Institute of Electrical and Electronics Engineers for contributions to system security and privacy
- 2015: ACM Distinguished Member
- 2013: Google Faculty Research Award in the field of security

== Other contributions ==
Asokan was part of the team that translated the book Operaatio Elop (Operation Elop) from Finnish into English.
