= Athene (research center) =

Research institute in Darmstadt, Germany

Coordinates: 49.8713934°N 8.636106°E

ATHENE
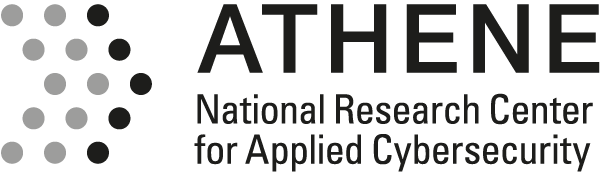
- Established: 2015
- Field of research: IT security, cryptography
- Directors: Michael Waidner
- Staff: Over 650
- Location: Rheinstraße 75, 64295 Darmstadt, Germany, Darmstadt, Hesse, Germany
- Website: www.athene-center.de

ATHENE, formerly Center for Research in Security and Privacy (CRISP), is the national research center for IT security and privacy in Germany and the largest research center for IT security in Europe. The research center is located in Darmstadt and deals with key issues of IT security in the digitization of government, business and society.

ATHENE established a new research area in IT security research, the IT security of large systems, which is the focus of its research. Up to now, isolated aspects such as individual protocols or encryption methods have mostly been investigated. Research into the IT security of large systems should lead to a measurable increase in IT security. The research spectrum ranges from basic research to application.

Director of ATHENE is Michael Waidner.

== Organisation ==
ATHENE is an institution of the Fraunhofer Society, involving the Fraunhofer Institute for Secure Information Technology (Fraunhofer SIT) and the Fraunhofer Institute for Computer Graphics Research (Fraunhofer IGD), as well as the Technische Universität Darmstadt (TU Darmstadt), Goethe University Frankfurt am Main and Darmstadt University of Applied Sciences.

It is one of three centres of excellence for IT security funded by the Federal Ministry of Research, Technology and Space (BMFTR), and serves as the National Research Centre for Applied Cybersecurity.

ATHENE is funded by the Federal Ministry of Research, Technology and Space (BMFTR) and the Hessian Ministry of Higher Education, Research and the Arts (HMWK).

=== Board ===
The Athene Board comprises representatives from the following institutions:

- Fraunhofer SIT: Michael Waidner (Chair)
- Fraunhofer IGD: Matthias Unbescheiden
- Technical University of Darmstadt: Mira Mezini
- Goethe University Frankfurt: Haya Schulmann
- Darmstadt University of Applied Sciences: Andreas Heinemann

== History ==
ATHENEs history dates back to 1961, when the German Data Center (German: Deutsches Rechenzentrum (DRZ)) was founded in Darmstadt. At that time, the German Data Center was equipped with one of the most powerful mainframe computers in Germany and thus became the first mainframe computer center in Germany that could be used for research purposes by universities and scientific institutions. After the ARPANET succeeded in connecting computers with each other, communication between the machines became the focus of research at the DRZ. The DRZ had merged in 1973 with other research institutions in this field to form the Society for Mathematics and Data Processing (German: Gesellschaft für Mathematik und Datenverarbeitung (GMD)). As a result, resources were pooled and working groups networked and the society established the Institute for Remote Data Processing, which was renamed the Institute for Telecooperation Technology in 1992. Under the leadership of Heinz Thielmann, the institute became more and more involved with IT security issues and with the rise of the Internet, IT security became increasingly important, so that in 1998 it was renamed the Institute for Secure Telecooperation. In 2001, GMD merged with the Fraunhofer Society into the Fraunhofer Institute for Secure Information Technology (Fraunhofer SIT).

In 1975, José Luis Encarnação established the Interactive Graphics Systems (GRIS) research group within the Institute for Information Management and Interactive Systems of the Department of Computer Science of the Technische Hochschule Darmstadt (TH Darmstadt), now called Technische Universität Darmstadt. GRIS later collaborated with the Center for Computer Graphics in 1984. A working group, which emerged from this collaboration, was taken up by the Fraunhofer Society and in 1987 the Fraunhofer Institute for Computer Graphics Research (Fraunhofer IGD) was established. Founding Director of the Fraunhofer IGD was José Luis Encarnação.

In 1996, Johannes Buchmann was appointed Professor of Theoretical Computer Science at the Department of Computer Science of TH Darmstadt. His appointment is regarded as the birth of IT security at TH Darmstadt. In 2001, Claudia Eckert, who also headed Fraunhofer SIT from 2001 to 2011, was appointed Professor of Information Security at TU Darmstadt.

In 1999, Darmstadt's universities and research institutions founded the Competence Center for Applied Security (CAST), the largest network for cyber security in German-speaking countries.

In 2002, the Darmstadt Center for IT-Security (German: Darmstädter Zentrum für IT-Sicherheit (DZI)) was founded, which in 2008 became the Center for Advanced Security Research Darmstadt (CASED). Founding Director of CASED was Buchmann. In 2010, Michael Waidner became Director of Fraunhofer SIT. In response to Buchmann and Waidners efforts, the European Center for Security and Privacy by Design (EC SPRIDE) was founded in 2011. CASED and EC SPRIDE were part of LOEWE, the research excellence programm of the state Hesse. Buchmann and Waidner developed the centers into the largest research institutions for IT security in Europe. In 2015, CASED and EC SPRIDE merged into Center for Research in Security and Privacy (CRISP).

In 2012, Intel founded the Intel Collaborative Research Institute for Secure Computing at the Technische Universität Darmstadt. It was the first Intel collaborative research center for IT security outside of the United States. In 2014, the German Research Foundation (DFG) also established the Collaborative Research Centre Cryptography–Based Security Solutions (CROSSING), which deals with cryptography-based security solutions. In 2016, the Federal Ministry of Finance decided to make the region around Darmstadt the pre-eminent hub for the digital transformation of the economy. The Federal Ministry of Finance set up the "Digital Hub Cybersecurity" and "Digital Hub FinTech" centres in the region to help start-ups in Germany commercialise, scale and internationalise their solutions and companies.

Researchers at ATHENE played a major role in establishing the field of post quantum cryptography internationally. In 2018, the stateful hash-based signature scheme XMSS developed by a team of researchers under the direction of Buchmann became the first international standard for post-quantum signature schemes. XMSS is the first future-proof secure and practical signature scheme with minimal security requirements. The work began in 2003.

Since 1 January 2019, CRISP has been the national research centre for IT security in Germany. CRISP was later renamed ATHENE.

In 2022, Goethe University Frankfurt joined ATHENE.
