= Michael Waidner =

German mathematician

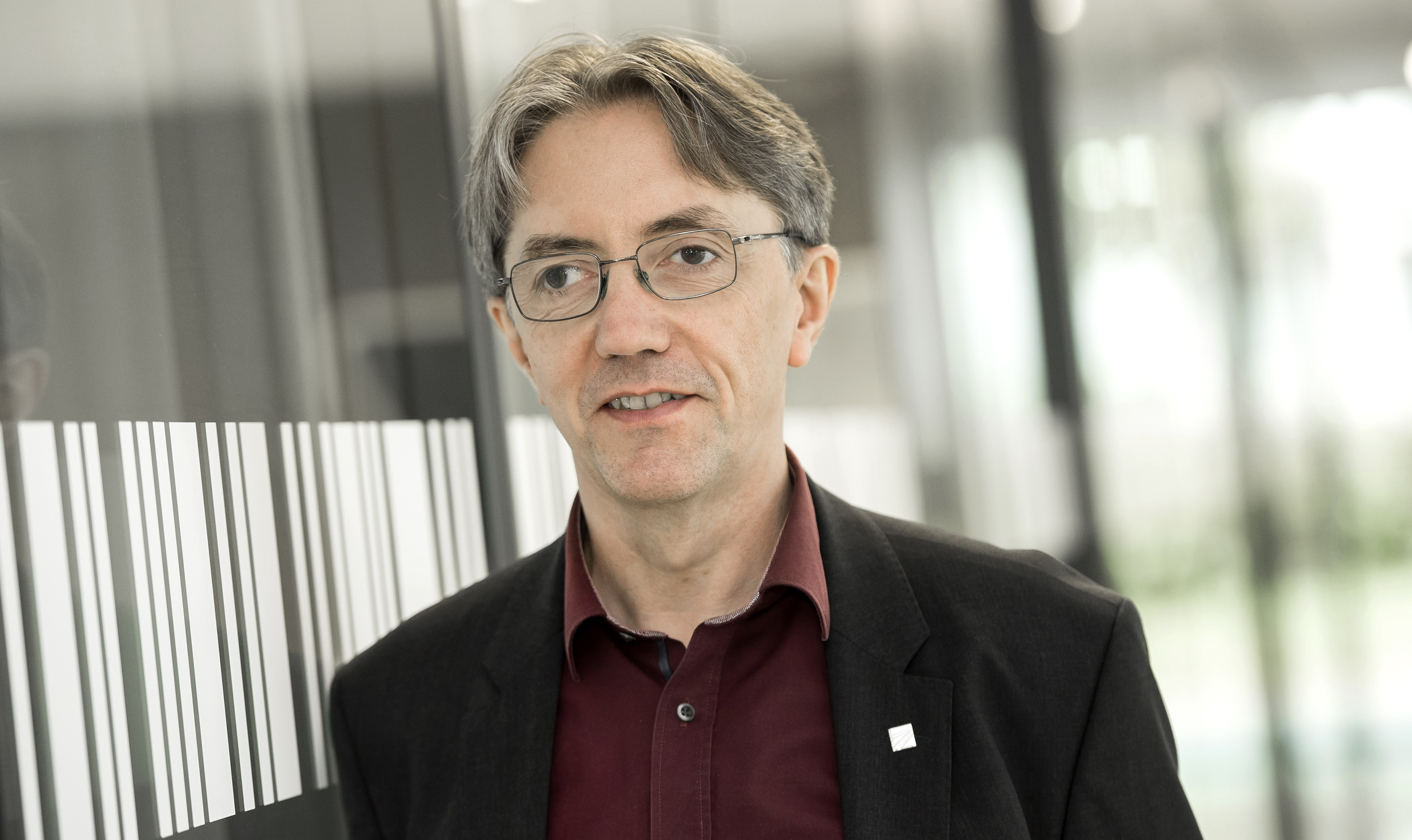
- Education: University of Karlsruhe
- Awards: ACM Distinguished Member
- Scientific career
- Fields: IT security, privacy, cryptography, dependability
- Workplaces: Technische Universität Darmstadt, Fraunhofer Institute for Secure Information Technology, ATHENE
- Thesis: Byzantine distribution without cryptographic assumptions despite any number of errors
- Notable students: Nadarajah Asokan

Michael Waidner (born on December 20, 1961, in Mühlacker) is a German computer scientist. He is director of the Fraunhofer Institute for Secure Information Technology and ATHENE, the largest research institute for IT security in Europe. He is also professor of security in information technology at the department of computer science of the Technische Universität Darmstadt.

He is known for his work in IT security, privacy, cryptography and dependability.

== Life ==
Waidner studied computer science at the University of Karlsruhe and received his doctorate in computer science in 1991. The title of his dissertation was "Byzantine distribution without cryptographic assumptions despite any number of errors". From 1994 to 2006, he headed research in IT security and data protection at IBM Research - Zurich and was one of the initiators of the Zurich Information Security Center at ETH Zurich. He then moved to IBM in New York, where he was IBM Chief Technology Officer for Security and chairman of the IBM Security Architecture Board until September 2010.

Since 2010, Waidner is professor at the department of computer science of the Technische Universität Darmstadt and director of the Fraunhofer Institute for Secure Information Technology in Darmstadt. Waidner is also director of ATHENE, the largest research institute for IT security in Europe. He is a visiting professor at the Hebrew University of Jerusalem.

Since 2017, Waidner has also been chief digital officer of Darmstadt.

== Awards and honors ==
- 2018: ACM Distinguished Member

== Publications ==
- Steiner, Michael & Tsudik, Gene & Waidner, Michael. (1999). Diffie-Hellman Key Distribution Extended to Group Communication. Proceedings of the ACM Conference on Computer and Communications Security. DOI: 10.1145/238168.238182.
- Steiner, Michael & Tsudik, Gene & Waidner, Michael. (2000). Key Agreement in Dynamic Peer Groups. IEEE Transactions on Parallel and Distributed Systems. DOI: 11.10.1109/71.877936.
- Asokan, N. & Schunter, Matthias & Waidner, Michael. (1997). Optimistic protocols for fair exchange. Proceedings of the 4th ACM Conference on Computer and Communications Security (CCS '97). ACM, New York, NY, US, 7–17. DOI: 10.1145/266420.266426.
- Asokan, N. & Shoup, Victor & Waidner, Michael. (1998). Optimistic Fair Exchange of Digital Signatures. DOI: 10.1007/BFb0054156.

== Awards ==
He is a Fellow of the IEEE and ACM Distinguished Scientist.
