= Peter Mittelstaedt =

German physicist (1929-2014)

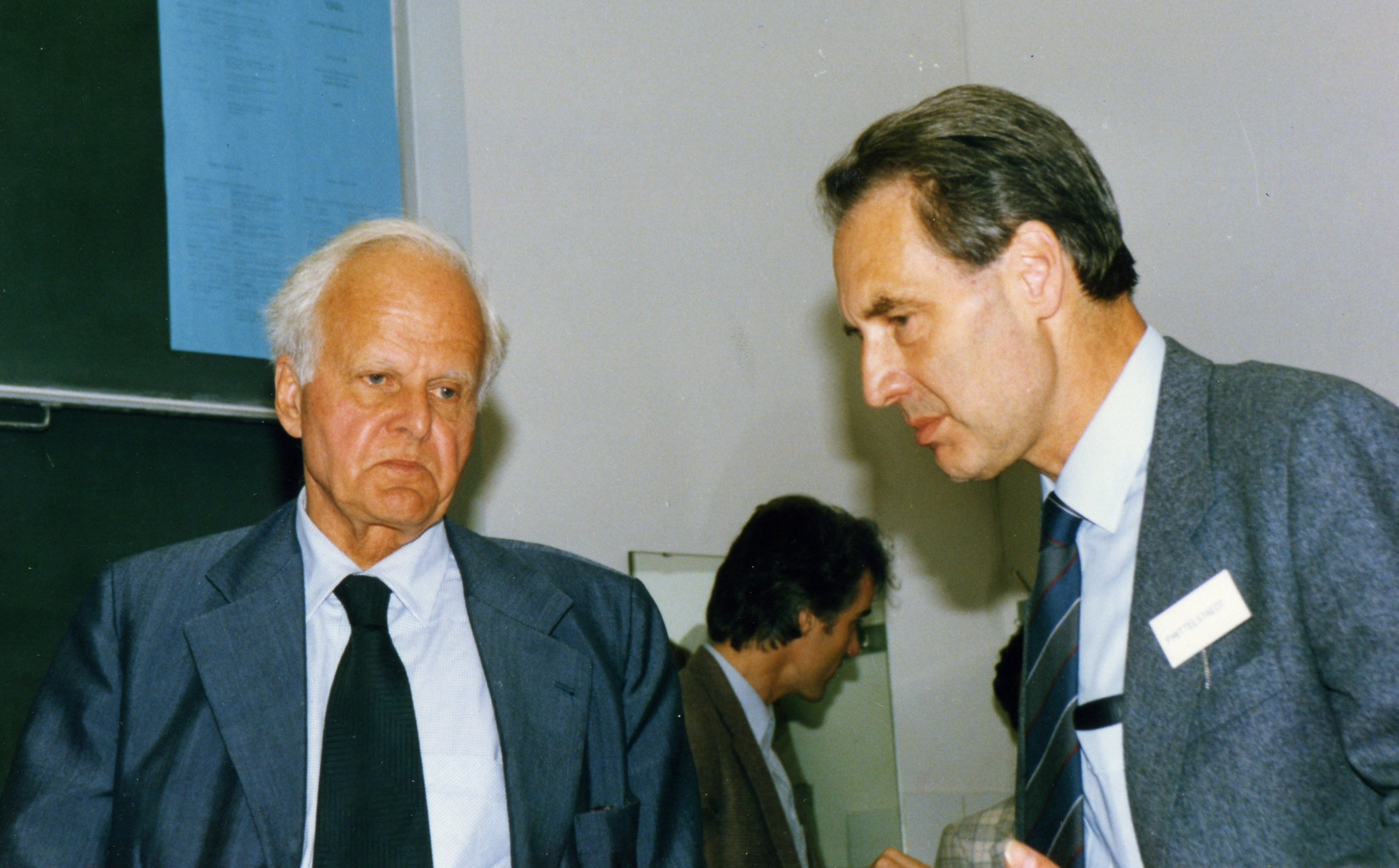
Peter Mittelstaedt (right) And Carl Friedrich von Weizsäcker (left) During the International Symposium on Quantum Logic, Cologne 1984

Peter Mittelstaedt pseudonym Karl Rottmann (born November 24, 1929, in Leipzig - November 21, 2014, in Erftstadt), was a German physicist, philosopher, and scientific theorist.

== Biography ==
After studying physics at the universities of Jena, Bonn, and Göttingen, with a doctorate in theoretical physics in Göttingen in 1956 with Werner Heisenberg, Mittelstaedt had research stays at CERN in Geneva and at MIT in Cambridge, US, and at the then Max Planck Institute for Physics and Astrophysics in Munich, where he also completed his habilitation in 1961. In 1965, Mittelstaedt became a Professor of Theoretical Physics at the University of Cologne, his main areas of work were philosophy of natural science, philosophy of science, and logic as well as the basics of relativity and quantum theory. In 1968, and 1969 he was Dean of the Faculty of Mathematics and Natural Sciences, Rector of the University in 1970 and 1971, Vice-Rector from 1971 to 1973, and later Vice-Rector for Research in Cologne. Mittelstaedt retired in 1995. He was also chairman of the board of directors of the publishing house Bibliographisches Institut. Mittelstaedt died at the age of 84 and was buried in Erftstadt-Lechenich on November 29, 2014, after a memorial service.

He is known for monographs on physics philosophy, where he was influenced by Paul Lorenzen and his operationalism and pursued a justification of quantum mechanics via quantum logic, for which he tried to provide a physical interpretation in his later work.

His total of 30 students, who received their doctorate from 1966 to 1997 with him in Cologne, included Julian Barbour, Hubertus von Grünberg, Wolfgang Hillebrandt, Heinz-Erich Wichmann, Ernst-Walther Stachow, Franz Josef Burghardt, Hans-Joachim Blome and Paul Busch.

His grandfather was the lawyer at the Imperial Court of Justice Johannes Mittelstaedt and his great-grandfather was the Imperial Judicial Councilor and journalist Otto Mittelstaedt (1834–1899).

== Publications ==
=== Books ===
- as Karl Rottmann: Mathematische Formelsammlung, BI Wissenschaftsverlag 1960
- as Karl Rottmann: Winkelfunktionen und logarithmische Funktionen, BI Wissenschaftsverlag 1966 (Hochschultaschenbücher 113/113a)
- Philosophische Probleme der modernen Physik, BI 1963 (7. Aufl. 1989)
- Klassische Mechanik, BI 1970 (2. Aufl. 1995)
- Die Sprache der Physik: Aufsätze und Vorträge, BI 1972
- Der Zeitbegriff in der Physik. Physikalische und philosophische Untersuchungen zum Zeitbegriff in der klassischen und relativistischen Physik, BI Wissenschaftsverlag 1976 (3. Aufl. 1989)
- Quantum Logic, Dordrecht, Reidel 1978
- Sprache und Realität in der modernen Physik, BI 1986
- with Paul Busch, Pekka J. Lahti: The Quantum Theory of Measurement, Springer, Lecturenotes in Physics, 1991, 2. Auflage 1996
- The Interpretation of Quantum Mechanics and the Measurement Process, Cambridge University Press 1998 (paperback 2004)
- with Paul A. Weingartner: Laws of Nature, Springer 2005
- Rational Reconstructions of Modern Physics, Springer, Dordrecht 2011, ISBN 978-94-007-0076-5.

=== Editor (excerpt) ===
- with Pekka J. Lahti: Symposium on the Foundations of Modern Physics, 1985, 1987, 1990
- with Paul Busch und Pekka J. Lahti: Symposium on the Foundations of Modern Physics, 1993
