= Wolfgang Wahlster =

German artificial intelligence researcher

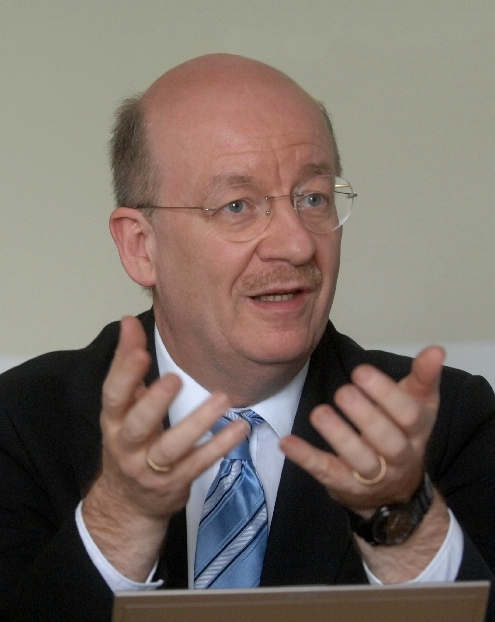
- Born: February 2, 1953 (age 73); Saarbrücken, Saar Protectorate
- Education: Hamburg University
- Awards: Deutscher Zukunftspreis
- Scientific career
- Fields: Artificial intelligence
- Thesis: Theorie, Entwurf und Implementation einer Erklärungskomponente für approximative Inferenzprozesse in natürlich-sprachlichen Dialogsystemen (1981)
- Doctoral advisor: Wilfried Brauer
- Doctoral students: Bernhard Nebel

Wolfgang Wahlster (born February 2, 1953) is a German artificial intelligence researcher. He was CEO and Scientific Director of the German Research Center for Artificial Intelligence and full professor of computer science at Saarland University, Saarbrücken. Wahlster remains Chief Executive Advisor of the German Research Center for Artificial Intelligence. In May 2019, he was honored by the Gesellschaft für Informatik as one of 10 most important heads of German artificial intelligence history. He is sometimes called the inventor of the "Industry 4.0" term.

Wahlster was one of the initiators of the Hermes Award, given each year since 2004 at the Hannover Messe and for many years was the Chairman of the Hermes Award Jury.

In 2016, he was elected to the University Council of the Technische Universität Darmstadt.

== Education ==
Wahlster graduated from the Max-Planck Gymnasium in Delmenhorst. From 1972 to 1977 he studied computer science and theoretical linguistics at the University of Hamburg, where he received his diploma in 1977. In 1981 he received his doctorate in computer science from the University of Hamburg.

== Awards and recognition ==
Wahlster was awarded the Deutscher Zukunftspreis ("German Future Award") in 2001 and has been a foreign member of the Class for Engineering Sciences of the Royal Swedish Academy of Sciences since 2003. In 2004, he was elected as a fellow of the Gesellschaft für Informatik.

In 2020, Wahlster was awarded an honorary title doctor honoris causa of Czech Technical University (CTU) in Prague and in 2021 elected as an honorary foreign member of the Engineering Academy of the Czech Republic (EACR).

In 2025 he received the Rudolf-Diesel-Medaille in the “Best Innovation Promotion” category.
