= European Conference on Artificial Intelligence =

- Host country: Europe
- Date: since 1974

Key points
- Artificial Intelligence

The European Conference on Artificial Intelligence (ECAI) is the leading conference in the field of Artificial Intelligence in Europe, and is commonly listed together with IJCAI and AAAI as one of the three major general AI conferences worldwide. The conference series has been held without interruption since 1974, originally under the name AISB. The conference was originally held biennially, but has been organized annually since ECAI 2022.

The conferences are held under the auspices of the European Coordinating Committee for Artificial Intelligence (ECCAI) and organized by one of the member societies. The journal AI Communications, sponsored by the same society, regularly publishes special issues in which conference attendees report on the conference.

Publication of a paper in ECAI is considered by some journals to be archival: the paper should be considered equivalent to a journal publication and that the contents of ECAI papers cannot be reformulated as separate journal submissions unless a significant amount of new material is added.

== List of ECAI conferences ==
- ECAI-1992 took place in Vienna, Austria.
- ECAI-1996 took place in Budapest, Hungary.
- ECAI-1998 tool place in Brighton, United Kingdom.
- ECAI-2000 took place in Berlin, Germany.
- ECAI-2004 took place in Valencia, Spain.
- ECAI-2006 took place in Riva del Garda, Italy.
- ECAI-2008 took place in Patras, Greece.
- ECAI-2010 took place in Lisbon, Portugal.
- ECAI-2012 took place in Montpellier, France.
- ECAI-2014 took place in Prague, Czech Republic.
- ECAI-2016 took place in The Hague, Netherlands.
- ECAI-2018 took place in Stockholm, Sweden.
- ECAI-2020 took place in Santiago de Compostela, Spain.
- ECAI-2022 took place in Vienna, Austria.
- ECAI-2023 took place in Kraków, Poland.
- ECAI-2024 took place in Santiago de Compostela, Spain.
- ECAI-2025 took place in Bologna, Italy.
