= International Joint Conference on Artificial Intelligence =

Organization and scientific conference on AI

- Abbreviation: IJCAI
- Discipline: artificial intelligence

Publication details
- History: 1969–present
- Frequency: Biennially (1969-2015) Annually (2016-present)
- Open access: yes (https://www.ijcai.org/all_proceedings)
- Website: https://www.ijcai.org

The International Joint Conference on Artificial Intelligence (IJCAI) is a conference in the field of artificial intelligence. The conference series has been organized by the nonprofit IJCAI Organization since 1969. It was held biennially in odd-numbered years from 1969 to 2015 and annually starting from 2016. More recently, IJCAI was held jointly every four years with ECAI since 2018 and PRICAI since 2020 to promote collaboration of AI researchers and practitioners. IJCAI covers a broad range of research areas in the field of AI. It is a large and highly selective conference, with only about 20% or less of the submitted papers accepted after peer review in the 5 years leading up to 2022.

== Awards ==
Three research awards are given at each IJCAI conference.

- The IJCAI Computers and Thought Award is given to outstanding young scientists under the age of 35 in AI.
- The Donald E. Walker Distinguished Service Award is given to honor senior scientists for their contributions and service to the field of AI.
- The IJCAI Award for Research Excellence is given to scientists who have carried out a research program of consistently high quality throughout an entire career yielding several substantial results.

Additionally, IJCAI presents one or more Best Paper Awards at each conference to recognize the highest quality papers.

== Organization ==
The International Joint Conferences on Artificial Intelligence Organization (IJCAI Organization) is a nonprofit organization founded in 1969 to promote science and education in the field of AI. It is the main organizer of the IJCAI conference series and is also responsible for handling related activities. The organization is also the official host for the editorial operations of the Artificial Intelligence journal (AIJ).

== Locations ==
- IJCAI 2025 Palais des congrès de Montréal, Montreal, Quebec, Canada
- IJCAI 2024 International Convention Center Jeju, Jeju Island, South Korea
- (Macau) IJCAI 2023 Sheraton Grand Macao, Macao, China
- IJCAI 2022 Messe Wien Exhibition and Congress Center, Vienna, Austria
- IJCAI 2021 Virtual Conference, Montreal, Quebec, Canada
- IJCAI 2020 Virtual Conference, Yokohama, Japan
- (Macau) IJCAI 2019 The Venetian Macao, Macao, China
- IJCAI 2018 Stockholmsmässan, Stockholm, Sweden
- IJCAI 2017 Melbourne Convention and Exhibition Centre, Melbourne, Australia
- IJCAI 2016 New York Hilton Midtown, New York, United States
- IJCAI 2015 Buenos Aires, Argentina
- IJCAI 2013 Beijing, China
- IJCAI 2011 Barcelona, Spain
- IJCAI 2009 Pasadena, California, United States
- IJCAI 2007 Hyderabad, India
- IJCAI 2005 Edinburgh, United Kingdom
- IJCAI 2003 Acapulco, Mexico
- IJCAI 2001 Seattle, Washington, United States
- IJCAI 1999 Stockholm, Sweden
- IJCAI 1997 Nagoya, Chūbu, Japan
- IJCAI 1995 Montreal, Quebec, Canada
- IJCAI 1993 Chambéry, Savoie, France
- IJCAI 1991 Sydney, New South Wales, Australia
- IJCAI 1989 Detroit, Michigan, United States
- IJCAI 1987 Milan, Italy
- IJCAI 1985 Los Angeles, California, United States
- IJCAI 1983 Karlsruhe, West Germany
- IJCAI 1981 University of British Columbia Vancouver, British Columbia, Canada
- IJCAI 1979 Tokyo, Japan
- IJCAI 1977 Massachusetts Institute of Technology, Cambridge, Massachusetts, United States
- IJCAI 1975 Tbilisi, Georgia, Soviet Union
- IJCAI 1973 Stanford University, California, United States
- IJCAI 1971 London, United Kingdom
- IJCAI 1969 Washington, D.C., United States

== See also ==
- List of computer science conferences
