= Claudia Eckert (computer scientist) =

German computer scientist

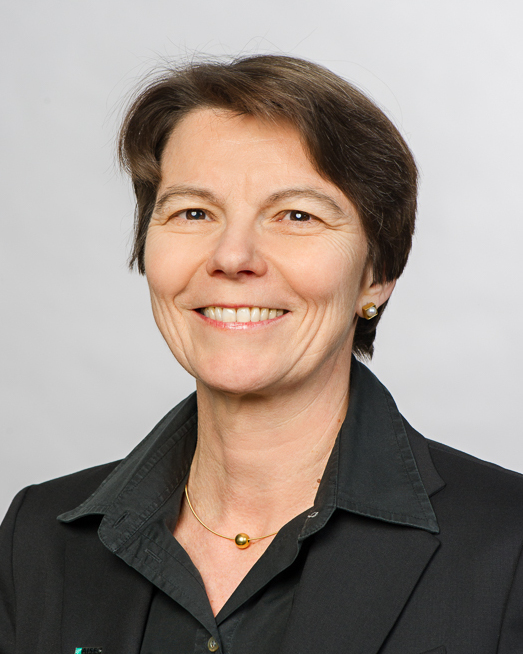
Eckert in 2015

Claudia Eckert (born 1959) is a German computer scientist specializing in middleware, computer security, malware, and the use of machine learning techniques to detect malware. She is managing director of the Fraunhofer Institute for Applied and Integrated Security in Garching, Germany (near Munich), and professor and chair for security in computer science in the School of Computation, Information and Technology of the Technical University of Munich.

== Education and career ==
Eckert was born in 1959 in Duisburg. After studying computer science at the University of Bonn, she completed a Ph.D. in 1993 at the Technical University of Munich, with the dissertation Konzepte und Verfahren zur Konstruktion sicherer, verteilter Systeme.

After a professorship at the University of Bremen, she became chair for IT security at the Technische Universität Darmstadt in 2001, and headed the Fraunhofer Institute for Secure Information Technology in Darmstadt from 2001 to 2011. In 2008 she moved to Munich, as professor for IT security at the Technical University of Munich and head of the Fraunhofer Institute for Applied and Integrated Security.

In 2011, the trade journal Computerwoche named Eckert one of the top 100 most influential figures in the German ICT landscape. The criteria for inclusion in the list included, among other things, the weight of their voice in the industry, vision, special merits, individual professional achievement, and prospective future role.

== Recognition ==
Eckert is a member and since 2025 the president of acatech. She serves as chairwoman of the Board of Trustees of ESYS – Energy Systems of the Future, a joint initiative of acatech, Leopoldina, and the Union of Academies. She also is a member the German Academy of Science and Engineering, and of the Bavarian Academy of Sciences and Humanities.

She received the Bavarian Order of Merit in 2021. In 2022, Manager Magazine named Eckert to their Hall of Fame of German Research.

== Selected publications ==
- Müller, Sascha; Katzenbeisser, Stefan; Eckert, Claudia (2008), "Distributed attribute-based encryption", in Lee, Pil Joong; Cheon, Jung Hee (eds.), Information Security and Cryptology – ICISC 2008, 11th International Conference, Seoul, Korea, December 3–5, 2008, Revised Selected Papers, Lecture Notes in Computer Science, vol. 5461, Springer, pp. 20–36, doi:10.1007/978-3-642-00730-9_2, ISBN 978-3-642-00729-3
- Xiao, Huang; Biggio, Battista; Brown, Gavin; Fumera, Giorgio; Eckert, Claudia; Roli, Fabio (2015), "Is feature selection secure against training data poisoning?", in Bach, Francis R.; Blei, David M. (eds.), Proceedings of the 32nd International Conference on Machine Learning, ICML 2015, Lille, France, 6-11 July 2015, JMLR Workshop and Conference Proceedings, vol. 37, JMLR.org, pp. 1689–1698
- Kolosnjaji, Bojan; Zarras, Apostolis; Webster, George D.; Eckert, Claudia (2016), "Deep learning for classification of malware system call sequences", in Kang, Byeong Ho; Bai, Quan (eds.), AI 2016: Advances in Artificial Intelligence – 29th Australasian Joint Conference, Hobart, TAS, Australia, December 5–8, 2016, Proceedings, Lecture Notes in Computer Science, vol. 9992, Springer, pp. 137–149, doi:10.1007/978-3-319-50127-7_11, ISBN 978-3-319-50126-0
- Kolosnjaji, Bojan; Demontis, Ambra; Biggio, Battista; Maiorca, Davide; Giacinto, Giorgio; Eckert, Claudia; Roli, Fabio (2018), "Adversarial malware binaries: evading deep learning for malware detection in executables", 26th European Signal Processing Conference, EUSIPCO 2018, Roma, Italy, September 3–7, 2018, IEEE, pp. 533–537, arXiv:1803.04173, doi:10.23919/EUSIPCO.2018.8553214, ISBN 978-9-0827-9701-5
