= Taurob tracker =

Taurob tracker is a mobile robot, manufactured by Taurob GmbH in Austria. It has been originally developed as a remote controlled reconnaissance platform for fire departments. but is currently used also by the military, civil-defense units, universities and the oil and gas industry around the world.

Since 2013 an ATEX Zone 1 certified variant, called Taurob Tracker Ex is available, which is able to drive in explosive atmospheres safely.

A taurob tracker version with sensors for environments with extreme smoke (e.g. fires in tunnels or subway stations) is currently being developed in the EU funded "SmokeBot" project

== Specifications ==
| Dimensions | 100 x 58 x 42 cm |
| Weight | 60 kg |
| Payload | 25 kg |
| Operating Distance (Line of sight) | 500 – 1000 m |
| Speed | 7 km/h |
| Temperature Range | -20 °C to +60 °C |
| Battery Endurance | 3 hrs. (driving), 10 hrs. (measuring) |
| Certifications | ATEX, IP 67 |
| Max. Climb Capabilities | 40°, 35 cm obstacles, stairs |
| Arm – Mobility | 4 Degrees of Freedom |
| Arm – Max. Reach | 140 cm |
| Arm – Max. Lifting Capacity | 5 kg fully extended |

== Track assembly ==
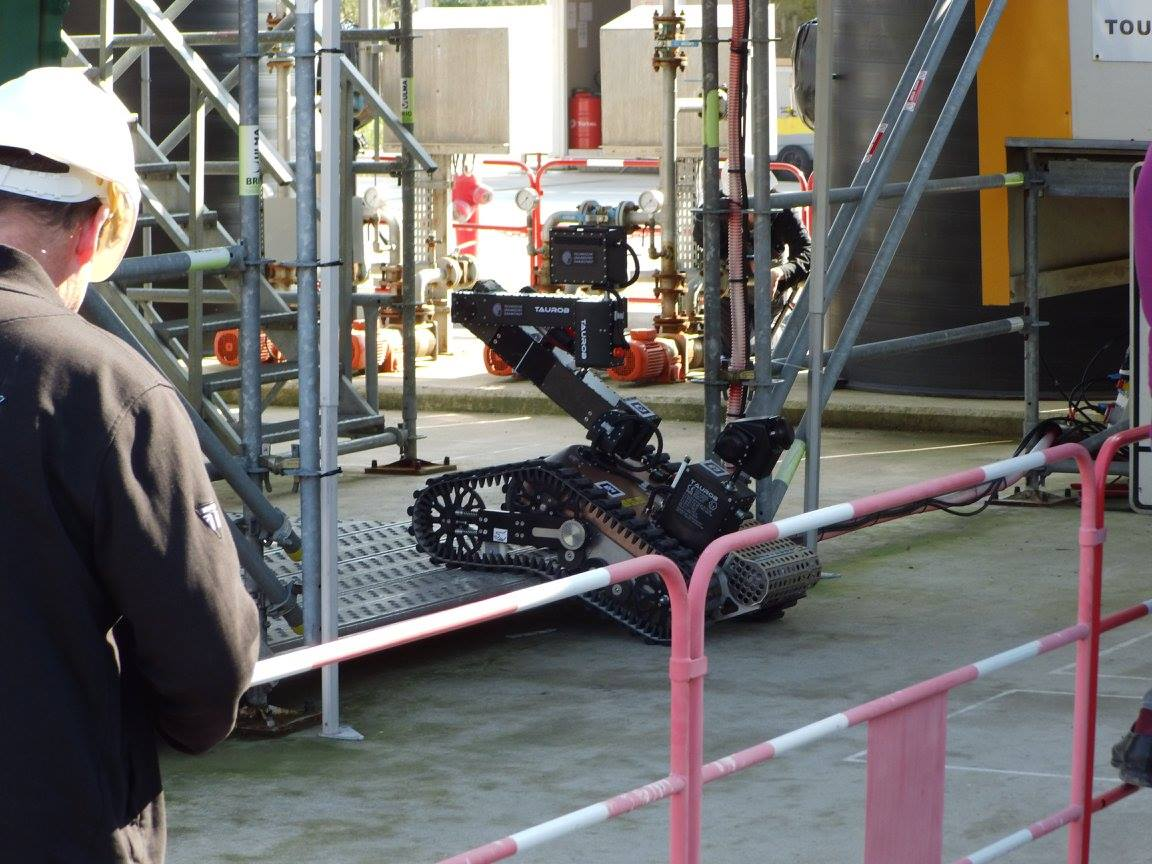
Argonaut robot with forward wheels lowered for better climbing traction

Compared to most other mobile robots, the taurob tracker has a unique track geometry which allows it to climb over obstacles with just one pair of tracks. Due this geometry the tracks do not lose their tension when raising or lowering the front wheels. Further advantages include improved traction (thus the name of the robot) on uneven ground and a rapid track exchange mechanism.

== Notable appearances ==
In 2016 a taurob tracker platform was used in the RoboCup Rescue League by team Hector.

In 2017 a variant of taurob tracker called "Argonaut" has won the ARGOS Challenge organised by Total Energies. It is the first fully autonomous, ATEX certified mobile inspection robot for Oil and Gas installations. According to Total it will be used on their industrial sites by 2020.
