= European Association for Artificial Intelligence =

European learned society for artificial intelligence

- Abbreviation: EurAI
- Formation: 1982
- Type: Learned society
- Region served: Europe
- Website: www.eurai.org

The European Association for Artificial Intelligence (EurAI), formerly the European Coordinating Committee for Artificial Intelligence (ECCAI), is a European organization representing national artificial intelligence societies and research communities. Its aim is to promote the study, research, and application of artificial intelligence (AI) in Europe.

== History ==
The organization was founded on 14 July 1982 in Orsay, France, as the European Coordinating Committee for Artificial Intelligence (ECCAI). Its founding president was Wolfgang Bibel. In 2015, ECCAI was renamed the European Association for Artificial Intelligence (EurAI).

== Organization ==
EurAI is a federation of national artificial intelligence societies across Europe. Its members represent AI research communities in their respective countries, and the organization coordinates activities and collaboration at the European level.

== Activities ==
EurAI organizes and supports initiatives to promote artificial intelligence research and collaboration in Europe.

=== Conferences ===
EurAI organizes the European Conference on Artificial Intelligence (ECAI), which was held biennially until 2022 and has been held annually since 2023.

According to the CiTIUS research centre, ECAI is one of the major artificial intelligence conferences in Europe.

=== Awards ===
EurAI sponsors several awards, including the Artificial Intelligence Dissertation Award, which recognizes outstanding doctoral research in artificial intelligence.

== Fellows program ==
The EurAI Fellows program, established in 1999, recognizes individuals who have made significant and sustained contributions to artificial intelligence in Europe.
