= ARGOS Challenge =

Robotics competition (2013-2017)

ARGOS Challenge logo

The ARGOS Challenge was a robotic competition sponsored by Total between 2013 and 2017 and co-organized with Agence nationale de la recherche. The acronym ARGOS stands for Autonomous Robot for Gas and Oil Sites.

After a gas leak occurred at the Elgin-Franklin fields and resulted in a months long shut down of production and evacuation of personnel, Total decided to apply an open-innovation approach to develop robots for increasing the safety of oil and gas production sites.

The competition was won by an Austrian-German team called "Argonauts", consisting of members from Austrian robot maker Taurob GmbH and TU Darmstadt with a variant of the taurob tracker robot.
