= Andreas Reuter =

German computer science professor

- Born: October 31, 1949; Brandis, East Germany
- Education: Technische Universität Darmstadt
- Occupation: Computer scientist
- Employers: University of Kaiserslautern; University of Stuttgart; International University (Bruchsal); EML European Media Laboratory GmbH; Heidelberg Institute for Theoretical Studies; University of Heidelberg
- Known for: Work on database, transaction processing systems and parallel and distributed computer systems

Andreas Reuter (born October 31, 1949) is a German computer science professor and research manager. His research focuses on databases, transaction systems, and parallel and distributed computer systems. Reuter has been scientific and executive director of EML European Media Laboratory GmbH and gGmbH since 1998 and Managing Director of the Heidelberg Institute for Theoretical Studies (HITS gGmbH) from 2010 until 2016. In October 2015, he was appointed Senior Professor at the University of Heidelberg.

== Life and career ==
During his school time he volunteered in the company founded by Konrad Zuse in Bad Hersfeld. After graduating in 1968, he worked as a freelance programmer for companies and authorities. From 1973 on, he studied computer science at the Technical University of Munich and at the Department of Computer Science of the Technische Universität Darmstadt. He completed his studies in Darmstadt with a diplom in 1978. As a researcher he received his doctorate degree (Dr.-Ing.) under Theo Härder and Hartmut Wedekind in 1981. He worked as an assistant professor at the University of Kaiserslautern from 1981 to 1983. In 1983 he was employed as a postdoc at the IBM Research Center in San José. In 1985 he was appointed professor at the University of Stuttgart, where he became the founding director of the Institute for Parallel and Distributed High-Performance Computer Systems in 1988. From 1992 until 1996 he was Vice-President for Academic Affairs at the University of Stuttgart. In 1996 he declined an offered position as director at the Max Planck Institute for Computer Science in Saarbrücken. Instead, from 1997 on he co-founded and developed the private "International University in Germany", where he worked as dean and vice-president until 2004.

On January 1, 1998 he was appointed scientific and managing director of the EML European Media Laboratory GmbH, which Klaus Tschira had founded in 1997. Together with Klaus Tschira, he was essentially involved in building up the company and its affiliate, EML Research gGmbH (from 2003 on). In 2010 EML Research became the Heidelberg Institute for Theoretical Studies, whose managing director he was until April 2016.

In 2007, Andreas Reuter accepted the endowed chair for “Dependable Systems”, supported by the Klaus Tschira Foundation, at the University of Kaiserslautern. In 2011 he transferred to Heidelberg University. There he held an endowed chair for “Distributed Systems”, also supported by the Klaus Tschira Foundation. The Technical University of Donetsk (Ukraine) awarded him an honorary doctorate in 1994.

== Research and positions ==
Andreas Reuter’s research focuses on the field of databases, transaction systems, and parallel and distributed computer systems. Together with the Turing Award laureate James "Jim" Gray he published the book "Transaction Processing: Concepts and Techniques" in 1992, which became a standard reference work for researchers and developers around the world and was translated among others into Chinese and Japanese. He developed a definition of the transactional processing model in (distributed) databases along with Theo Härder, a model which to this day is often quoted by his acronym ACID (atomicity, consistency, isolation, durability). In addition to his research Andreas Reuter conducted numerous consulting projects and held lectures on many topics in both the university and industrial sectors. He is involved in numerous advisory boards both in academia and industry and is among other positions an External Scientific Member of the Max Planck Institute for Computer Science (MPII) in Saarbrücken and of the Board of Trustees of the Max Planck Institute for Astronomy (MPIA) in Heidelberg.

== Recognition ==
He was elected as an ACM Fellow in 2019 "for contributions to database concurrency control and for service to the community".
