= Föppl =

Föppl is a surname. Notable people with the surname include:

- August Föppl (1854–1924), German engineer and university lecturer
- Ludwig Föppl (1887–1976), German mechanical engineer, cryptoanalyst, and university lecturer
- Otto Föppl (1885–1963), German engineer and university lecturer
