= Nazir Peroz =

German computer scientist (born 1955)

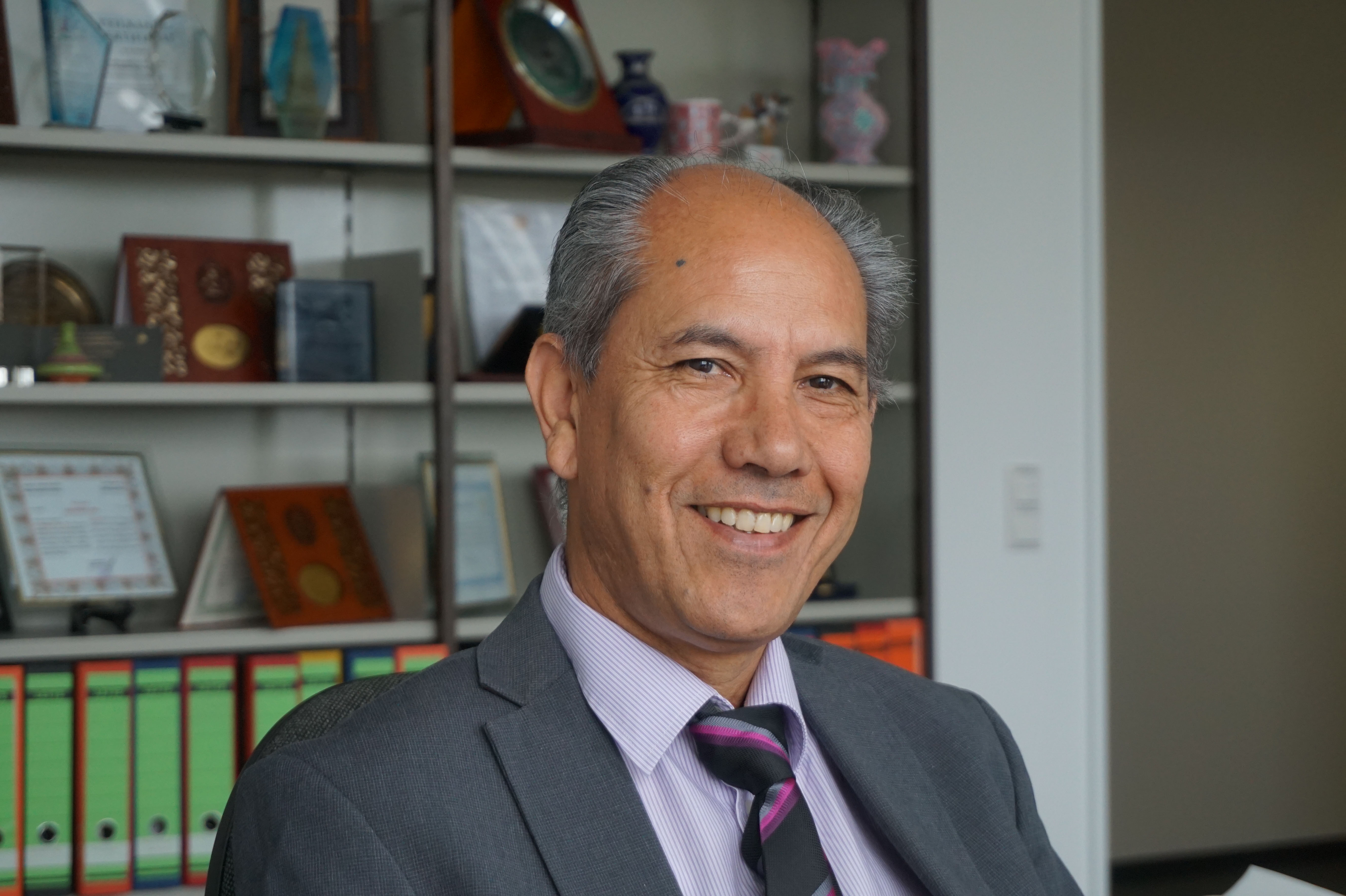

Academic work
- Discipline: computer science

Nazir Peroz (born 1955 in Kabul) is a German/Afghan computer scientist whose research focus is on IT in Afghanistan and other developing countries.

== Background ==
He decided to study in Berlin, Germany in 1977.

In 1999, Peroz founded the Zentrum für internationale und interkulturelle Kommunikation (ZiiK) at his faculty, which he has headed since 2000. In this capacity, he has been actively involved in the reconstruction of his home country Afghanistan since 2001. Between 2003 and 2014, he established five IT centers at the universities Kabul University, Herat, Nangarhar, Balkh and Kandahar. In 2007, he established a master program in computer science for Afghan lecturers at the TU Berlin and founded an IT competence center in Kabul (ITCC Afghanistan).

Peroz is an expert at the Department of Computer Science and Society of the Gesellschaft für Informatik (GI e. V.), from 1996 to 2010 there as speaker of the department "Informatics and Third World" (today "Informatics and Social Development"). From 1996 to 2006 he was a member of the Development Planning Department of the TU Berlin, since 2002 he was the DAAD Coordinator for Information Technology and Computer Science for Afghanistan, since 2003 Advisor to the Afghan Ministry of Higher Education, since 2017 "Brain City Berlin Ambassador".

== Honors and awards ==
- 2012: Honorary Professor of the University of Herat
- 2015: Prize of the Faculty of Electrical Engineering and Computer Science
- 2016: Sayed Djamal ad-Din Afghani Medal, highest state award in the field of science in Afghanistan

== Publications (selection) ==
- Mahr, B., Peroz, N.: Establishing Academic Structures in Computer Science at Herat University, IKO-Verlag 2006, ISBN 978-3889398321
- Peroz, N.: Framework for a Functional IT Supply in Higher Education in Afghanistan, LIT-Verlag 2009, ISBN 978-3-643-10225-6
- Peroz, N.: Strategieentwicklung für bestimmte Entwicklungsländer im Bereich Informationstechnologie book on demand, ISBN 978-3-86805-672-3
- Peroz, N.: Digitale Revolution? Soziale Netzwerke in Nordafrika In: Wissenschaft & Frieden 2011-4, Darmstadt, page 31-32
- Peroz, N.: Establishing IT Structures at Kabul University IKO Publishing House 2013, ISBN 9783889398963

== Memberships (selection) ==
- Department of Computer Science and Society of Gesellschaft für Informatik e.V.
