= Guido Moerkotte =

German computer scientist

- Citizenship: German
- Education: University of Karlsruhe (TH)
- Known for: Query Optimization
- Scientific career
- Fields: Computer Science
- Workplaces: University of Mannheim; University of Aachen
- Thesis: Inkonsistenzen in deduktiven Datenbanken: Diagnose und Reparatur (1990)
- Doctoral advisor: Peter Lockemann
- Doctoral students: Thomas Neumann

Guido Moerkotte is full professor of computer science at the University of Mannheim and known for his research on query optimization within database systems.

== Life ==
Moerkotte started studying computer science at the University of Dortmund in 1981 and finished his doctoral studies under the supervision of Peter Lockemann at the University of Karlsruhe (TH) in 1990. After positions as guest researcher at IBM and visiting researcher at Microsoft, he joined the University of Aachen as associate professor in January 1994. Since January 1996, he holds the chair of Practical Computer Science III as a full professor at the University of Mannheim.

== Research ==
With more than 200 publications including three books, Moerkotte's research focuses on database systems, especially query optimization. In his early years, he conducted research on deductive databases and together with Alfons Kemper he worked on object-oriented databases when he was employed in Karlsruhe. Nowadays he is giving courses on query optimization and working on query compilers.

== Books ==
- Konstruktion von Anfrageoptimierern für Objektbanken. Verlag Shaker, Aachen 1995, ISBN 3-8265-0869-6, 1994
- with Alfons Kemper: Object-Oriented Database Management: Applications in Engineering and Computer Science. Prentice-Hall 1994, ISBN 0-13-629239-9
- Building Query Compilers
