= Ingo Wegener =

German computer scientist

Ingo Wegener (December 4, 1950 in Bremen – November 26, 2008 in Bielefeld) was an influential German computer scientist working in the field of theoretical computer science.

== Education and career ==
Wegener was educated at the Bielefeld University. He earned a diploma in mathematics there in 1976, a doctorate in 1978, and a habilitation in 1981. His doctoral dissertation, Boolesche Funktionen, deren monotone Komplexität fast quadratisch ist, was jointly supervised by Wolfgang Paul and Rudolf Ahlswede.

He was a computer science professor at Goethe University Frankfurt from 1980 until 1987, when he moved to the Technical University of Dortmund. He remained at Dortmund until his death.

== Contributions ==
Wegener's dissertation research concerned circuit complexity, and he was known for his research on Boolean functions and binary decision diagrams. He wrote two books on related topics, The Complexity of Boolean Functions (Wiley, 1987, also called "the blue book") and Branching Programs and Binary Decision Diagrams: Theory and Applications (SIAM Press, 2000).

Beginning in the 1990s, his research interests shifted towards the theoretical analysis of metaheuristics and evolutionary computation.

== Awards and honors ==
Wegener was elected as a fellow of the German society for computer science, the Gesellschaft für Informatik, in 2004. For his merits on teaching and research in the field of theoretical computer science, he earned in 2006 the Konrad Zuse Medal from the Gesellschaft für Informatik.
