= Robert Piloty =

German computer scientist (1924–2013)

Robert Piloty (6 June 1924, in Munich – 21 January 2013) was a German computer scientist and former Professor of Communications Processing at the Faculty of Electrical Engineering of the Technische Universität Darmstadt. He was one of the pioneers in the construction of program-controlled computer systems and the founding father of computer science courses in Germany. As a member of the advisory board and chairman of the commission for the introduction of computer science studies in Germany, he was significantly involved in the introduction and design of computer science studies throughout Germany. His efforts also led to the establishment of the first computer science course at TU Darmstadt.

Piloty was a founding member of the Gesellschaft für Informatik. As a member of the general assembly and vice president of the International Federation for Information Processing (IFIP), Piloty had represented German computer science internationally for many years.

His research has covered a wide range of areas, from microwave technology, computer-aided circuit design and hardware description languages (HDLs) to design databases.

== Life ==
Piloty was born on 6 June 1924 as the son of Hans Piloty. After studying electrical engineering, he received his doctorate in microwave technology from the Technical University of Munich under the supervision of Hans Heinrich Meinke. Inspired by a study visit to the Massachusetts Institute of Technology (MIT), where he visited the Whirlwind I, the Program-Controlled Electronic Calculator Munich (PERM) was created by his initiative and under his technical direction from 1949 at the Technical University of Munich. The PERM project under the overall direction of his father Hans Piloty and his mathematician colleague Robert Sauer established the necessary hardware and software basis for many further research projects in the then emerging field of computer science. The PERM was used for many years in the computer center of the Technical University of Munich and in the training of development engineers for the German computer industry. Today it can be seen in the Deutsches Museum in Munich.

After the end of the PERM activities, Robert Piloty went to Zurich in 1955 as deputy head of the IBM research laboratory and in 1957 took over the management of system planning at the German company Standard Elektrik Lorenz in Stuttgart. In 1961, he became an associate professor at the Technical University of Munich and in 1964 was appointed Professor of Communications Processing at the Faculty of Electrical Engineering of the Technische Universität Darmstadt (TU Darmstadt). There he founded the Institute of Information Processing, which later became the Institute for Computer Engineering. There he developed a hardware description language (HWBS) for the training of engineers, with which computer designs could be simulated. The idea spread quickly and many languages were developed, so that an exchange was very difficult in the end. That is why Piloty founded the international Consensus Language (CONLAN) Working Group in 1975 as part of the IFIP with the aim of creating a basis for standardization.

At TU Darmstadt Piloty worked with Winfried Oppelt on a study plan "Computer Science", which was characterized by engineering science. There was already another curriculum, which came from the Faculty of Mathematics and Physics and provided for a stronger emphasis on software engineering. However, the Faculty of Electrical Engineering was the driving force, which is why in the same year (1968) a computer science course was established at the Faculty of Electrical Engineering on the basis of Pilotys and Oppelts study regulations.

In the spring of 1969, Hartmut Wedekind and Robert Piloty had travelled through the USA together for several weeks to study the faculties of computer science there. On July 7, 1969, the Founding Committee for Computer Science (GAI) was established to constitute the Department of Computer Science. Later, the committee was replaced by a provisional department conference. This conference met for the first time on 15 May 1972, so that on that day the Department of Computer Science was officially established. Wedekind became its first dean and Piloty also became a member of the department.

Piloty retired in 1990.

== Awards ==
- 1980 IFIP Silver Core
- 1985 Federal Cross of Merit, 1st Class
- 1989 Konrad-Zuse-Medal for Services to Computer Science of the Gesellschaft für Informatik
- 1993 Member of the European Academy of Sciences and Arts
- 1997 IEEE Fellow
- 2004 Inauguration of the new computer science building of TU Darmstadt under the name of Robert Piloty
