= Markus Gross =

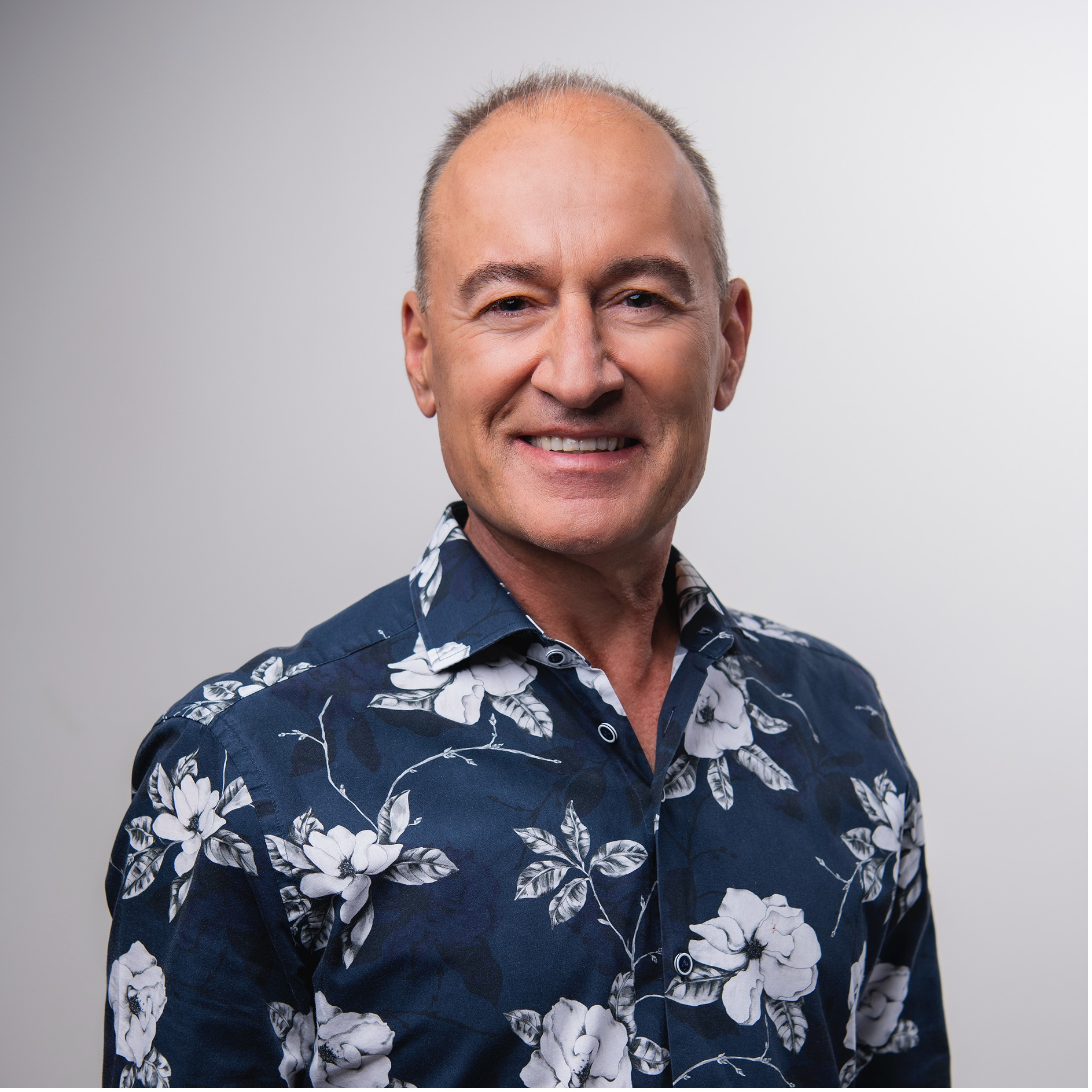
- Markus Gross 2022
- Born: June 14, 1963 (age 63); Saarland, Germany
- Known for: point based graphics, blue-c, physics-based modeling, stereoscopic 3D, video processing, computer animation
- Scientific career
- Fields: Computer Science
- Workplaces: ETH Zurich; Disney Research; The Walt Disney Company
- Website: graphics.ethz.ch/~grossm

Markus Gross (born June 14, 1963, Saarland, Germany) is a Professor of Computer science at the Swiss Federal Institute of Technology Zürich (ETH), head of its Computer Graphics Laboratory, and serves as Chief Scientist at The Walt Disney Studios as well as Director of DisneyResearch|Studios. His research interests include physically based modeling, computer animation, immersive displays, and video technology. He has published more than 430 scientific papers on algorithms and methods in the field of computer graphics and computer vision, and holds more than 30 patents.

== Early life and career ==
Markus Gross was born on June 14, 1963, in Neunkirchen, Saarland, a region historically influenced by both Germany and France during the first half of the 20th century. He was an only child; both of his parents worked part-time as musicians, regularly performing with their own band. Consequently, Gross grew up immersed in popular and jazz music.

He was introduced to animation as a child by Disney's The Jungle Book, after which he started collecting Disney comic books. The character Gyro Gearloose, known for his inventive and eccentric nature, particularly resonated with him and inspired an early interest in electronics and engineering. Encouraged by this passion, he persuaded his parents to purchase a TI-59 programmable calculator, which sparked his interest in microcoding.

Around the age of 14, Gross encountered the Commodore PET computer at his local high school, prompting him to begin programming in BASIC and Pascal. Despite the limited graphical capabilities of early computers, he became fascinated by the potential to represent computational results visually in two and three dimensions. After starting university in the early 1980s, he saw early 3D animated short films by Ed Catmull's team at the New York Institute of Technology, which he has said convinced him to pursue computer graphics.

Gross received a Master of Science in Electrical and Computer Engineering from Saarland University in 1986. He then continued his studies at Saarland University, earning a Ph.D. in Computer Graphics and Image Analysis in 1989 under the supervision of José Luis Encarnação.

From 1990 to 1994, he was a research scientist at the Computer Graphics Center of the Department of Computer Science of the Technical University of Darmstadt from where he received his habilitation in 1995.

== Academic career ==
In 1994, Gross joined the faculty at ETH Zurich, as a professor of computer science and founded the Computer Graphics Laboratory. From 2004 to 2008 he served as a director of the Institute of Computational Sciences at ETH. He was promoted to full professor in 1997. Between 2004 and 2008, Gross served as the director of the Institute of Computational Sciences at ETH Zurich. During his tenure, he led the establishment of two research centers: the Game Technology Center in 2015 and the Media Technology Center in 2019.

Gross has served on papers committees of the major graphics conferences multiple times, including ACM SIGGRAPH, IEEE Visualization, Eurographics, Pacific Graphics, and others. In 2005 he became the first European papers chair of ACM SIGGRAPH. He was the conference co-chair of the Eurographics 2021. In addition, he has been the co-organizer of various international symposia. He has served on the editorial advisory boards of various journals and was associate editor of IEEE Computer Graphics & Applications.

During his tenure, Gross has co-authored more than 700 publications on topics including physically based modeling, immersive displays, video technology, image acquisition and generation, geometric modeling, computer animation, scientific visualization, and multimodal learning. As of June 2025, his current h-index is 117, and his i10-index is 469. He has coauthored 87 SIGGRAPH papers, ranking him among the top contributors in the field. Additionally, he has graduated more than 75 Ph.D. students.

His early research focused on wavelet-based volume rendering, surface meshing, and physically based medical simulations. His team developed finite element methods (FEM) for modeling soft tissue, deformation, collision, fracture, and fluids, as well as real-time 3D soft tissue cutting algorithms. His work on fluid simulation includes the 2003 paper "Particle-based fluid simulation for interactive applications" and has been adoped in movies and video games.

The Wavelet-Turbulence method, for which he received a Technical Achievement Award from the Academy of Motion Picture Arts and Sciences, has been used for smoke and explosion effects in films including “Avatar,” “Kung Fu Panda,” “Iron Man 3”, and “Man of Steel,” “Battleship”.

One of his major technical contributions is his work on point-based graphics, which enables the efficient computation of graphics pipeline processes using points rather than triangles, as in classical computer graphics. His papers “Surfels: Surface Elements as Rendering Primitives,” “Efficient Simplification of Point-Sampled Surfaces,” and “Surface Splatting” have collectively received over 4,100 citations. He is also the co-author of the book “Point-Based Graphics” (Morgan Kaufman, 2007).

Before joining Disney Research, Gross also worked on the theoretical modeling of dyslexia. He developed a statistical model and a multimodal recording system to facilitate language acquisition for people with dyslexia.

== Disney Research ==
In 2008, Gross was recruited by Ed Catmull to help establish a corporate R&D organization at The Walt Disney Company. He was appointed Director of Disney Research Zurich, and later promoted to Vice President of Research in 2018. In 2022, he became the Chief Scientist of The Walt Disney Company.

His research at Disney focuses on novel technologies for filmmaking in collaboration with his Computer Graphics Lab at ETH Zürich. He and his teams worldwide conduct research in video technologies, rendering, digital humans, augmented creativity and audience understanding with a particular emphasis on incorporating machine learning and artificial intelligence into the production pipeline of Disney.

His 2010 paper High-Quality Single-Shot Capture of Facial Geometry laid the foundation for the Disney Medusa Facial Capture system, which has been used in numerous films and contributed to his second Technical Achievement Award award in 2019.

== Entrepreneurship ==
Gross's research led to the establishment of 13 companies and the creation of software platforms, several of which have been acquired.

His work on physically-based modeling for facial surgery simulation (FACE Project) eventually led to the spin-off company Cyfex founded in 2000.

In 2002, he co-founded Novodex, a company focusing on middleware for physics modeling in computer games. The firm was chosen by Ageia as a software platform to support their upcoming PhysX PPU card, which became the basis of the PhysX SDK 2. x series. Aegia acquired Novodex in 2004, and Gross became the chair of the technical advisory committee. In 2008, Ageia was itself acquired by graphics technology manufacturer Nvidia.

Gross’ research on 3D video recording, compression, editing and visual effects led to the creation of the startup-company LiberoVision which in 2012 was acquired by Vizrt and rebranded “Viz Libero”. Broadcasters including ESPN and BBC have used its products.

His research on theoretical modeling of dyslexia resulted in the multimedia learning software Dybuster and the foundation of the company of the same name in 2007.

In 2015, he cofounded the spin-off Kapanu which developed augmented reality and visual computing technology allowing superimposition of smile designs on faces to facilitate the communication between patients and dentists. In 2017, the company was acquired by Ivoclar Vivadent.

In 2018, he cofounded Animatico focusing on development of AI characters for next generation human-machine interaction. To mark the 100th Nobel Prize anniversary of Albert Einstein, who was an ETH Zurich alumni, Gross’s team and Animatico built a platform that allows for a conversation with a “digital Einstein”. In 2022, Animatico was acquired by Nvidia.

In 2018 Gross co-founded Arbrea Labs which develops augmented reality simulators for human bodies, and focuses on surgery pre-visualization.

Other companies he cofounded are Gimalon (2013), Perceptiko (2017), Propulsion Academy (2017), Nanocorp (2018), Percim (2018), Morgen (2020).

== Awards and honors ==
Gross is a Fellow of ACM and the EUROGRAPHICS Association, as well as a member of the German Academy of Sciences Leopoldina and the Berlin-Brandenburg Academy of Sciences and Humanities. Gross has also received multiple awards. The most recent is the Eurographics Gold Medal for his outstanding research contributions, for his contributions in bridging industry and academia, and for his leadership in the field at large. In 2013 he received the Karl Heinz Beckurts Prize for outstanding technological innovations with strong practical relevance. Also in 2013, Gross received the Konrad Zuse Medal of the German association of computer sciences (GI), the highest award for scientific achievements in computer sciences in Germany. From the Academy of Motion Picture Arts and Sciences Markus Gross received a “Tech-Oscar,” also known as the Technical Achievement Award together with Nils Thuerey, Theo Kim, and Doug James for the development of a procedure to simulate smoke and explosions more efficiently. Further, Gross received the Outstanding Technical Contributions Award EUROGRAPHICS in 2010 and the Swiss ICT Champions Award in 2011.

- 2024 Eurographics Gold Medal
- 2021 Steven Anson Coons Award for outstanding creative contributions to computer graphics
- 2021 ETH Dandelion Entrepreneurship Award
- 2019 Technical Achievement Award of the Academy of Motion Picture Arts and Sciences
- 2018 Distinguished Career Award, Eurographics
- 2015 IEEE Visualization Career Awar
- 2013 Karl Heinz Beckurts Prize for outstanding technological innovations with strong practical relevance
- 2013 Konrad Zuse Medal for achievements in computer sciences
- 2013 Technical Achievement Award of the Academy of Motion Picture Arts and Sciences
- 2012 Fellow of the Association for Computing Machinery (ACM)
- 2012 Fellow of the Berlin-Brandenburg Academy of Sciences and Humanities
- 2012 Fellow of the German Academy of Sciences Leopoldina
- 2011 Swiss ICT Award
- 2010 Outstanding Technical Contribution Award, Eurographics
- 2006 Fellow of the Eurographics Association

== Selected Publications ==
According to Google Scholar, as of July 2025, his most cited papers are

- "A benchmark dataset and evaluation methodology for video object segmentation". by F Perazzi, J Pont-Tuset, B McWilliams, L Van Gool, M Gross, A Sorkine-Hornung. Proceedings of the IEEE conference on computer vision and pattern recognition, 2016. (2491 cites)
- "Particle-based fluid simulation for interactive applications." by M Müller, D Charypar, M Gross. Proceedings of the 2003 ACM SIGGRAPH/Eurographics symposium on Computer animation. Eurographics Association, 2003. (2048 cites)
- "Efficient simplification of point-sampled surfaces." by M Pauly, M Gross, LP Kobbelt. Proceedings of the conference on Visualization'02. IEEE Computer Society, 2002. (1560 cites)
- "Surfels: Surface elements as rendering primitives". by H Pfister, M Zwicker, J Van Baar, M Gross. Proceedings of the 27th annual conference on Computer graphics and interactive techniques. ACM Press/Addison-Wesley Publishing Co., 2000. (1504 cites)
- "Towards better understanding of gradient-based attribution methods for deep neural networks". by M Ancona, E Ceolini, C Öztireli, M Gross. Proceedings of the International Conference on Learning Representations (ICLR), 2018. (1398 cites)
- "Surface splatting." M Zwicker, H Pfister, J Van Baar, M Gross. Proceedings of the 28th annual conference on Computer graphics and interactive techniques. ACM, 2001.(1091 cites)
- "Meshless deformations based on shape matching." M Müller, B Heidelberger, M Teschner, M Gross. ACM transactions on graphics (TOG). ACM, 2005. (867 cites)
