= Christine Regitz =

German computer scientist

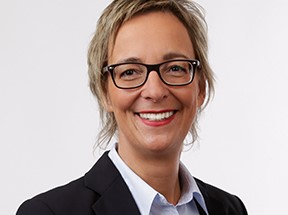
Regitz in 2019

Christine Regitz (born 1966) is a German computer scientist who works for SAP as vice president and global head of SAP Women in Tech, and is president of the German Informatics Society.

Regitz earned a diploma (the German equivalent of a master's degree) in business administration from Saarland University in 1991, and did a year of postgraduate study at the University of Bari in Italy. After working in industry and as a consultant, she began working for DACOS Software in 1994, and joined SAP when it acquired DACOS in 1996. She became a vice president at SAP in 2011, and has been vice president and global head of SAP Women in Tech since 2020.

Regitz was the 2018 recipient of the FTAfelicitas Prize of Femtec Alumnae, a German organization for women in STEM, in the "Role Model MINT" category. In 2021, Regitz was elected as president of the German Informatics Society, for a term beginning in 2022. She became the first woman president of the society.
