= Graphical Kernel System =

First ISO standard for low-level computer graphics

- Abbreviation: GKS
- Year started: 1977; 48 years ago
- Latest version: ISO/IEC 7942-4:1998; 1998; 27 years ago
- Organization: ANSI, ISO, IEC
- Related standards: ANSI X3.124, ISO 8651, ISO 8805, ISO/IEC 8806, ISO 10303
- Domain: Computer graphics

The Graphical Kernel System (GKS) is a 2D computer graphics system using vector graphics, introduced in 1977. It was suitable for making line and bar charts and similar tasks. A key concept was cross-system portability, based on an underlying coordinate system that could be represented on almost any hardware. GKS is best known as the basis for the graphics in the GEM GUI system used on the Atari ST and as part of Ventura Publisher.

A draft international standard was circulated for review in September 1983. Final ratification of the standard was achieved in 1985, making it the first ISO graphics standard.

A 3D system modelled on GKS was introduced as PHIGS, which saw some use in the 1980s and early 1990s.

== Overview ==
GKS provides a set of drawing features for two-dimensional vector graphics suitable for charting and similar duties. The calls are designed to be portable across different programming languages, graphics devices and hardware, so that applications written to use GKS will be readily portable to many platforms and devices.

GKS was fairly common on computer workstations in the 1980s and early 1990s. GKS formed the basis of Digital Research's GSX which evolved into VDI, one of the core components of GEM. GEM was the native GUI on the Atari ST and was occasionally seen on PCs, particularly in conjunction with Ventura Publisher. GKS was little used commercially outside these markets, but remains in use in some scientific visualization packages. It is also the underlying API defining the Computer Graphics Metafile. One popular application based on an implementation of GKS is the GR Framework, a C library for high-performance scientific visualization that has become a common plotting backend among Julia users.

A main developer and promoter of the GKS was José Luis Encarnação, formerly director of the Fraunhofer Institute for Computer Graphics (IGD) in Darmstadt, Germany.

GKS has been standardized in the following documents:

- ANSI standard ANSI X3.124 of 1985.
- ISO 7942:1985 standard, revised as ISO 7942:1985/Amd 1:1991 and ISO/IEC 7942-1:1994, as well as ISO/IEC 7942-2:1997, ISO/IEC 7942-3:1999 and ISO/IEC 7942-4:1998
- The language bindings are ISO standard ISO 8651.
- GKS-3D (Graphical Kernel System for Three Dimensions) functional definition is ISO standard ISO 8805, and the corresponding C bindings are ISO/IEC 8806.

The functionality of GKS is wrapped up as a data model standard in the STEP standard, section ISO 10303-46.

== See also ==
- General Graphics Interface
- GSS-KERNEL
- IGES (Initial Graphics Exchange Specification)
- NAPLPS
