= Hans Piloty =

Rector of the Technical University of Munich
- In office 1948–1951
- Preceded by: Ludwig Föppl
- Succeeded by: August Rucker

Personal details
- Born: 1 November 1894 Berlin, German Empire
- Died: 12 August 1969 (aged 74) Wildbad Kreuth, Germany
- Children: Robert Piloty
- Education: Technical University of Munich
- Scientific career
- Thesis: Die allgemeine Spannungs-Regulierungsproblem in Wechselstrom-Versorgungsnetzen (1923)
- Doctoral advisor: Leo Kadrnozka
- Doctoral students: Peter Lockemann; Fritz Borgnis

Hans Piloty (November 1, 1894 – August 12, 1969) was a German electrical engineer and communications engineer.

== Life ==
Hans Jakob Piloty descended from an upper middle-class Munich family of artists and scholars. He began studying electrical engineering at the TH Munich in 1913. After voluntary service in World War I, he obtained his diploma in 1921 and finished his doctoral studies in 1923 under the supervision of Leo Kadrnozka. From 1925, he was a senior engineer at AEG Berlin. In the power plant department he worked on problems of energy transmission. In 1931 he was appointed to the chair of electrical measurement technology at the TH Munich.

After World War II, he worked for a few months at Fort Monmouth in 1947, but quickly returned to Munich to his institute. From 1948 to 1951 he was Rector of the TH Munich. He retired in 1962.
