= Erhard Rahm =

German computer scientist (born 1959)

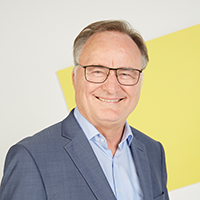
- Born: April 24, 1959 (age 67); Heiligenmoschel, West Germany
- Citizenship: German
- Education: University of Kaiserslautern
- Known for: Research on database systems, data integration, and data quality
- Awards: VLDB 10-Year Best Paper Award (2011) ICDE Influential Paper Award (2013)
- Scientific career
- Fields: Computer science, database systems, data integration, big data
- Workplaces: Leipzig University; University of Kaiserslautern; IBM Thomas J. Watson Research Center
- Thesis: Synchronisation in Mehrrechner-Datenbank-Systemen: Konzepte, Realisierungsformen und quantitative Bewertung (1988)
- Doctoral advisor: Theo Härder

Erhard Rahm (born 1959) is a German computer scientist and professor at the University of Leipzig. His research areas are database systems, data integration and Big Data.

== Biography ==
Rahm studied computer science at Kaiserslautern University of Technology from 1979 to 1984 where he also earned his Ph.D. in 1988. From 1988 to 1989 he was a post-doc at the IBM Thomas J. Watson Research Center in Hawthorne. He was an assistant professor at Kaiserslautern University of Technology from 1989 to 1994 and received the Venia legendi in 1993. Since 1994 he is a full professor for databases at the University of Leipzig. He spent extended research visits at Microsoft Research in Redmond (WA) and the Australian National University.

He has been founding director of the German Big Data competence center ScaDS and the German center of artificial intelligence ScaDS.AI Dresden/Leipzig from Oct. 2014 until Sep. 2025.

He served two terms as elected vice president of the German Informatics Society (2021-2025). In 2003, Rahm served as General Chair of the 10th BTW Conference (Database Systems for Business, Technology and the Web), held in Leipzig.

== Publications ==
Rahm has published 5 textbooks and over 350 co-authored and peer-reviewed publications. According to Google Scholar, as of August 2026, he has an H-index of 71.

In 2004, he established the international conference series "Data integration in the Life Sciences (DILS)" which run until 2018.

Key publications include:

- Zohra, Bellahsene; Angela, Bonifati; Erhard, Rahm (2011), Schema Matching and Mapping, Springer, Bibcode:2011smm..book.....B, doi:10.1007/978-3-642-16518-4, ISBN 978-3-642-16517-7.
- Rahm, Erhard; Hong Hai, Do (2000), "Data Cleaning: Problems and Current Approaches", IEEE Data Engineering Bulletin, 23 (4): 3–13.
- Rahm, Erhard; Bernstein, Philip A. (2001). "A survey of approaches to automatic schema matching". The VLDB Journal. 10 (4): 334–350. doi:10.1007/s007780100057.
- Rahm, Erhard (March 2004). Data Integration in the Life Sciences, First International Workshop, DILS 2004, Leipzig, Germany, March 25-26, 2004, Proceedings. Leipzig, Germany: Springer. ISBN 3-540-21300-7.
- Hofer, Marvin; Obraczka, Daniel; Saeedi, Alieh; Köpcke, Hanna; Rahm, Erhard (2024). "Construction of Knowledge Graphs: Current State and Challenges". Information. 15 (8). arXiv:2302.11509. doi:10.3390/info15080509.

== Selected awards ==
- VLDB 10-Year Best Paper Award 2011 with Jayant Madhavan and Phil Bernstein,
- ICDE Influential Paper Award 2013 with Sergey Melnik and Hector Garcia-Molina
- Microsoft Research Outstanding Collaborator Award 2016
- GI Fellow of the German Informatics Society, 2026
