= Hans-Jürgen Appelrath =

German computer scientist

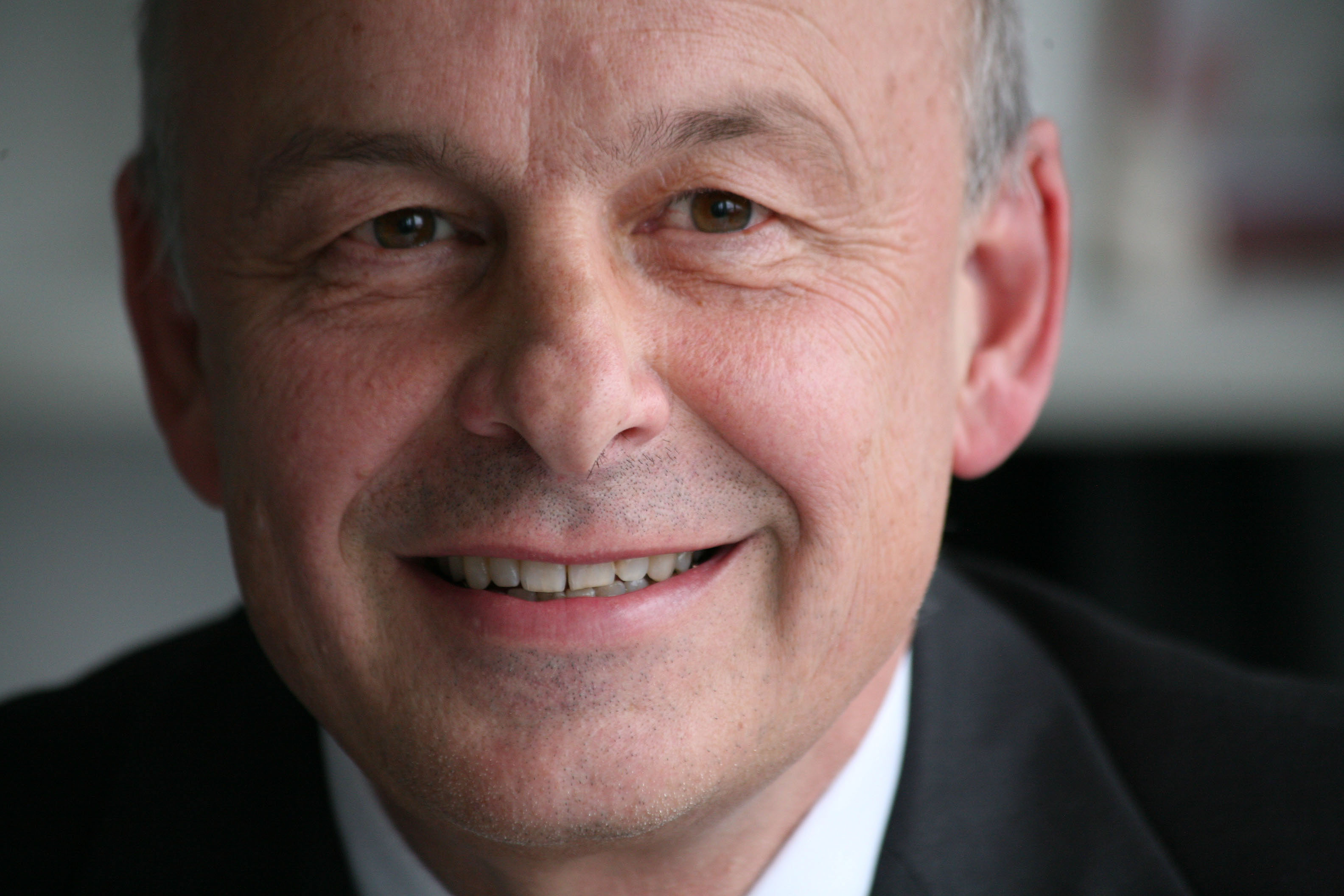
Hans-Jürgen Appelrath

Hans-Jürgen Appelrath (7 February 1952 – 5 August 2016) was a professor of computer science and information technology (IT) at the University of Oldenburg from 1987.

== Early career ==
After graduating from high school in Duisburg in June 1970, Appelrath studied mathematics and philosophy at the University of Bonn from 1970 to 1972. He then enrolled in the diploma course (old German Diplom) in computer science with minor in mathematics at the University of Dortmund, which he successfully completed in March 1977. From 1977 to 1983, he was a research associate of the Department of Computer Science at the University of Dortmund in various industrial collaboration projects. In May 1983, Appelrath was awarded his PhD by the University of Dortmund.

From 1984 to 1986, Appelrath was senior lecturer and research group leader at the Department of Computer Science of the ETH Zurich, where he was appointed as assistant professor of computer science in 1986. Between 1986 and 2001, he declined offers of professorship by the universities of Augsburg, Koblenz, Münster and Innsbruck.

Since 1987, Appelrath was a professor of computer science and IT at the University of Oldenburg, and, since 1991, a board member of the IT institute, Offis. From June 1992 to June 2005, he served as Chairman of Offis institute. From 2009 to 2010, he was Vice President for Research at the University of Oldenburg, and from June 2014 acting Vice President.

== Later career ==
Appelrath was the author and publisher of numerous textbooks and publications. He was responsible for many, extensive third-party projects at the University of Oldenburg and its affiliated institute OFFIS, which employs about 280 academic staff.

He was a member of the German Academy of Science and Engineering (acatech). He also sat on the Advisory Board of Institute of Computer Science at University of Zurich and Computer Science Technology Center (TZI) at University of Bremen.

In addition, Appelrath was a member of supervisory boards of several companies and chairman of the Association of Cooperative Education in IT and Business, Oldenburg. (Berufsakademie für IT und Wirtschaft Oldenburg)

== Awards ==
- 2004: Fellow of the German Society for Computer Science (Gesellschaft für Informatik)
- 2005: "Bull of Oldenburg" award given by the city of Oldenburg for extraordinary achievements in science, industry and major contributor to the city's economy.
- 2005: Lower Saxony Order of Merit
- 2007: Honorary Doctor of Carl Friedrich Gauss Faculty of Technical University of Braunschweig
