= Alfons Kemper =

German computer scientist

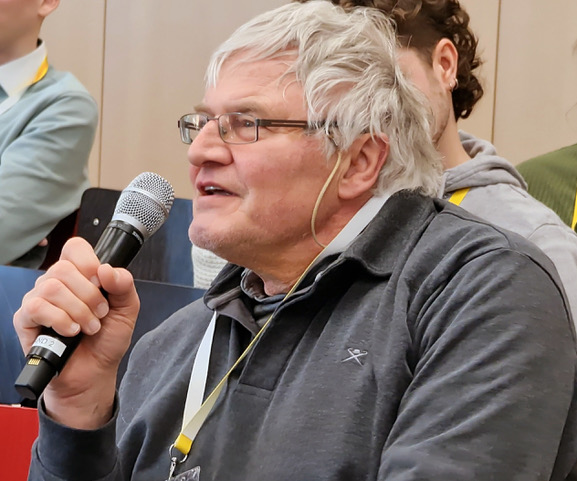
- Kemper at BTW 2025
- Born: 1958 (age 67–68)
- Education: University of Southern California, Technical University of Dortmund
- Known for: Object-oriented databases, in-memory databases
- Awards: ACM Fellow (2022)
- Scientific career
- Workplaces: Technical University of Munich, University of Karlsruhe (TH), RWTH Aachen University, University of Passau
- Thesis: Programming Language Constructs for Data-Intensive Application Development (1984)
- Doctoral advisor: Ellis Horowitz

Alfons Kemper (born 1958) is a German computer scientist and a full professor for database systems at the Technical University of Munich.

== Education and career ==
Kemper studied computer science at the Technical University of Dortmund from 1977 to 1981 (Vordiplom) and the University of Southern California in Los Angeles (Master of Science) and finished his PhD in computer science in 1984 under the supervision of Ellis Horowitz. From 1984 to 1991 he worked with Peter Lockemann at the University of Karlsruhe (TH) and habilitated there. In 1991, he became associate professor at the Chair of Computer Science III at RWTH Aachen University, and two years later he joined the University of Passau as a full professor. There, Kemper was dean of the Faculty of Mathematics and Computer Science from October 2001 to October 2003. Since 2004, he is leading the database group at the Technical University of Munich (TUM) as successor of Rudolf Bayer. The group is involved in the Bavarian elite study program in software engineering. Kemper was dean of the Faculty of Informatics from winter term 2006 to summer term 2010 and Head of Computer Science of the newly founded School of Computation, Information and Technology from October 2022. From November 2010 to March 2017, Kemper was spokesperson for the database systems division of the German Informatics Society (GI) and was appointed fellow of the GI in 2015.

== Research ==
For a time, Kemper's research was focusing on object-oriented databases. Meanwhile, main memory database systems are the focus of his research. Together with Thomas Neumann, he designed the main memory database system HyPer, which was sold to Tableau Software in 2016, and is working on its successor system Umbra.

== Awards ==
- 2025 VLDB Test of Time Award
- 2022 ACM Fellow
- 2021 ICDE Ten-Year Influential Paper Award

== Books ==
- with Eickler: Datenbanksysteme - Eine Einführung. De Gruyter (tenth edition), 2015
- with Wimmer: Übungsbuch Datenbanksysteme. Oldenbourg (third edition), 2011
