= José Luis Encarnação =

Portuguese university teacher

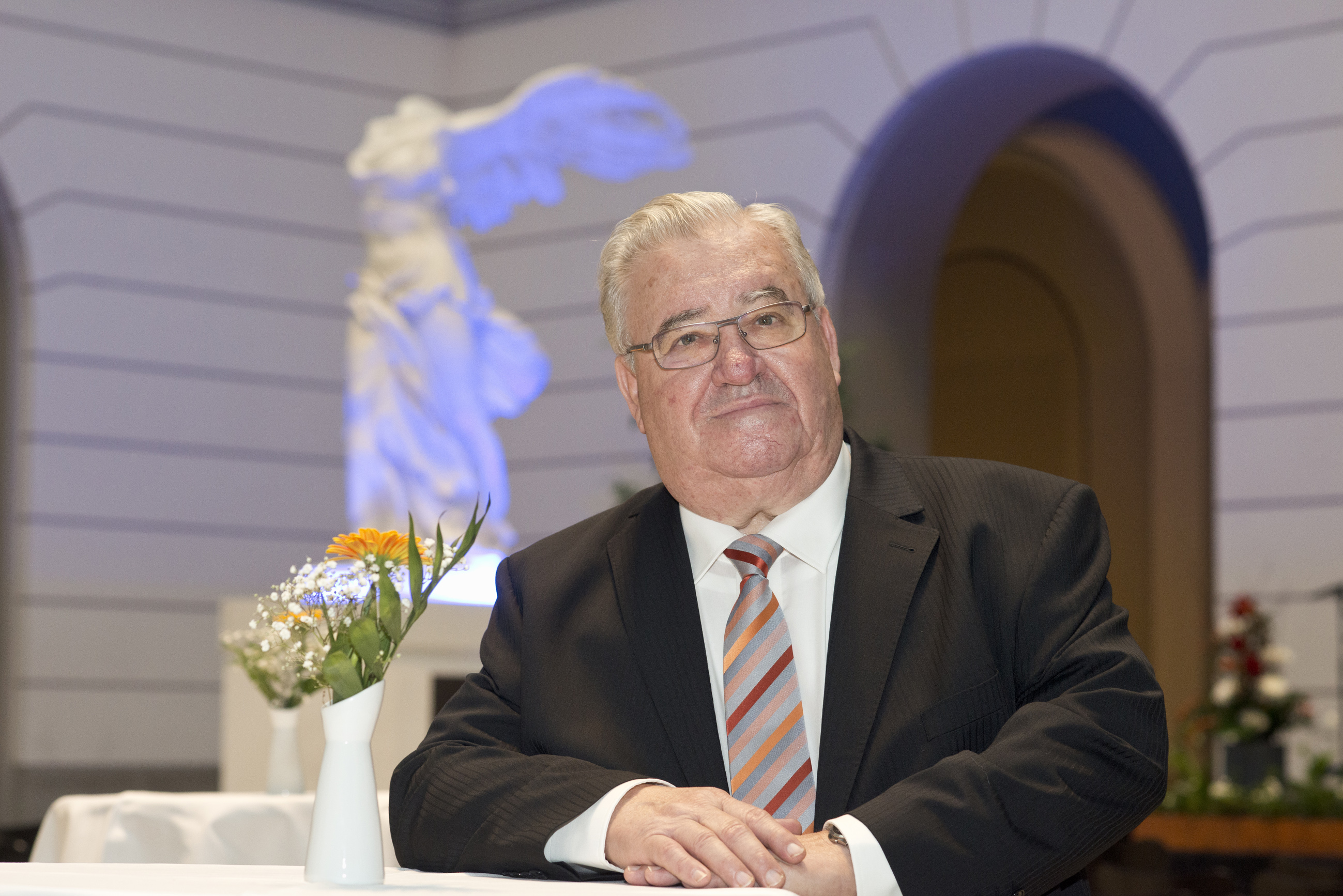
- José Luis Encarnaçāo, November 2014, Berlin, Germany
- Born: May 30, 1941 (age 85); São Domingos de Rana, Cascais, Portugal
- Citizenship: Portugal
- Education: Technische Universität Berlin
- Known for: Computer graphics, Graphical Kernel System
- Awards: ACM Fellow, Eurographics Fellow and Honorary Fellow, acatech Member, Berlin-Brandenburg Academy of Sciences and Humanities Member, ACM SIGGRAPH Steven A. Coons Award, GI Konrad Zuse Medal, Eurographics Gold Medal, TU Darmstadt Robert Piloty Prize, Lisbon Academy of Sciences Honorary Member
- Scientific career
- Fields: Computer graphics, Human-computer interaction, Computer-Aided Design
- Workplaces: Heinrich Hertz Institute (HHI), Universität des Saarlandes, Technische Universität Darmstadt, Fraunhofer IGD
- Doctoral students: Peter Baumann, Marc Alexa

José Luis Moreira da Encarnação is a Portuguese computer scientist, Professor Emeritus at the Department of Computer Science of the Technische Universität Darmstadt in Germany and a senior technology and innovation advisor to governments, multinational companies, research institutions and organizations, and foundations. He is involved in the development of research agendas and innovation strategies for socio-economic development with a focus on emerging economies. He is also a member of the German National Academy of Science and Engineering (acatech) and the German Berlin-Brandenburg Academy of Sciences and Humanities (BBAW). He is an elected member of the ACM SIGGRAPH Academy (USA) and an elected honorary member of the Lisbon Academy of Sciences (Portugal).

== Biography ==
Professor Encarnação was born in Portugal and has lived in the Federal Republic of Germany since 1959. In Portugal, he graduated from the Escola Salesiana do Estoril.

He holds a Diploma (Dipl.-Ing.) and a doctorate (Dr.-Ing.) in electrical engineering from the Technische Universität Berlin (TUB), where he conducted his Ph.D. studies with a scholarship of the Gulbenkian Foundation.

=== Academic career ===
In 1967, Professor Encarnação started his academic career in Computer Graphics at the Technische Universität Berlin (TUB) and at the Heinrich-Hertz-Institute in Berlin. Subsequently, he held research and academic positions at the Heinrich-Hertz-Institute in Berlin (1968-1972) and at the Universität des Saarlandes (1972 – 1975).

From 1975 to 2009 he was a full professor of Computer Science at the Technische Universität Darmstadt (TU Darmstadt), Germany, and the head of its Interactive Graphics Research Group (TUD–GRIS). Since October 2009 he is Professor Emeritus of the TU Darmstadt.

In 1977, he and his research group introduced the Graphical Kernel System (GKS) as the first ISO standard for low-level computer graphics.

Professor Encarnação is author or co-author of more than 500 publications in reviewed international journals and conferences and was the responsible advisor or co-advisor of more than 200 doctoral theses in Computer Graphics and related areas.

=== Professional career ===
From 1983 to 2007, Encarnação was Editor-in-Chief of the Computers & Graphics Journal (Elsevier).

From 1987 to 2006, he was the founding director of the Fraunhofer Institute for Computer Graphics (IGD) in Darmstadt, Germany.

From 1995 to 2001 he was an elected member of the Senate of the Fraunhofer Society (FhG) in Munich and from 2002 to 2006 he was a member of the Advisory Board (Präsidium) of the Gesellschaft für Informatik (GI).

From July 2001 to October 2006 he was the chairman of the Fraunhofer ICT (Information and Communication Technology) Group.

From 2001 to 2007 Professor Encarnação was a member of the EU-Advisory Board (ISTAG) for the EU 6th and 7th Framework Programme for the ICT area. He was chairman of this board from 2002 to 2004 and its vice-chairman from 2005 to 2007.

From 2017 to 2023 he was the chairman of the International Assessment and Evaluation Board nominated by the Portuguese Foundation for Science and Technology (FCT) to build up the Collaborative Laboratories (Co-Labs) in Portugal.

=== Founding and start-up achievements ===
In 1980, Professor Encarnação was one of the founders of Eurographics, the European Association for Computer Graphics, from 1980 to 1984 its first chairman and from 1985 to 1991 the chairman of its Professional Board.

Professor Encarnação founded the Fraunhofer IGD in 1986 and several Start-Ups between 1975 and 2009.

In 1999 he founded the INI-GraphicsNet, an International Network of Institutions for R&D and Applications in Computer Graphics, which is today a network of legally independent but closely cooperating research entities in Germany, Italy, Panama, Portugal and Spain. Since 2010 this network is operating under the new name GraphicsMedia.net GmbH.

== Notable awards and recognitions ==
Professor Encarnação is a Fellow of the Association for Computing Machinery since 1996, a Fellow of Eurographics as well as Honorary Fellow of Eurographics since 2006.

In 2001 he was elected full academy member of the Berlin-Brandenburg Academy of Sciences and Humanities BBAW in Germany and in 2002 he became a full academy member of the German Academy of Science and Technology acatech. In 2017 he was awarded with an honorary membership of the German "Gesellschaft für Forschungstransfer" (GFFT).

In August 2018 he was elected a member of the ACM SIGGRAPH Academy (USA).

On June 17, 2025 the Lisbon Academy of Sciences in Portugal elected him an honorary member of their academy.

=== National and Federal awards ===
Professor Encarnação received several Order of Merit of the Federal Republic of Germany decorations:

- the Cross in 1983,
- the Officer's Cross in 1995, and
- the Grand Cross in 2006.

The German Federal State of Hesse awarded to him the Hessian Culture Prize in 2000

The country of Portugal decorated him with the Order of Saint James of the Sword in 2001.

In honor of Professor Encarnação's achievements in the area of Computer Graphics, the Eurographics Portuguese Chapter established in 2010 the annual Professor José Luís Encarnação Award for student achievement in academic publication in the area of Computer Graphics.

=== Honorary appointments ===
In recognition of his technical and scientific achievements he received several honorary doctorates (Dr.h.c. and Dr.E.h.)

- from the Universidade Técnica de Lisboa in Lisbon, Portugal, in 1991,
- from the Universität Rostock, Germany, in 1996,
- from the Universidade do Minho, Portugal, in 2002,
- from the Nanyang Technological University in Singapore, in 2008, and
- from the Technische Universität Berlin, Germany, in 2014

as well as honorary professorships

- from Instituto Superior Técnico in Lisbon, Portugal, in 1990,
- from Zhejiang University in Hangzhou, China, in 1991, and
- from the State University of Campinas (UNICAMP) in São Paulo, Brazil, in 2001,

and an honorary senatorship from the University of Maribor, Slowenia, in 2002.

=== Professional, academic, and cultural awards ===
For his professional, technical and scientific achievements and his impact in science and industry he received internationally recognized professional awards, including

- the Karl-Heinz-Beckurts Award in 1989,
- the Steven A. Coons Award from ACM SIGGRAPH (USA) in 1995,
- the Konrad Zuse Medal by the German Computer Society (Gesellschaft für Informatik) in 1997,
- the Fraunhofer Medal from the Fraunhofer Society in 2001,
- the Technology Award of the Eduard Rhein Foundation in 2001,
- the Convergators Award for Lifetime Achievement by BiTKOM and FOCUS during CeBIT
- the Golden Honorary Medal of the Universität Rostock in 2012,
- the first Eurographics Gold Medal of the Eurographics Association in 2016,
- an inaugural ACM SIGGRAPH Academy award in 2018, which made him an elected member of the ACM SIGGRAPH Academy, and
- the 2022 Robert Piloty Prize of Technische Universität Darmstadt for scientific achievements in the field of computer engineering.
