= Phil Bernstein =

American computer scientist

Philip A. Bernstein
- Education: University of Toronto
- Scientific career
- Fields: Computer science
- Workplaces: Microsoft Research
- Doctoral advisor: Dennis Tsichritzis

Philip A. Bernstein is a computer scientist specializing in database research in the Database Group of Microsoft Research. Bernstein is also an affiliate professor at the University of Washington and frequent committee member or chair of conferences such as VLDB and SIGMOD. He won the SIGMOD Edgar F. Codd Innovations Award in 1994, and in 2011 with Jayant Madhavan and Erhard Rahm the VLDB 10 Year Best Paper Award for their VLDB 2001 paper "Generic Schema Matching with Cupid".

Bernstein was elected a member of the National Academy of Engineering for contributions to transaction-processing and database systems. He is also an elected Fellow of the Association for Computing Machinery. He is a charter member of the Washington State Academy of Sciences (2008) and served on their board of directors from 2012 to 2018.
