= Konrad Zuse Medal =

The Konrad Zuse Medal for Services to Computer Science is the highest award of the Gesellschaft für Informatik (German Computer Science Society), given every two years to one or sometimes two leading German computer scientists. It is named after German computer pioneer Konrad Zuse. Note that a different medal with the same name is also given out by the Zentralverband des Deutschen Baugewerbes (Central Association of German Construction).

== Recipients ==
Source: Gesellschaft für Informatik

- 1987: Heinz Billing
- 1989: Nikolaus Joachim Lehmann
- 1989: Robert Piloty
- 1991: Wilhelm Kämmerer
- 1993: Carl Adam Petri
- 1995: Kurt Mehlhorn
- 1997: José Luis Encarnação
- 1999: Günter Hotz
- 2001: Theo Härder
- 2003: Thomas Lengauer
- 2006: Ingo Wegener
- 2007: Manfred Broy
- 2009: Reinhard Wilhelm
- 2011: Fritz-Rudolf Güntsch
- 2011: Volker Strassen
- 2013: Markus Gross
- 2015: Arndt Bode
- 2017: Johannes Buchmann
- 2019: Dorothea Wagner
- 2021: Gerhard Weikum
- 2023: Anja Feldmann
- 2024: Thomas Liebich, André Borrmann

== See also ==
- List of computer science awards
- List of prizes named after people
