= Leo Kadrnozka =

- Born: June 6, 1872; Teschen, Austria
- Died: 17 September 1922 (aged 50); Großvenediger, Austria
- Education: Technical University of Vienna
- Scientific career
- Fields: Electrical engineering
- Workplaces: Technical University of Munich
- Thesis: (1896)
- Doctoral advisor: Johann von Radinger; Leopold von Hauffe
- Doctoral students: Hans Piloty

Leo Kadrnozka (June 6, 1872 – September 17, 1922) was a full professor of Electrical Railways and Electrical Switching and Regulating Apparatus at the Technical University of Munich.

== Life ==
Kadrnozka studied mechanical engineering at the Technical University of Vienna from 1892 to 1896 under the supervision of Leopold von Hauffe and Johann von Radinger. In 1896/1897 he worked there as an assistant.

He then worked for the Imperial Royal Austrian State Railways, and from 1898 for the Vienna railway department of Siemens & Halske. There he was involved in the construction of the tramways in Vienna, Budapest, Sarajevo, Salzburg, Olmütz, Dornbirn-Lustenau and the Badner Bahn. In 1907 he moved to AEG Vienna as chief engineer.

In 1907 he accepted a lectureship as honorary professor for Electrical Railways and Electrical Switching and Regulating Apparatus at the Technical University of Munich, and from 1909 he was appointed full professor of electrical engineering. In Munich he supervised the dissertations of Udo Knorr, Hans Piloty and Louis Stokvis.

The passionate mountaineer Kadrnozka died in 1922 while climbing the Großvenediger when he fell into a crevasse.
