= Klaus Dittrich =

German computer scientist

Klaus R. Dittrich
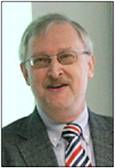
- Born: December 30, 1950; Münchberg, Oberfranken, West Germany
- Died: November 20, 2007 (aged 56)
- Citizenship: German
- Education: University of Karlsruhe (TH)
- Scientific career
- Fields: Computer Science
- Workplaces: Universität Zürich
- Thesis: Ein universelles Konzept zum flexiblen Informationsschutz in und mit Rechensystemen (1983)
- Doctoral advisor: Peter Lockemann

Klaus R. Dittrich (30 December 1950 – 20 November 2007) was a German computer scientist.

== Biography ==
After his high school graduation at Gymnasium Münchberg he studied at University of Karlsruhe where he received his diploma degree (M.Sc.) in Computer Science.

1982 he earned his Ph.D. at the University of Karlsruhe, Institute for Program Structures and Data Organization. He was heading the database department Research Center for Information Technologies at University of Karlsruhe from 1985 to 1989.

Since 1989 he has been a professor of Computer Science at the University of Zurich and head of the Database Technology Research Group.

Klaus R. Dittrich took sabbatical leaves at Stanford University and Hewlett Packard Labs (1996), at Università degli Studi di Milano and at Boeing (2002). 1999 he was guest professor at Aalborg University.
