= Brandis, Germany =

Brandis
- Town
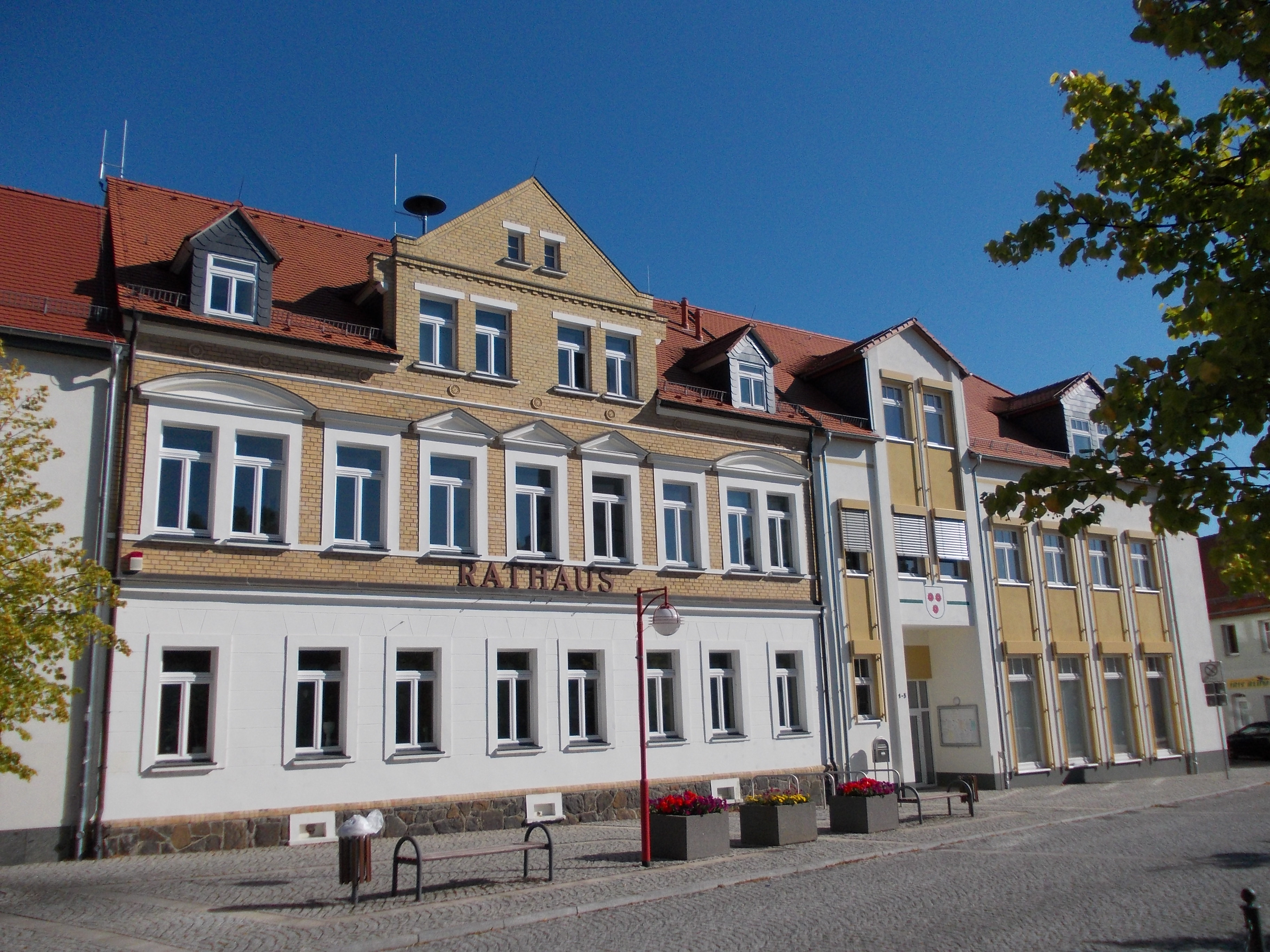

- Coat of arms

- Location of Brandis within Leipzig district
- Interactive map of Brandis
- Location within Germany Location within Saxony
- Coordinates: 51°20′5″N 12°36′32″E
- Country: Germany
- State: Saxony
- District: Leipzig
- Subdivisions: 4

Government
  - Mayor (2020–27): Arno Jesse (Ind.)

Area
  - Total: 34.89 km^{2} (13.47 sq mi)
- Elevation: 137 m (449 ft)

Population (2025-12-31)
  - Total: 9,634
  - Density: 276.1/km^{2} (715.2/sq mi)
- Time zone: UTC+01:00 (CET)
  - Summer (DST): UTC+02:00 (CEST)
- Postal codes: 04821
- Dialling codes: 034292
- Vehicle registration: L, BNA, GHA, GRM, MTL, WUR
- Website: www.stadt-brandis.de

Brandis (German pronunciation: [ˈbʁandɪs]) is a town in the Leipzig district, in Saxony, Germany. It is situated 16 km east of Leipzig.

== Geography ==
Brandis developed as a village around Brandis manor house which still forms part of the historical center. Since the late 1990s, the city has been merged with a number of formerly independent villages, including Beucha and Polenz.

== Transport ==
Brandis is connected to the federal highway network via a network of local roads. In Beucha, the city is linked to the regional rail network with direct trains to Leipzig.

== Born in Brandis ==
- Karl Bock (1922-2004), physician in the field of pediatric cardiology
- Anneliese Zänsler (born 1927), opera and operetta singer, vocal pedagogue and musicologist
- Andreas Reuter (born 1949), computer scientist
- Stefan Altner (born 1956), musicologist
