= Thomas Neumann =

German computer scientist (born 1977)

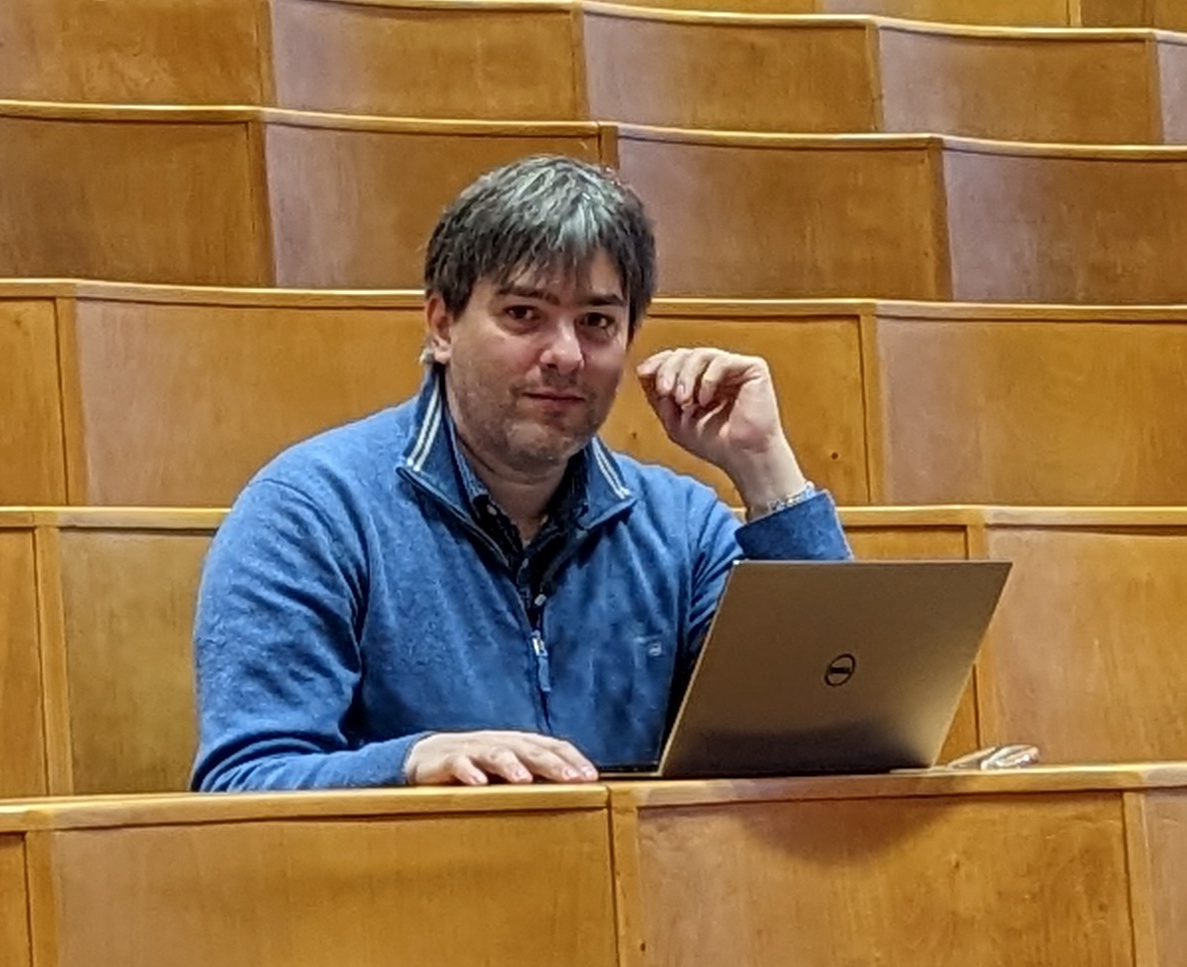
- Neumann in 2023
- Born: 1977 (age 48–49)
- Education: University of Mannheim
- Known for: RDF-3X in-memory databases
- Awards: Leibniz Prize
- Scientific career
- Fields: Computer science
- Workplaces: Technical University of Munich; Saarland University
- Thesis: Efficient generation and execution of DAG-structured query graphs (2005)
- Doctoral advisor: Guido Moerkotte

Thomas Neumann (born 1977) is a German computer scientist and full professor for Data Science and Engineering at the Technical University of Munich (TUM).

== Education and career ==
Thomas Neumann finished his studies in business informatics, at the University of Mannheim in 2001. He received his doctor's degree in computer science under the supervision of Guido Moerkotte, in 2005, and then worked as a senior researcher at the Max Planck Institute for Computer Science in Saarbrücken, with Gerhard Weikum. During this time, Neumann developed RDF-3X, a system for graph databases. He habilitated in 2010 at Saarland University. In the same year, he joined the group for database systems at TUM under Alfons Kemper as associate professor. In 2017, he became a full professor for Data Science and Engineering, also at TUM.

== Research ==
His research areas are query optimisation and efficient query processing by just-in-time compilation. As part of this research, he developed the main memory database system HyPer, which was sold to Tableau Software in 2016, and its successor system Umbra. He was awarded the Gottfried Wilhelm Leibniz Prize by the German Research Foundation for his work on HyPer.

== Awards ==
- 2025 VLDB Test of Time Award
- 2025 VLDB Best Paper Award
- 2021 VLDB Test of Time Award
- 2021 ICDE Ten-Year Influential Paper Award
- 2020 Gottfried Wilhelm Leibniz Prize
- 2016 ERC Consolidator Grant
- 2014 Early Career Award of the VLDB Conference
- 1994 International Olympiad in Informatics gold medal
