= Ludwig Föppl =

German mechanical engineer (1887–1976)

- Föppl on the western front during World War I
- Born: 27 February 1887; Berlin, German Empire
- Died: 13 May 1976 (aged 89); Münster, West Germany
- Education: University of Göttingen
- Scientific career
- Fields: Mathematics; Engineering; Cryptology
- Thesis: Stabile Anordnungen von Elektronen im Atom (1912)
- Doctoral advisor: David Hilbert
- Doctoral students: Harald Ludvig Westergaard

Rector of the Technical University of Munich
- In office 1947–1948
- Preceded by: Robert Vorhoelzer
- Succeeded by: Hans Piloty

Karl Ludwig Föppl (27 February 1887 – 13 May 1976) was a German mechanical engineer who succeeded his father, August Föppl as professor of technical mechanics at the Technical University of Munich. During World War I, Föppl worked as a cryptanalyst, initially in Inspectorate 7/VI, and later in the war within General der Nachrichtenaufklärung.

By 1940, he was a full member of the Bavarian Academy of Sciences. Föppl was one of the earliest cryptoanalysts in the German Army, working at this profession during both the first and second world wars, eventually becoming Chief of Sixth Army's Evaluation Office. His work was kept secret from both his family and his colleagues, even his later university assistant Friedrich L. Bauer, who would also become a well known cryptologist in his own right, never knew. In 2005, the work of Hilmar-Detlef Brückner of the Bavarian State Archive (German: Bayerisches Hauptstaatsarchiv) brought this aspect of Föppl's career to prominence. Brückner's work was subsequently fleshed out from information contained in Föppl's unpublished autobiography, still retained by his family, several chapters of which provided details of his work during the two world wars.

== Life ==
Föppl was the son of August Föppl, a German structuralist and university lecturer. His brother was Otto Föppl who was an engineer and Professor of Applied Mechanics at the Technical University of Braunschweig for 30 years. His brother-in-law was the physicist Ludwig Prandtl. Föppl completed his Abitur in 1906 and studied mechanical engineering for two years at the Polytechnical Institute. He then spent a year at the University of Göttingen studying the theoretical aspects of engineering. He was promoted in 1912 to Dr Phil in mathematics, with a thesis titled Stable arrangements of electrons in the atom (German: Stabile Anordnungen von Elektronen im Atom). He worked as an assistant to Felix Klein, a leading mathematician on Group theory, complex analysis and non-Euclidean geometry. In March 1914, Föppl habilitated in mathematics. He started teaching as a Privatdozent at the Physics Institute at the University of Würzburg, working with Wilhelm Wien. From 1925 to 1955 he was Director of the Mechanical-Technical Laboratory of the Technical University of Munich.

In July 1918, Föppl became engaged to Friederike Pühn.

== Military life ==
=== World War I ===
At the beginning of World War I, Föppl was keen to enlist and experience life at the front as part of the infantry, but found the process less than straightforward due to the high number of other volunteers enlisting. Peter Vogel, who taught mathematics at the Munich War Academy (German: Bayerische Kriegsakademie), suggested that Föppl would be more likely to be able to serve if he volunteered to join the wireless telegraphy service, and provided a contact for a colonel in the Ministry of War. Föppl was successful in enlisting in the Wireless Telegraphy Replacement Company.

After finishing his basic training, Föppl was posted to Roubaix, arriving on 15 December 1914. The unit's remit was to intercept wireless communications of the British Expeditionary Force and the ships of the Royal Navy in the English Channel. However, Föppl ended up working as a kitchen boy, as he was unable to transcribe nonencrypted messages due to his lack of French. By early 1915, there were thousands of encrypted messages, which were believed by the German Army and German Navy to be unusable. Föppl sought permission to attempt to decipher them during his spare time.

Föppl began by determining which messages had been encrypted using the same key; this was accomplished by looking for common sequences of characters. These messages were structured and transmitted in sets of five letters, transcribed on square paper, and each message was represented as a series of columns of letters. As an emergent property of this transcribing method, standard sequences of characters stood out readily. Foppl focused on groups of four or more characters. When a sequence appeared more than once in a message, or in several messages, he indicated that it was enciphered with the same key. Having sorted all the messages into groups, he focused on the group which seemed easiest to analyse as it contained the largest number of messages and the most repetitions of common sequences. He used frequency analysis against the message, then compared it against the equivalent statistics for a plaintext English document. He was able to instantly determine the key. Since this key was still in use, the Roubaix station was able to start reading incoming messages that were encrypted with that key. The news of the deciphering spread rapidly through the German Navy. The majority of the decrypts were related to British minesweeping operations in the English Channel.

The key that Föppl discovered was termed a Caesar and the cipher was a variant of the Gronsfeld cipher. Föppl suggested it was used as it enabled the cipher clerk to encrypt messages very quickly and could be easily enciphered by ordinary sailors, with a key that was changed every few weeks, that could be broken within a single day.

During this period Föppl read the lengthy daily telegrams sent by Second Sea Lord George Egerton and managed to break the cipher, known as the Allied Fleet Code that was long considered unbreakable by the German Navy, and was considered thus to be a new source of intelligence which was of the greatest importance. From July 1915, daily reports compiled by Foppl and Lieutenant Martin Braune, the director of marine intelligence (German Naval Intelligence Service), were now sent to senior staff. Vizeadmiral Hugo von Pohl stated:

They have proved to be a great help for our submarine and Zeppelin missions.

Föppl was promoted to sergeant (German: Vizwachtmeister) on 9 January 1916 and subsequently promoted to Lieutenant on 14 July 1916, which was subsequently converted into a full commissioned officer post in the regular army on the August 1918. His promotion enabled him to build a small team which included physicists Wilhelm Lenz and Hans Rau (physicist). Föppl found that due to his work, he was able to rescue academically gifted individuals from the front line, for use as cryptanalysts and evaluators, an idealised sentiment which was not always successfully achieved. The mathematician Richard Courant offered several suggestions to Föppl, including one individual whom he arranged to be transferred to the unit but he was killed in action before the transfer could be completed. By the end of World War I, Föppl was head of Sixth Army's Evaluation Office, located in Lille and then Tournai. Föppl was demobilized at the end of hostilities.

=== World War II ===
In March 1938, Föppl was reactivated and told to report to Army HQ after the Anschluss, where he was sent to Vienna to work at a German wireless company. Upon arrival, there was some confusion as to his purpose, since he was then in his mid 50s, with no modern uniform, and had spent the interwar period employed as an academic. He was ordered to visit the TU Wien, where he meet the Rector of the Institute and attended a meeting of the Senate to answer extensive questions from staff and academics about the Anschluss. After a week, he was demobilized and sent back to Munich.

On 25 August 1939, Föppl was again reactivated and requested (ordered) to Army HQ in Berlin for assignment, which put his whole family into a deep depression. Föppl was assigned an Evaluation Office working on the Invasion of Poland. He asked to be posted closer to his family and was eventually posted to western Army HQ in Frankfurt, working in a cryptanalysis role. He subsequently made a request to move back to work at the Technical University of Munich and was discharged on 20 January 1940, with his military career at an end. He spent the rest of the war continuing his research at the university, deliberately keeping a low profile.

== Academia ==
After the military service in World War I, Ludwig Föppl became professor of mechanics at the Technische Hochschule Dresden in 1920 and professor of mechanics at the Technische Hochschule Munich in 1922. The focus of his works was on theoretical continuum mechanics. Apart from this, Föppl has significantly developed the industrial measuring technique of photoelasticity in Germany. During the Second World War, he relocated his residence and photoelasticity laboratory to Ammerland, which may have saved his life, because his house in Munich was hit by an American bomb in an attack on July 12, 1944, and was completely destroyed. It was his photoelasticity laboratory, which gave him the possibility to continue working in the first years of the Second World War.

Föppl made an essential contribution to contact mechanics, even when this part of his work became acknowledged only in the last years. The key contribution is contained in his 8-page paper "Elastic stress in the ground under foundations" of 1941. In this paper, Föppl determined the deformation of the surface of an elastic half-space under the action of arbitrary plane as well as arbitrary axis-symmetric pressure distribution, in a form that allowed a simple inversion and thus solution of an arbitrary contact problem. This inversion was made in the dissertation of his doctoral student Gerhard Schubert, published in a shortened form in 1942.

== Bibliography ==
He was editor of the later editions of Vorlesungen über Technische Mechanik of his father August Föppl (with Otto Föppl) and co-author of Drang und Zwang.

- Ludwig, Föppl; Mönch, Ernst (1950). Praktische Spannungsoptik (in German) (3rd ed.). Berlin, Heidelberg: Springer-Verlag. doi:10.1007/978-3-642-52730-2. ISBN 978-3-642-52730-2. OCLC 597041714.
- Föppl, Ludwig (1959). "Elementare Mechanik vom höheren Standpunkt" [Elementary mechanics from the higher point of view]. Kwartalnik Historii Nauki i Techniki (in German). 6 (1). Munich.
- Föppl, Ludwig; Neuber, Heinz (1935). Festigkeitslehre mittels Spannungsoptik (in German) (Reprint 2019 ed.). Berlin: De Gruyter Oldenbourg. ISBN 978-3-486-76995-1. OCLC 1356576124.
- Föppl, Ludwig (1947). Die strenge Lösung für die rollende Reibung [The strict solution for rolling friction] (in German). Leibniz. OCLC 11226288.
- Föppl, Ludwig; Gerhard, Sunday (1951). "Tafeln und Tabellen zur Festigkeitslehre" [Tables and charts on strength of materials] (pamphlet). Betriebs-und marktwirtschaftliche Studien zur Ernährungswirtschaft (in German). Munich: Oldenbourg. OCLC 5734320.
- Föppl, Ludwig; August, Föppl. Drang und Zwang: Eine höhere Festigkeitslehre für Ingenieure. Drang und Zwang (in German). Vol. 3 (2019 Reprint ed.). Oldenbourg. doi:10.1515/9783486776751. ISBN 978-1-110-99348-2. OCLC 1110714143.

== Awards and honours ==
- Iron Cross, Second Class - 4 July 1915
- Iron Cross, First Class - 16 April 1916
- Military Merit Order, Fourth Class With Swords - 16 April 1916
- Military Merit Order, Third Class With Swords - 12 September 1916

== See also ==
- Bearing capacity
- Method of Dimensionality Reduction
- Triakis truncated tetrahedron
