= Theo Härder =

German computer scientist

- Born: 28 August 1945 (age 81); Bad Neustadt an der Saale
- Education: Technische Universität Darmstadt
- Occupation: Computer scientist
- Known for: Work on database, transaction processing systems and parallel and distributed computer systems
- Awards: Konrad Zuse Medal
- Scientific career
- Fields: Computer science
- Workplaces: Technische Universität Darmstadt; University of Kaiserslautern
- Thesis: Das Zugriffszeitverhalten von Relationalen Datenbanksystemen. (1974)
- Doctoral advisor: Hartmut Wedekind
- Doctoral students: Erhard Rahm

Theo Härder (born 28 August 1945 in Bad Neustadt an der Saale, Germany) is a Professor of Computer Science at the University of Kaiserslautern.

== Life and career ==
Theo Härder studied electrical Engineering at the Department of Electrical Engineering and Information Technology of the Technische Universität Darmstadt, earning his doctorate there in 1975. In 1976 he moved to the IBM Research - Almaden in San Jose, California. In 1977 he returned to TU Darmstadt as a professor at the Department of Computer Science. In 1980 he accepted an appointment at the University of Kaiserslautern in computer science.

== Accomplishments ==
Härder has received numerous awards for outstanding scientific achievements in the field of databases. He participated in the development of System R, the first relational database management system.

In 1983, he and Andreas Reuter coined the acronym ACID to describe the essential characteristics of a distributed relational database (Atomicity, Consistency, Isolation, and Durability).

== Awards ==
Konrad Zuse Medal, 2001 Honorary doctorate from Universität Oldenburg, 2002
