= August Föppl =

Professor of engineering

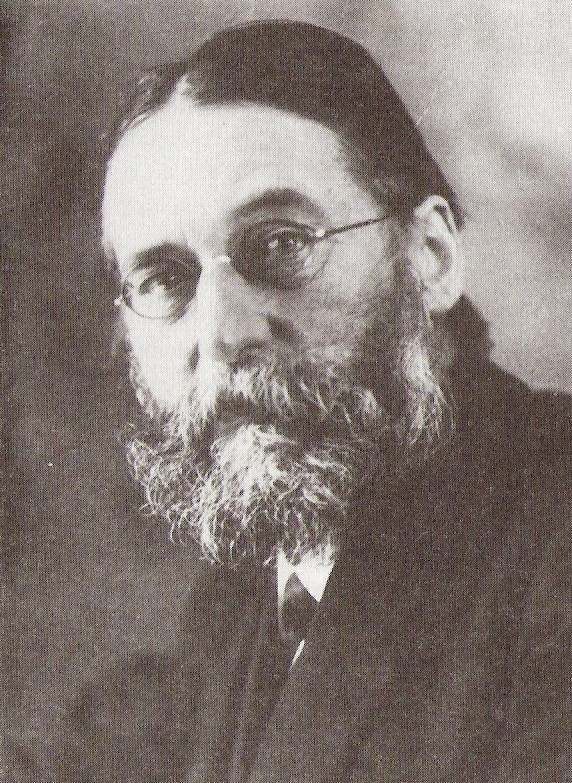
- August Föppl
- Born: 25 January 1854; Groß-Umstadt, Hesse
- Died: 12 October 1924 (aged 70); Ammerland
- Scientific career
- Fields: physics, engineering, mathematics
- Thesis: Theorie des Fachwerks (1880); Theorie der Gewölbe (1881) both monographs combined into 1886 dissertation Mathematische Theorie der Baukonstruktionen
- Doctoral advisor: Gustav Heinrich Wiedemann
- Doctoral students: Hermann Föttinger; Ludwig Prandtl

August Otto Föppl (25 January 1854 – 12 August 1924) was a professor of Technical Mechanics and Graphical Statics at the Technical University of Munich, Germany. He is credited with introducing the Föppl–Klammer theory and the Föppl–von Kármán equations (large deflection of elastic plates).

== Life ==
Föppl was born in Groß-Unstadt, Hesse where his father Carl August Föppl was a physician. He went to study engineering at Darmstadt Polytechnic in 1869 and then moved to Stuttgart where he studied under Otto Mohr. He then went to Karlsruhe. He then taught engineering at Holzminden from 1877 to 1892 while also studying physics at Leipzig University. His doctoral advisor was Gustav Heinrich Wiedemann and his thesis was on the strength of timber frames and arches. one of Föppl's first doctoral students was Ludwig Prandtl, his future son-in-law. He married Emilie Schenck (1856–1924) and they had two sons and three daughters. His daughter Gertrud married Prandtl. Son Ludwig Föppl became a mechanical engineer and Professor of Technical Mechanics at the Technical University of Munich. Otto Föppl became an engineer and Professor of Applied Mechanics at the Technical University of Braunschweig for 30 years.

== Career ==
In 1894, Föppl wrote a widely read introductory book on Maxwell's theory of electricity, titled Einführung in die Maxwellsche Theorie der Elektrizität. This 1894 book pioneered the use of Maxwell's theory in Germany and made Föppl famous as a scientist. Gerald Holton argues, that some arguments of Föppl concerning electromagnetic induction, had some influence on Albert Einstein's first paper on special relativity.

== See also ==
- Rotordynamics
