= Klaus Tschira Foundation =

German foundation

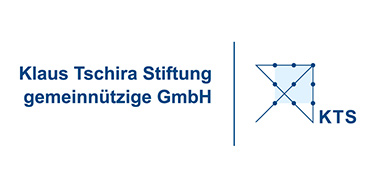

The Klaus Tschira Stiftung (KTS) is a German foundation established by the physicist Klaus Tschira in 1995 as a non-profit organization. Its primary objective is to support projects in the natural and computer sciences as well as mathematics. The KTS places strong emphasis on the public understanding in these fields. Klaus Tschira’s commitment to this objective was honored in 1999 with the "Deutscher Stifterpreis" by the German National Academic Foundation (German: Studienstiftung). The KTS is located at the Villa Bosch in Heidelberg, Germany, the former residence of Nobel Prize laureate for chemistry Carl Bosch (1874–1940).

== Activities ==
The foundation mainly initiates academic and non-profit, non-academic research projects in the natural sciences, computer sciences and mathematics. It supports teaching and research at public and private universities as well as projects involving children and young people.

Its main goal is to arouse public awareness for natural sciences, to engage in research for the benefit of society and to communicate science in an understandable format for non-scientists. Furthermore, upon application, the foundation supports projects in line with the mission of the foundation. The main goals of the organization have been set as:

- Education: Promoting fascination for science
- Research for the benefit of society
- Science Communication: Encouraging the dialogue between researchers and the public

In 2013, the Klaus Tschira Stiftung established the Heidelberg Laureate Forum Foundation (HLFF). The HLFF organizes the annual Heidelberg Laureate Forum, an event in Heidelberg, which gives a select group of young researchers the opportunity to meet pre-eminent scientists from the fields of mathematics and computer science.

== Science for young people ==
The foundation induces children and young people to be enthusiastic and curious about natural phenomena.

=== Forscherstation ===
Forscherstation is the name of the Klaus Tschira Competence Centre for Early Science Education. It seeks to instill kindergarten children and their educators with enthusiasm for the natural sciences. Children are encouraged to playfully explore natural phenomena from their immediate environment. The explorer station is a research facility of the college of education Heidelberg. It also investigates the effects of further training on the teacher’s development of competence and the children’s learning processes.

=== GIS-Station ===
The GIS-Station is the Klaus Tschira Competence Centre for digital geographical media. It offers learning opportunities in the fields of remote sensing, geographical information systems and GPS. With this, the station seeks to support teachers' and students' skills in using digital geographical media. This is based on the assumption that digital geographical media will help students to better explore the Earth and facets of global change. The project is attended by the college of education Heidelberg.

=== Explore Science ===
Every year since 2006, the Klaus Tschira Foundation has been hosting science adventure days in Luisenpark, Mannheim. Children, students, teachers and parents are able to go on natural scientific expeditions with competitions for students, oral presentations, as well as experiments and hands-on exhibitions. Since 2018, the event also takes place in the city of Bremen and from 2021 on at Mainau Island. A different scientific theme is chosen for Explore Science each year.

=== House of Astronomy ===
Since 2012 the Haus der Astronomie near Heidelberg is a center for education of astronomy in schools, offers workshops for teachers of astronomy, operates a planetarium and works as a center for outreach to the general public. Building and operation is funded by the Foundation.

== Research ==
Another main goal of the foundation’s work is the use of research results for the benefit of society. Therefore, the foundation supports young academics, conducts its own research and sponsors projects of other institutions initiated by the Klaus Tschira Foundation.

=== Heidelberg Institute for Theoretical Studies ===
In January 2010, the Heidelberg Institute for Theoretical Studies (HITS) opened its doors as the successor of the European Media Laboratories (EML) Research, which was founded in 2003. As a sister institute of the application-oriented EML, it has the agenda to engage in long-term oriented, fundamental scientific research, irrespective of popular trends. The investigators come from the following fields: life sciences, scientific databases and computational linguistics, theoretical astrophysics, statistic methods and computational sciences. The institute pursues an interdisciplinary and cooperative approach.

=== Klaus Tschira Laboratory for Physical Dating ===
The Klaus Tschira Laboratory for physical age determination is an institution of the Reiss Engelhorn Museum Mannheim and a related institute of the University of Tübingen. Humanistic considerations regarding the dating of artwork are examined with the aid of natural scientific methods such as radiocarbon dating. It is part of the Curt-Engelhorn-Centre of Archaeometry gGmbH, which is a research institute that operates nationally and internationally and, at the same time, a service provider in the field of archaeometry.

== Science Communication ==
In order to promote the dialogue between scientists and non-scientists, the Klaus Tschira Foundation supports journalists and scientists in developing communicative skills.

=== KlarText-Prize for Science Communication ===
Since 2006, the Klaus Tschira Stiftung has been looking for young scientists who write a generally understandable article in German about their research and the content of their PhD thesis. The prize is awarded in each of the categories biology, chemistry, information technology, mathematics, neurosciences and physics as well as in closely related fields. Participation is open to young scientists graduating within the previous two years with an excellent final grade. Contributions are judged for scientific quality and public understanding by a panel of experts on science and communication, respectively. With this competition, the Klaus Tschira Stiftung pursues the goal of advancing public awareness for the natural sciences, mathematics and information technology. The ability to communicate is fundamental to making innovative research findings accessible to an interested but rather non-scientific audience. Yearly, up to eight winners receive the award endowed with prize money of €7,500 each. Furthermore, the prize-winning contributions are released in the KlarText-Magazine. All competitors are offered a participation in a two-day workshop for science communication. The Klaus Tschira Prize was first awarded from 1996 to 1999, but at the time was restricted to graduates from the University of Karlsruhe. The competition was revived in 2005 and since 2006 has been open to participants nationwide.

=== NaWik ===
The vision of the National Institute for Science Communication (NaWik) is to improve the information flow from academic research to the public with the goal of a more scientifically literate society. For that purpose, the NaWik trains scientists to communicate their intentions, findings and issues to a wider audience and engage with society for a dialogue. It offers a wide range of seminars and workshops for the academic community. The NaWik is an institute of the Klaus Tschira Stiftung and the Karlsruhe Institute of Technology.
