= Heidelberg Institute for Theoretical Studies =

German research institute

The Heidelberg Institute for Theoretical Studies (HITS gGmbH) is a non-profit research institution founded in 2010 by Klaus Tschira, co-founder of SAP, through the Klaus Tschira Stiftung foundation. Situated at the intersection of the natural sciences, mathematics, and computer science, it is dedicated to the exploration of fundamental research, with its core focus being in the realm of processing, structuring, and analysis of datasets, encompassing a diverse array of research fields, from molecular biology to astrophysics.

HITS actively collaborates with universities, research institutions, and industry partners. The institute has a multifaceted ownership structure, with key stakeholders including the "HITS-Stiftung", Heidelberg University and the Karlsruhe Institute of Technology (KIT). External funding sources from the Federal Ministry of Education and Research, the German Research Foundation and the European Union, play a pivotal role in supporting its research endeavors.

== Research groups ==
As at 2017, HITS comprised the following research groups:

Astroinformatics (AIN)

The Astroinformatics group develops new approaches to analyze and process the increasing amount of data in astronomy. The approaches of this group are based on machine/statistical learning and assist the researchers in performing the required analyses.

Computational Molecular Evolution (CME)

The Computational Molecular Evolution group develops methods, new software, and new computer architectures for computing phylogenies (evolutionary trees). Furthermore, it provides expertise in parallel computing and computer architecture to other research groups. It also maintains and operates the scientific computing cluster and the IT infrastructure at HITS.

Computational Statistics (CST)

The Computational Statistics group works on mathematical foundations and statistical methodology for forecasting. The aim is to develop methods for probabilistic forecasts, to generate predictive probability distributions for future events and quantities. The group's second research focus is on spatial statistics, which is concerned with the analysis and interpretation of spatially distributed data.

Data Mining and Uncertainty Quantification (DMQ)

The Data Mining and Uncertainty Quantification group makes use of technology from the fields of High Performance Computing and Uncertainty Quantification in order to quantify uncertainties in large data sets towards reliable insights in Data Mining.

Groups and Geometry (GRG)

The Groups and Geometry group investigates various mathematical problems in the fields of geometry and topology, which involve the interplay between geometric spaces, such as Riemannian manifolds or metric spaces, and groups, arising for example from symmetries, acting on them.

Machine Learning and Artificial Intelligence (MLI)

The MLI group works on novel algorithms and models for data-efficient learning, geometric deep learning, and interpretability.

Molecular Biomechanics (MBM)

The Molecular Biomechanics group develops simulation techniques and continuum mechanics models for identifying the force-bearing structural elements in complex biological materials and for modifying them so that they have certain desired properties. The overall goal is to investigate how proteins respond to mechanical forces and why.

Molecular and Cellular Modeling (MCM)

The Molecular and Cellular Modeling group detects and simulates the behavior of molecules with computer-aided methods and software tools. Furthermore, they develop interactive web-based visualization tools and applications for complex molecular simulations.

Natural Language Processing (NLP)

The Natural Language Processing group focuses on the semantics and pragmatics of discourse. The group develops software facilitating the multimodal dialogue between users and machines. The aim is to use the computer for understanding and generating language and texts and to make use of computers more naturally in the long term.

Physics of Stellar Objects (PSO)

The Physics of Stellar Objects group is conducting research on stars and stellar explosions. One of the main goals of the group is to simulate thermonuclear explosions of white dwarfs, which lead to Type Ia supernovae.

Scientific Databases and Visualization (SDBV)

The Scientific Databases and Visualization group focuses on scientific databases and on the visualization of scientific data. The objective is to consolidate knowledge scattered all over the world and to make it easily accessible to scientists.

Stellar Evolution Theory (SET)

The Stellar Evolution Theory group investigates the turbulent and explosive lives of massive stars. The group focuses on massive binary stars and the intricate merging process. Mergers produce strong magnetic fields, and the merger products may forge highly-magnetised neutron stars in their terminal supernova explosions. These magnetic neutron stars are known as magnetars.

Theory and Observations of Stars (TOS)

The Theory and Observations of Stars group investigates the physical processes that take place in stars and how these change as a function of stellar evolution. The group focuses on low-mass main-sequence stars, subgiants, and red giants and uses a method known as asteroseismology for their research.

== Former research groups ==
Following research groups have been conducting research at HITS:

Computational Biology (CBI)

The CBI research group started in 2013 at HITS under the junior group leader Siegfried Schloissnig. The group investigated the genome of salamanders and flatworms. After almost five years of intensive research, Schloissnig and his team – together with colleagues from Dresden and Vienna – managed to decipher the genome of the Mexican salamander Axolotl and the flatworm Schmidtea mediterranea. Both animals are important organisms in regeneration research. The research results have been published in the scientific journal Nature. Since 2018 Siegfried Schloissnig has continued his research at the Research Institute of Molecular Pathology (IMP) in Vienna.

Computational Carbon Chemistry (CCC)

The Computational Carbon Chemistry group was established in 2019 and used computational chemistry to explore and exploit organic materials, focusing on graphene-based materials. The group developed computer-based tools and concepts for designing and screening new graphene-based materials and devices with target applications in metal-free catalysis and molecular electronics. In 2024, after five years of intensive research, junior group leader Dr Ganna (Anya) Gryn’ova took up a position as Birmingham Fellow and Associate Professor of Computational Chemistry at the University of Birmingham.

High-Energy Astrophysics and Cosmology (HAC)

The HAC research group started 2016 at HITS. The group leader Christoph Pfrommer worked at HITS since 2010, did his habilitation there and earned an ERC Consolidator Grant that enabled him to build up his own junior research group at HITS. As of April 1, 2017, Pfrommer is leading the research group Cosmology and Large-scale Structure at the Leibniz Institute for Astrophysics Potsdam (AIP) and professor for astrophysics at the University of Potsdam. His group stayed at HITS until summer 2017 and then also moved to Potsdam.

Theoretical Astrophysics (TAP)

The TAP group started in March 2013 at HITS under the group leader Volker Springel. Springel designed and implemented the largest and most comprehensive computer simulations of the Universe thus far: the Millennium Simulation 2005, the "Illustris" Simulation 2014, and the "Illustris TNG" Simulation 2018. He served as leader of the research group "Theoretical Astrophysics" at HITS from March 2010 while simultaneously working as Professor of Theoretical Astrophysics at Heidelberg University. At HITS, among many other things, Springel refined the "Arepo" code that he had developed, thereby making it possible to simulate the diverse shapes and sizes of galaxies with supercomputers. To date, the code has been used or cited in more than 750 publications. Springel received an ERC Starting Grant in 2012 and has been a "Highly Cited Researcher" since 2014. He became a member of the German National Academy of Sciences Leopoldina in 2017. As of 1 August 2018, he assumes his new position as Director of the Max Planck Institute for Astrophysics in Garching. Springel had already been appointed Max Planck Director last year but continued to work at HITS and Heidelberg University until the end of July 2018.
