= German Informatics Society =

German professional society

- Gesellschaft für Informatik
- Abbreviation: GI
- Formation: September 16, 1969; 57 years ago
- Type: Registered association
- Purpose: Professional society for computer science
- Headquarters: Bonn, Germany
- Members: 20,000
- President: Christine Regitz
- Affiliations: International Federation for Information Processing
- Website: gi.de

The German Informatics Society (GI) (German: Gesellschaft für Informatik) is a German professional society for computer science, with around 20,000 personal and 250 corporate members. It is the biggest organized representation of its kind in the German-speaking world.

== History ==
The German Informatics Society was founded in Bonn, Germany, on September 16, 1969. Initially aimed primarily at researchers, it expanded in the mid-1970s to include computer science professionals, and in 1978 it founded its journal Informatik Spektrum to reach this broader audience.

The Deutsche Informatik-Akademie in Bonn was founded in 1987 by the German Informatics Society in order to provide seminars and continuing education for computer science professionals. In 1990, the German Informatics Society contributed to the founding of the International Conference and Research Center for Computer Science (renamed since as the Leibniz Center for Informatics) at Dagstuhl; since its founding, Schloss Dagstuhl has become a major center for international academic workshops.

In 1983, the German Informatics Society became a member society of the International Federation for Information Processing (IFIP), taking over the role of representing Germany from the Deutsche Arbeitsgemeinschaft für Rechenanlagen. In 1989, it joined the Council of European Professional Informatics Societies.

== Activities ==
The main activity of the association is to support the professional development of its members in every aspect of the rapidly changing field of informatics. In order to realise this aim the German Informatics Society maintains a large number of committees, special interest groups, and working groups in the field of theory of computation, artificial intelligence, bioinformatics, software engineering, human computer interaction, databases, technical informatics, graphics and information visualisation, business informatics, legal aspects of computing, computer science education, social computing, and computer security.

Up to now, the GI runs more than 30 local groups in cooperation with the German chapter of the Association for Computing Machinery. Other important GI activities include raising public awareness of informatics, including its benefits and risks. Lobbying activities have been organised by the office in Berlin since 2013. Additionally, the GI runs programmes designed for young people and women to foster interest in informatics.

In addition to the Informatik Spektrum, which is the journal of the society, most of the society's special interest groups maintain their own journals. Overall the society has approximately 40 regular publications, and it sponsors a similar number of conferences and events annually. Many of these conferences have their proceedings published in the GI's book series, Lecture Notes in Informatics, which also publishes Ph.D. thesis abstracts and research monographs.

Every two years, the German Informatics Society awards the Konrad Zuse Medal to an outstanding German computer science researcher. It also offers prizes for the best Ph.D. thesis, for computer science education, for practical innovations, and for teams of student competitors. Each year beginning in 2002, the GI has elected a small number of its members as fellows, its highest membership category.

== Conferences ==
=== INFORMATIK ===
One of the biggest informatics conferences in the German-speaking world is the INFORMATIK. The conference is organised in cooperation with universities, each year in a different location. More than 1.000 participants visit workshops and keynotes regarding current challenges in the field of information technology. In addition, several special interest groups organise large meetings with an international reputation, for example the „Software Engineering (SE)“, the „Multikonferenz Wirtschaftsinformatik (MKWI), the „Mensch-Computer-Interaktion (MCI)“ and the „Datenbanksysteme für Business, Technologie und Web (BTW)“.

=== DIMVA ===
The Detection of Intrusions and Malware, and Vulnerability Assessment event, designed to serve as a general forum for discussing malware and the vulnerability of computing systems to attacks, is another annual project under the auspices of the organization. Its last conference was held from 6 July to 7 July in the city of Bonn, Germany, being sponsored by entities such as Google, Rohde & Schwarz, and VMRay.

=== BTW ===
The conference on Database Systems for Business, Technology and Web (BTW) is the conference of the German Informatics Society's (GI) special interest group on databases and information systems (DBIS).

With a solid acceptance rate of 15% to 40% the conference has been ranked in the international CORE ranking as it is seen competitive to A-ranked conferences although the BTW focuses on senior professors from Germany, Austrian and Swiss universities serving as chairs.

Database Systems for Business, Technology and Web
- Abbreviation: BTW
- Discipline: databases and information systems

Publication details
- Publisher: Lecture Notes in Informatics (LNI), GI
- History: 1985–
- Frequency: biennial
- Open access: yes
- Website: https://fb-dbis.gi.de/btw-konferenz

==== Structure and history ====
The biennial BTW conference series started in 1985 in Karlsruhe with 320 participants. Since then it has been held every two years at German and Swiss universities. It can be seen as the GI's counterpart to the ACM SIGMOD and CIKM conferences. Although it is an international conference with English as the conference language, it is mainly aimed at German-speaking groups and is considered to be the most important conference in the field of database systems in the German-speaking area.

The conference itself consists of a research and industrial programme including presentations or demonstrations of the papers published in the conference proceedings. At the conference, the DBIS group awards several prizes, including the prize for the best dissertation in Database and Information Systems and the prizes for the best papers. Several workshops will be held in conjunction with the conference.

==== Venues of BTW conferences ====
Nr.	Year	Location	Chairs	Date
1	1985	Karlsruhe	Peter Lockemann, Wollfried Stucky, Albrecht Blaser	March 20–22, 1985
2	1987	Darmstadt	Hans-Jörg Schek, Gunter Schlageter	April 1–3, 1987
3	1989	Zürich	Carl August Zehnder, Theo Härder	March 1–3, 1989
4	1991	Kaiserslautern	Theo Härder, Hans-Jürgen Appelrath	March 6–8, 1991
5	1993	Braunschweig	Hans-Dieter Ehrich, Wollfried Stucky	March 3–5, 1993
6	1995	Dresden	Klaus Meyer-Wegener, Georg Lausen	March 22–24, 1995
7	1997	Ulm	Peter Dadam, Klaus R. Dittrich	March 5–7, 1997
8	1999	Freiburg im Breisgau	Georg Lausen, Alexandro Buchmann	March 1–3, 1999
9	2001	Oldenburg (Oldb)	Hans-Jürgen Appelrath, Andreas Heuer	March 7–9, 2001
10	2003	Leipzig	Erhard Rahm, Gerhard Weikum	February 26–28, 2003
11	2005	Karlsruhe	Peter Lockemann, Wolffried Stucky, Gottfried Vossen	March 2–4, 2005
12	2007	Aachen	Matthias Jarke, Thomas Seidl, Alfons Kemper	March 5–9, 2007
13	2009	Münster	Gottfried Vossen, Johann-Christoph Freytag	March 2–6, 2009
14	2011	Kaiserslautern	Theo Härder, Bernhard Mitschang	February 28 – March 4, 2011
15	2013	Magdeburg	Gunter Saake, Volker Markl	March 11–15, 2013
16	2015	Hamburg	Thomas Seidl	March 2–6, 2015
17	2017	Stuttgart	Bernhard Mitschang, Daniela Nicklas	March 6–10, 2017
18	2019	Rostock	Andreas Heuer, Torsten Grust, Felix Naumann	March 4–8, 2019
19	2021	Dresden (online)	Wolfgang Lehner, Kai-Uwe Sattler, Melanie Herschel	April 19 – June 21, 2021 (weekly lectures)
20	2023	Dresden	Wolfgang Lehner, Stefanie Scherzinger, Birgitta König-Ries	March 6–10, 2023
21	2025	Bamberg		March 3–7, 2025

== Honorary members ==
The following people are honorary members of the German Informatics Society due to their achievements in the field of informatics.

- Konrad Zuse (since 1985)
- Friedrich Ludwig Bauer (since 1987)
- Wilfried Brauer (since 2000)
- Günter Hotz (since 2002)
- Joseph Weizenbaum (since 2003)
- Gerhard Krüger (since 2007)
- Heinz Schwärtzel (since 2008)

== Associated societies ==
- Swiss Informatics Society
- Gesellschaft für Informatik in der Land-, Forst- und Ernährungswirtschaft (GIL)
- German Chapter of the ACM (GChACM)
