= Peter Lockemann =

German computer scientist (1935–2025)

- Lockemann, c. 2005
- Born: 17 November 1935; Berlin, Germany
- Died: 21 July 2025 (aged 89)
- Education: Technical University of Munich
- Scientific career
- Fields: Computer science
- Workplaces: Karlsruhe Institute of Technology
- Thesis: Die nichtlinearen Verzerrungen in A-Verstärkern mit Transistoren bei niedrigen Frequenzen (1963)
- Doctoral advisor: Hans Piloty
- Doctoral students: Klaus Dittrich; Guido Moerkotte

Peter Christian Lockemann (17 November 1935 – 21 July 2025) was a German computer scientist and academic who was professor of computer science at the Karlsruhe Institute of Technology and was director at the FZI Forschungszentrum Informatik Karlsruhe (FZI). He retired in March 2004.

Lockemann was considered a pioneer of business information systems and was involved in the development of databases and information systems. He published textbooks and over 100 scientific articles.

== Life and career ==
Lockemann studied Electrical Engineering at the Technical University of Munich and finished his doctoral studies in 1963 under the supervision of Hans Piloty. He was subsequently a Research Fellow at the California Institute of Technology. From 1972, the founding year of the Faculty of Computer Science at the University of Karlsruhe, he was a professor there, from 1979 to 1981 dean, and until his retirement he headed the group for Information Management Systems.

In 1985, together with several colleagues, he founded the FZI Research Centre for Computer Science in Karlsruhe. He also held several guest professorships in the USA, including at the California Institute of Technology and at the MIT, and held advisory positions with industry and ministries.

In 2003, the Johann Wolfgang Goethe University of Frankfurt am Main awarded him an honorary doctorate for his achievements in research and as a promoter of knowledge transfer into business practice. In 2005 he received the Cross of the Order of Merit of the Federal Republic of Germany.

Lockemann died on 21 July 2025, at the age of 89.
