= Soccer robot =

Robot that can play soccer like a human

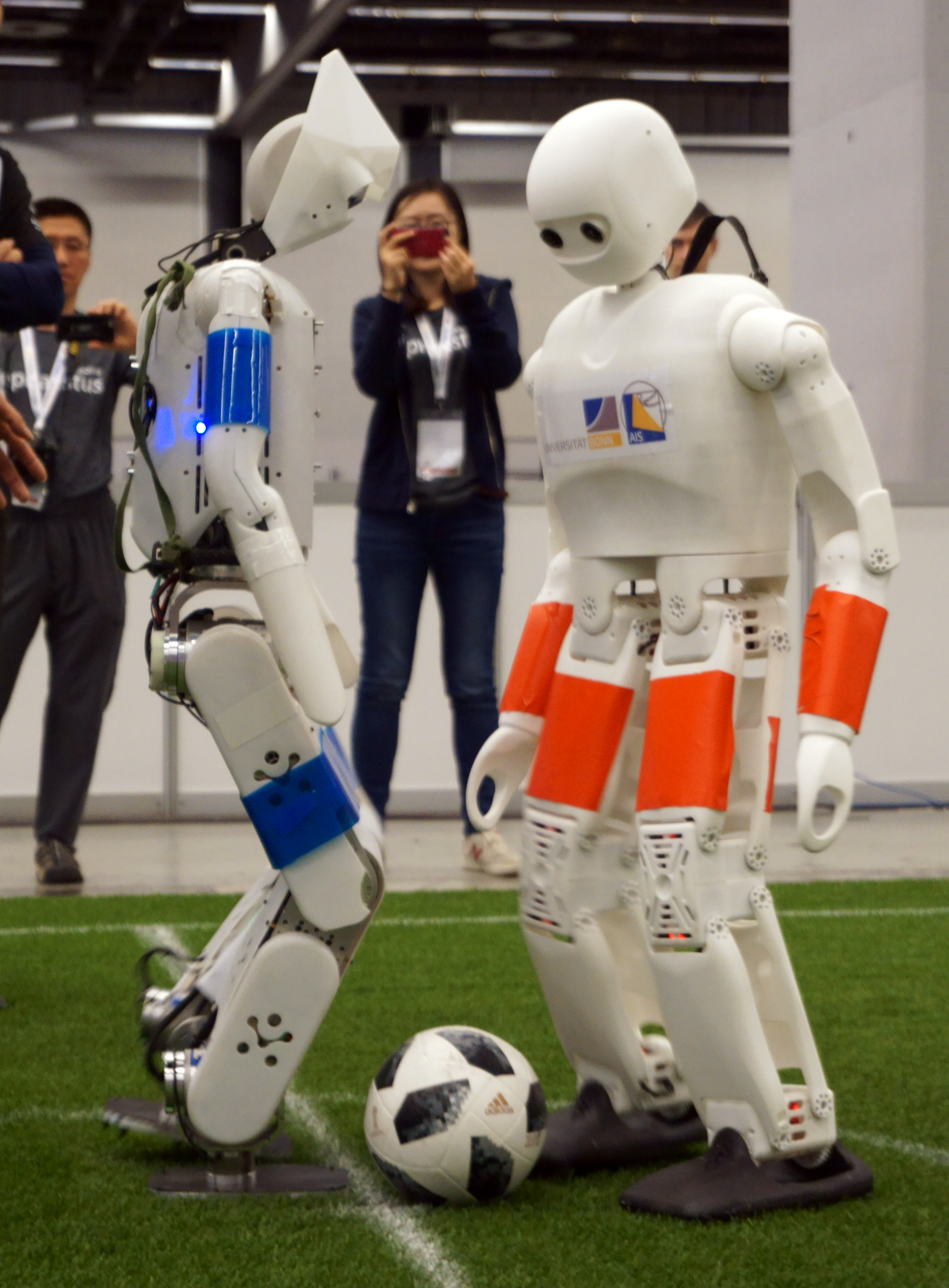
NimbRo-OP2X Humanoid Soccer Robot at RoboCup 2018 in Montreal

A soccer robot is a specialized autonomous robot and mobile robot that is used to play variants of football.

The main organised competitions are the annual RoboCup and FIRA (Federation of International Robot-Soccer Association) tournaments.

== Leagues ==
The RoboCup contest currently has a number of football leagues:

- Standard Platform League (formerly Four Legged League)
  - Small Size League
  - Middle Size League
  - Simulation League
    - 2D Soccer Simulation
    - 3D Soccer Simulation
- Humanoid League

Additionally, there is a RoboCupJunior league for younger students.

== qfix Soccer robot ==
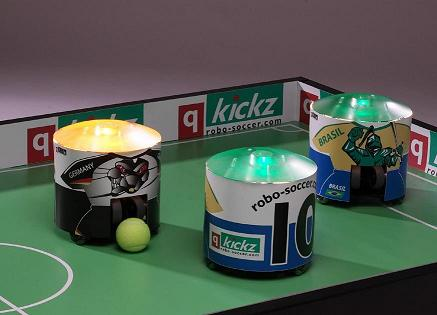
qfix "Terminator"

The qfix football robot "Terminator" is an omnidrive robot that can be used for RoboCup Junior. It includes a kicker and a dribbler as well as a controller board with Atmel controller.

The robot can be programmed using the GNU GCC compiler.

== Graupner RC-SOCCERBOT ==
The Graupner "RC-SOCCERBOT" is a mobile robot platform developed by qfix which can be used as a radio-controller toy playing soccer with ping-pong balls. Gaining more experience in robotics the user can also implement C++ programs on the robot.
