= TekBots =

Programmable robots used for education

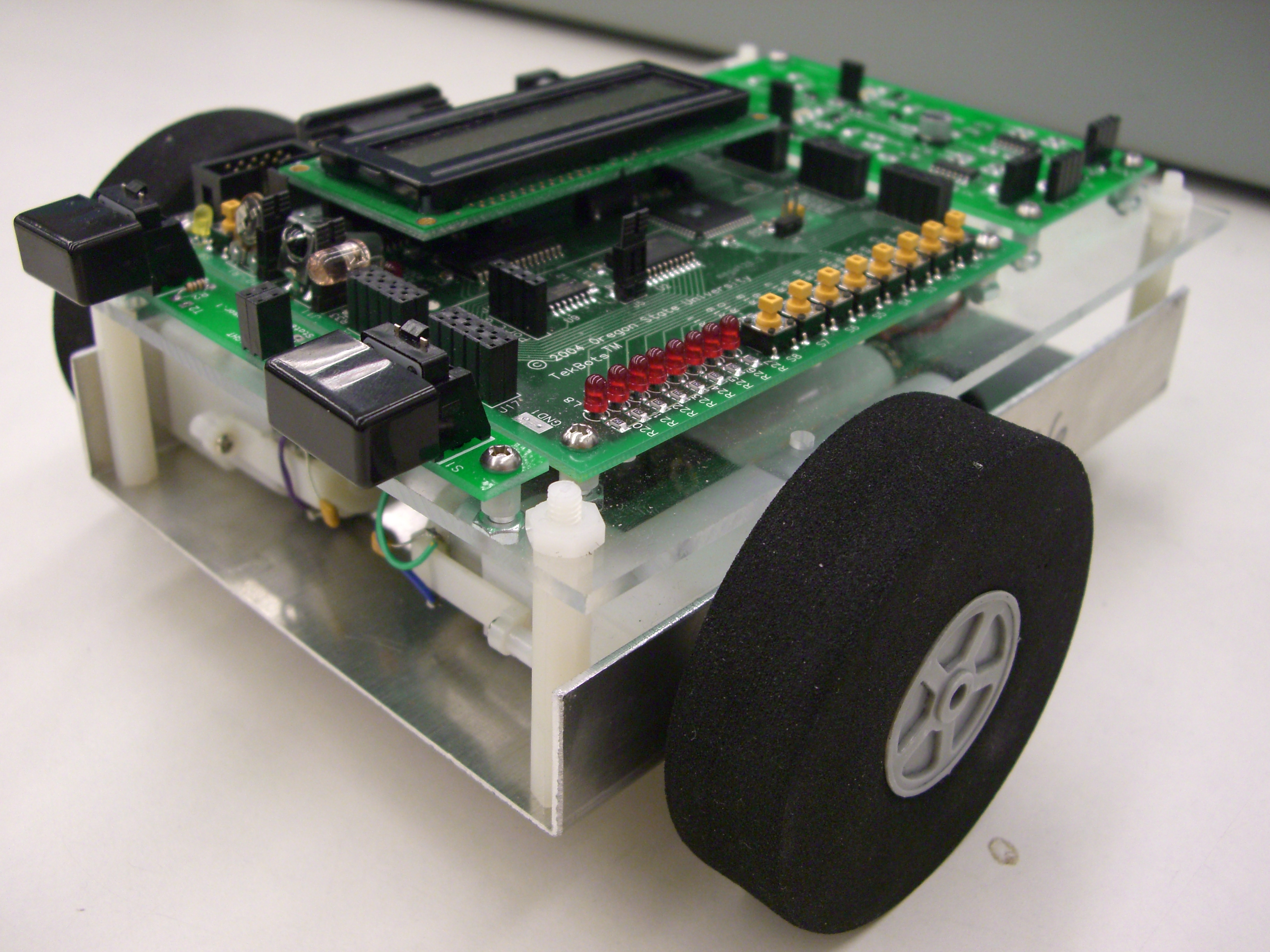
A TekBot equipped with the Atmega 128.2 microcontroller board.

TekBots are programmable robots used by several universities to help students learn some of the fundamental concepts that are found in the fields of computer and electrical engineering.

TekBots are centered on the Atmel microcontroller platform. This is the "brain" of the robot as it controls the robot's two motorized wheels allowing it to move. The robot's controller boards, wheels and all other peripherals are housed in an aluminum base.

== History ==
The original TekBots program was developed by the Oregon State University College of Engineering. Professors there wanted to provide a fun and interesting way for students to get excited about engineering. In 2000, the TekBots program was able to get off the ground with a $500,000 grant from the Oregon-based company, Tektronix inc.

Freshman students entering Oregon State University's engineering program start out with $80 worth of electronics to build their initial TekBot. As the students take more and more classes while in the electrical and computer engineering program, more and more functionality is added to the robots; such as bump sensors to sense when the robot has struck a wall or LCD screens to display a message or even infrared (IR) transmitters and receivers to communicate with the robot.

Students program the robot using such software as AVR Studio 4 in order to write and compile a C program. The program is then transferred to the robot via a USB or parallel port dongle.

The TekBots program at Oregon State University is still seed-funded by Tektronix today.

TekBots is currently offered by 5 universities worldwide:

- Oregon State University
- Iowa State University
- Rochester Institute of Technology
- University of Nebraska–Lincoln
- Fukuoka Institute of Technology

Several community colleges and other universities have also purchased TekBots over the years.

== Current classes ==
At most of the colleges the TekBot is used in an introduction to the electrical engineering course. At Oregon State they are used as a platform for learning in 10 classes. At Nebraska they are used in three classes in combination with the Mega 128 microcontroller. Also at Rochester they are used in digital logic courses as well as the microprocessor and introduction classes.

Both Nebraska and Oregon State combine the TekBot in integrating a freshman mentoring program.

Many senior design projects at Oregon State are completed with the TekBot. An example was the Tekway, a Segway built using TekBots brains.

== See also ==
- Vex Robotics Design System
- Qfix
- Robot kit
