= SPL =

SPL may refer to:

== Sports ==
=== Association football (soccer) ===
- Football Association of Finland (Suomen Palloliitto)
- Saudi Professional League
- Scottish Premier League
- Slovenian PrvaLiga
- SportPesa Premier League, Kenya
- Singapore Premier League
- Swiss Promotion League
- RoboCup Standard Platform League, matches between autonomous robots

=== Other sports ===
- Saurashtra Premier League, an Indian cricket league

== Computing ==
=== Programming languages ===
- System programming language, the general concept of language for programming operating systems
- Systems Programming Language, a systems programming language for HP/3000 minicomputers
- Shakespeare Programming Language, an esoteric language that looks like Shakespeare's plays
- Space Programming Language, influenced by JOVIAL

=== Other uses in computing ===
- Spl (Unix) functions to set priority level
- Secondary Program Loader
- Software product line
- Solana Program Library, a collection of programs on the Solana blockchain platform
- Standard PHP Library, used in PHP5 onwards
- Sun Public License, Sun Microsystems
- RoboCup Standard Platform League, autonomous robot association football matches

== Political organizations ==
- Sammarineses for Freedom, Italian: Sammarinesi per la Libertà, a political party in San Marino
- Socialist Party of Latvia, formed in 1994
- Secular Pro-Life, in the United States

== Science and medicine ==
- Scanning probe lithography, a direct contact method of lithography
- Sound pressure level, a measure of sound pressure
- Spore photoproduct lyase, an enzyme
- Stretched penile length, measuring Human penis size
- Structured Product Labeling of prescription drug
- Superior parietal lobule

== Transportation and commerce ==
- Sailplane Pilot Licence, a basic pilot licence
- Amsterdam Airport Schiphol, Netherlands (by former IATA code)
- Sri Petaling Line, a rapid transit line in Malaysia
- Saudi Post (SPL), logistics company
- Finnish Wood Workers' Union, a former trade union

== Other uses ==
- Senior Patrol Leader, a youth role in many Scouting organizations
- SPL: Sha Po Lang, 2005 Hong Kong action film
- Service de police de Longueuil, the police department of Longueuil, Quebec
- Seattle Public Library, public library system in the United States
- Scottish Poetry Library, Edinburgh, Scotland
