= RoboCup =

Annual robotics competition

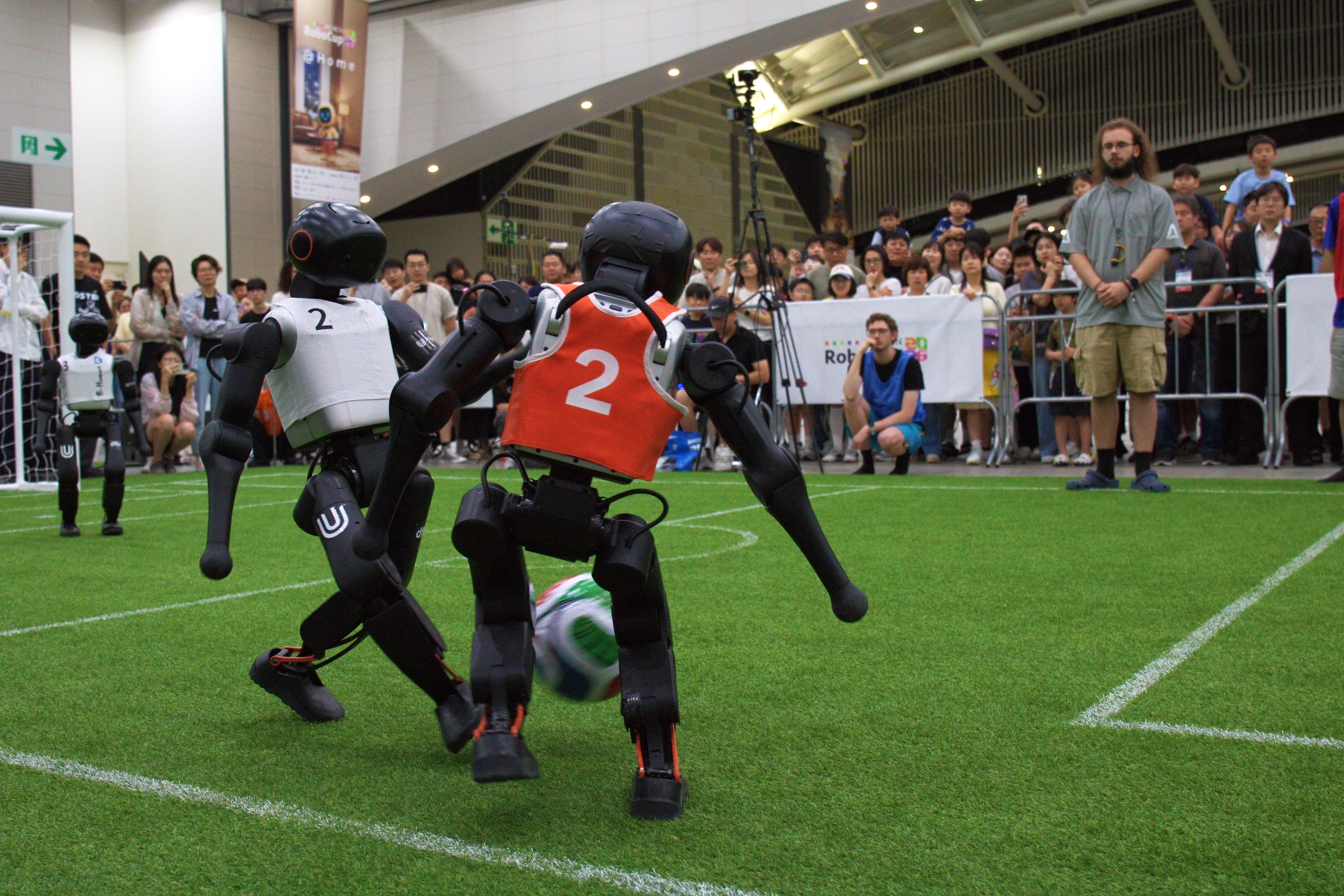
Two robots competing for the ball at RoboCup 2026

RoboCup is an annual international robotics competition founded in 1996 by a group of university professors (including Hiroaki Kitano, Manuela M. Veloso, Itsuki Noda and Minoru Asada). The aim of the competition is to promote robotics and AI research by offering a publicly appealing – but formidable – challenge.

The name RoboCup is a contraction of the competition's full name, "Robot World Cup Initiative" (based on the FIFA World Cup), but there are many other areas of competition such as "RoboCupRescue", "RoboCup@Home" and "RoboCupJunior".

The official goal of the project is:

"By the middle of the 21st century, a team of fully autonomous humanoid robot soccer players shall win a soccer game, complying with the official rules of FIFA, against the winner of the most recent World Cup."

== RoboCup leagues ==
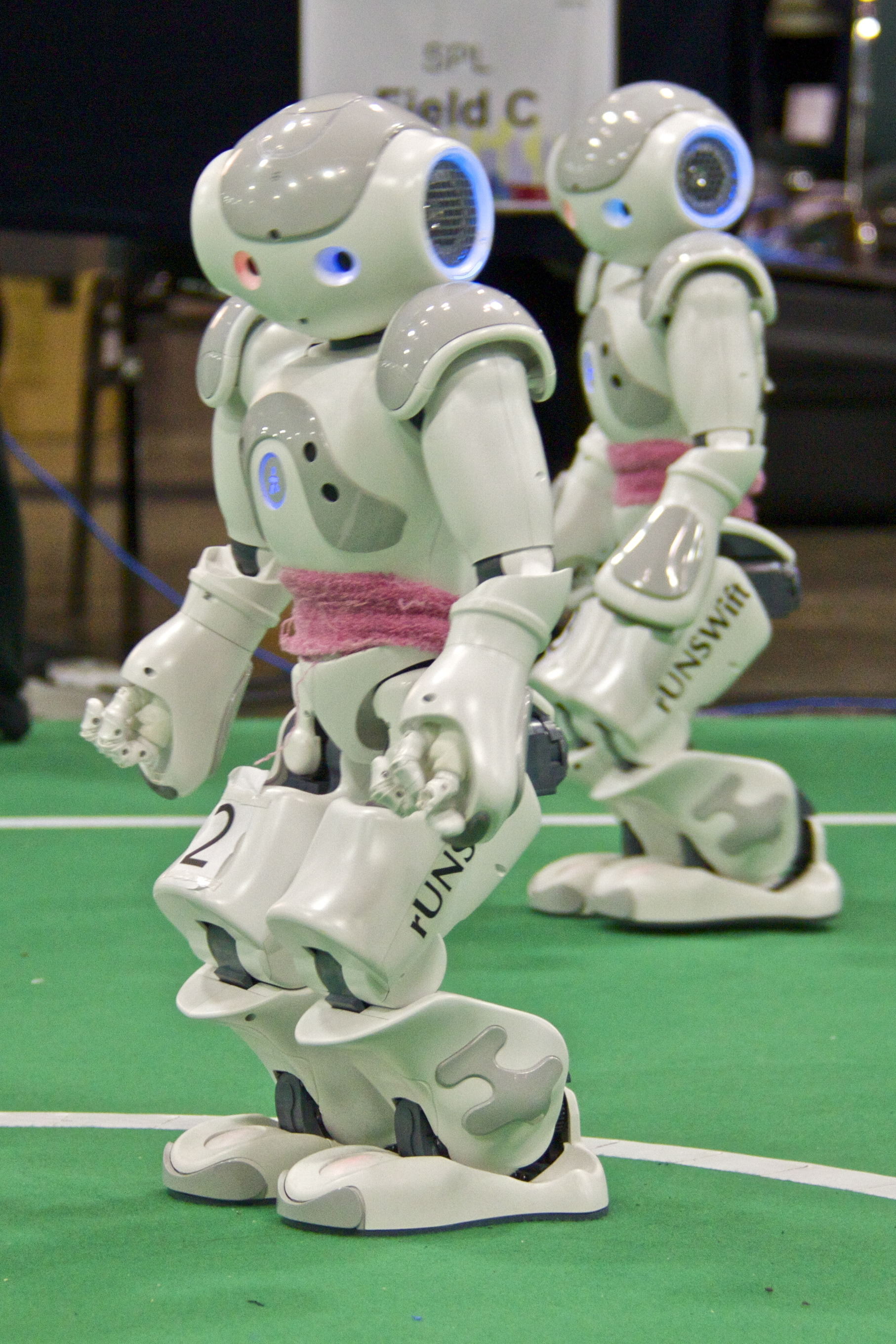
Team rUNSWift competing in the Standard Platform League at RoboCup 2010 in Singapore

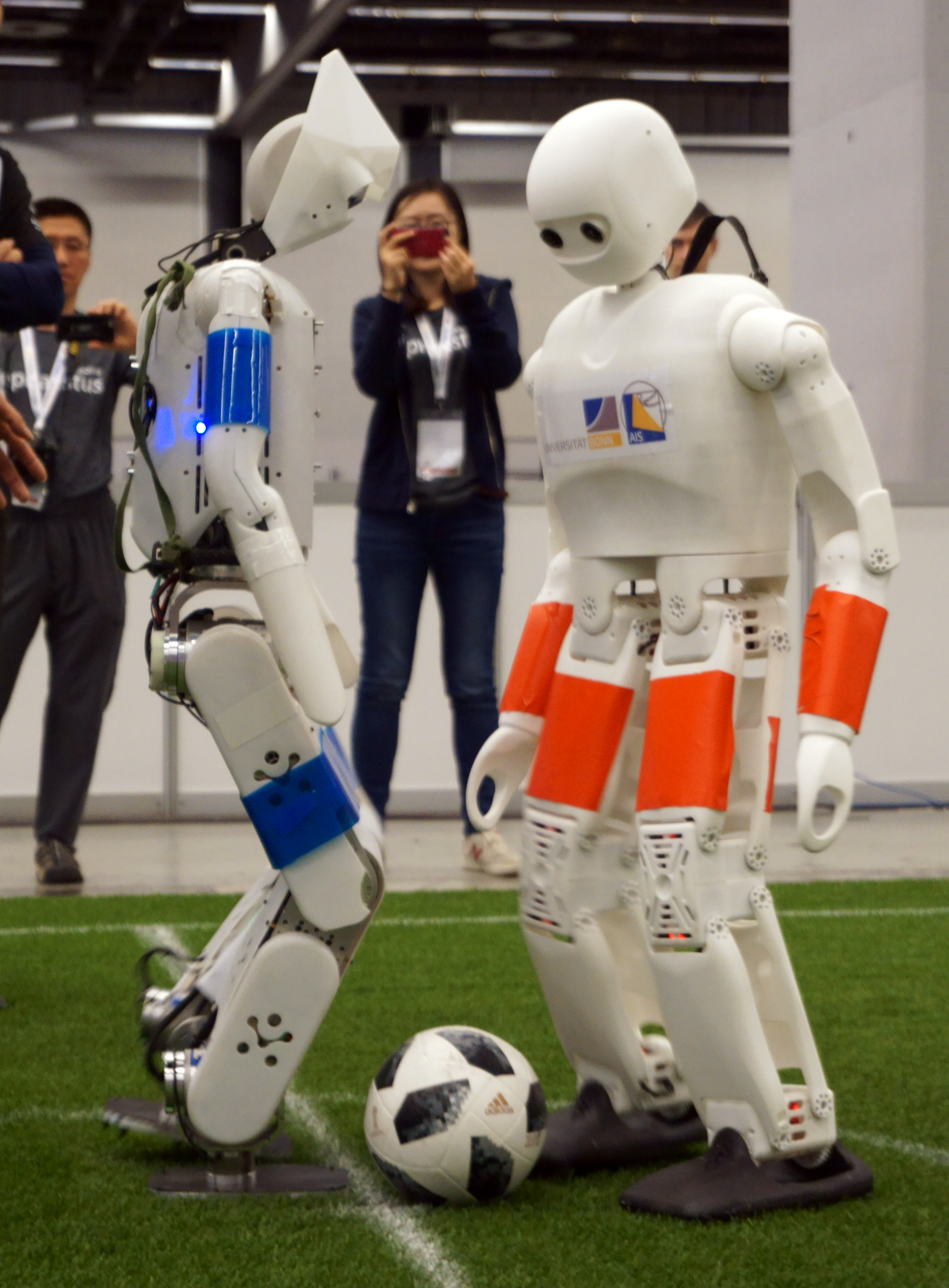
NimbRo-OP2X robot in Humanoid AdultSize game át RoboCup 2018 in Montreal.

The contest currently has six major domains of competition, each with a number of leagues and sub-leagues. These include:

- RoboCup Soccer
  - Standard Platform League (formerly Four Legged League)
  - Small Size League
  - Middle Size League
  - Simulation League
    - 2D Soccer Simulation
    - 3D Soccer Simulation
  - Humanoid League
- RoboCup Rescue League
  - Rescue Robot League
  - Rescue Simulation League
  - Rapidly Manufactured Robot Challenge (RMRC) for participants up to the age of 19.
- RoboCup@Home, which debuted in 2006, focuses on the introduction of autonomous robots to human society
  - RoboCup@Home Open Platform League (formerly just RoboCup@Home)
  - Robocup@Home Domestic Standard Platform League
  - RoboCup@Home Social Standard Platform League
- RoboCup Logistics League, which debuted in 2012, is an application-driven league inspired by the industrial scenario of a smart factory
- RoboCup@Work, which debuted in 2016, "targets the use of robots in work-related scenarios"
- RoboCup Junior
  - Soccer League
  - OnStage (formerly Dance) League
  - Rescue League
  - Rescue CoSpace League

Each team is fully autonomous in all RoboCup leagues. Once the game starts, the only input from any human is from the referee.

== RoboCup editions ==
Number	Year	Host city	Host country	Number of teams	Number of countries	Number of participants
1	RoboCup 1997	Nagoya	Japan	38	11	
2	RoboCup 1998	Paris	France	63	19	
3	RoboCup 1999	Stockholm	Sweden	85	23	
4	RoboCup 2000	Melbourne	Australia	110	19	
5	RoboCup 2001	Seattle	United States	141	22	
6	RoboCup 2002	Fukuoka	Japan	197	29	
7	RoboCup 2003	Padua	Italy	238	35	
8	RoboCup 2004	Lisbon	Portugal	345	37	
9	RoboCup 2005	Osaka	Japan	387	36	
10	RoboCup 2006	Bremen	Germany	440	35	
11	RoboCup 2007	Atlanta	United States	321	39	1,966
12	RoboCup 2008	Suzhou	China	373	35	
13	RoboCup 2009	Graz	Austria	407	43	2,472
14	RoboCup 2010	Singapore	Singapore	500	40	3,000
15	RoboCup 2011	Istanbul	Turkey	451	40	2,691
16	RoboCup 2012	Mexico City	Mexico	381	42	2,356
17	RoboCup 2013	Eindhoven	Netherlands	410	45	3,033
18	RoboCup 2014	João Pessoa	Brazil	358	45	2,900
19	RoboCup 2015	Hefei	China	346	43	2,032
20	RoboCup 2016	Leipzig	Germany	404	45	3,500
21	RoboCup 2017	Nagoya	Japan	500	50	2,520
22	RoboCup 2018	Montreal	Canada	360	40	2,345
23	RoboCup 2019	Sydney	Australia	335	40	2,200
24	RoboCup 2021	Virtual		317	43	2,129
25	RoboCup 2022	Bangkok	Thailand			
26	RoboCup 2023	Bordeaux	France			
27	RoboCup 2024	Eindhoven	Netherlands			
28	RoboCup 2025	Salvador	Brazil		45	2,000
29	RoboCup 2026	Incheon	Republic of Korea			
30	RoboCup 2027	Nuremberg	Germany			

The formal RoboCup competition was preceded by the (often unacknowledged) first International Micro Robot World Cup Soccer Tournament (MIROSOT) held by KAIST in Taejon, Korea, in November 1996. This was won by an American team from Newton Labs, and the competition was shown on CNN.

RoboCup was canceled in 2020 due to the COVID-19 pandemic. The planned host location of Bordeaux went on to host in 2023.

== RoboCup Asia-Pacific editions ==
Year	Host city	Host country	Number of teams	Number of countries	Number of participants	Website
RoboCup Asia-Pacific 2017	Bangkok	Thailand	130+	25	1000+	
RoboCup Asia-Pacific 2018	Kish Island	Iran				
RoboCup Asia-Pacific 2018	Dubai	United Arab Emirates				
RoboCup Asia-Pacific 2019	Moscow	Russia				
RoboCup Asia-Pacific 2020	Virtual					
RoboCup Asia-Pacific 2021	Aichi Prefecture / Virtual	Japan				
RoboCup Asia-Pacific 2023	Pyeongchang	South Korea				
RoboCup Asia-Pacific 2024	Qingdao	China				
RoboCup Asia-Pacific 2025	Abu Dhabi	United Arab Emirates				[7]

== European RoboCupJunior Championship ==
Year	Host city	Host country	Number of teams	Number of countries	Number of participants	Website
European RoboCupJunior Championship 2018	Pescara	Italy				
European RoboCupJunior Championship 2019	Hanover	Germany				
European RoboCupJunior Championship 2020	Cancelled due to COVID-19 pandemic					
European RoboCupJunior Championship 2021	Cancelled due to COVID-19 pandemic					
European RoboCupJunior Championship 2022	Guimarães	Portugal				
European RoboCupJunior Championship 2023	Varaždin	Croatia				
European RoboCupJunior Championship 2024	Hannover	Germany				
European RoboCupJunior Championship 2025	Bari	Italy				

== RoboCup local events ==
Warwick Mobile Robotics (from the University of Warwick) robot navigates red step fields, in the RoboCupRescue arena at the 2009 RoboCup German Open

Brainstormers Tribots (from Universität Osnabrück) play RFC Stuttgart (from Universität Stuttgart) in the RoboCupSoccer Middle-Size League at the 2009 RoboCup German Open

=== 2026 ===
- German Open in Köln

=== 2025 ===
- German Open in Nuremberg
- Greece Open in Agrinio

=== 2024 ===
- German open in Kassel

=== 2023 ===
- German open

=== 2021 ===
- RoboCup Kazakhstan, Nur-Sultan, Kazakhstan
- RoboCup Portugal Open, virtual
- RoboCup Russia Open, Tomsk, Russia
- RoboCup Brazil Open, virtual

=== 2020 ===
- RoboCup Japan Open 2020, virtual
- RoboCup China Open 2020, virtual
- RoboCup Brazil Open 2020, virtual

Events were cancelled due to COVID-19

=== 2019 ===
- RoboCup Portuguese Open 2019, Gondomar, Portugal
- RoboCup Brazil Open 2019, Rio Grande, Brazil
- RoboCup Asia Pacific 2019, Moscow, Russia
- RoboCup German Open 2019, Magdeburg, Germany
- RoboCup China Open 2019, Shaoxing, China

=== 2018 ===
- RoboCup Portugal Open 2018, Torres Vedras, Portugal
- RoboCup Asia Pacific 2018, Kish Island, Iran
- RoboCup Iran Open 2018, Tehran, Iran
- RoboCup UAE 2018, Abu Dhabi, United Arab Emirates
- RoboCup German Open 2018, Magdeburg, Germany

=== 2017 ===
- RoboCup Portugal Open 2017, Coimbra, Portugal
- RoboCup Iran Open 2017, Tehran, Iran
- RoboCup German Open 2017, Magdeburg, Germany
- RoboCup Russia Open 2017, Tomsk, Russia
- RoboCup US Open 2017, Miami, United States
- RoboCup China Open 2017, Shaoxing, China

=== 2016 ===
- RoboCup Portugal Open 2016, Bragança, Portugal
- RoboCup China Open 2016, Hefei, China
- RoboCup European Open 2016, Eindhoven, Netherlands

=== 2015 ===
- RoboCup Portugal Open 2015, Vila Real, Portugal
- RoboCup China Open 2015, Guiyang, China
- RoboCup Iran Open 2015, Tehran, Iran
- GermanOpen 2015, Magdeburg, Germany

=== 2014 ===
- RoboCup Portugal Open 2014, Espinho, Portugal
- RoboCup China Open 2014, Hefei, China
- RoboCup Iran Open 2014, Tehran, Iran
- RoboCup German Open, Magdeburg, Germany

=== 2013 ===
- RoboCup Portugal Open 2013, Lisbon, Portugal
- RoboCup Iran Open 2013, Tehran, Iran
- RoboCup German Open, Magdeburg, Germany

=== 2012 ===
- RoboCup Portugal Open 2012, Guimarães, Portugal
- RoboCup Dutch Open, Eindhoven, Netherlands
- RoboCup German Open, Magdeburg, Germany
- RoboCup Iran Open, Tehran, Iran
- RoboCup SSL North American Open, Vancouver, Canada

=== 2011 ===
- RoboCup German Open, Magdeburg, Germany
- RoboCup Portugal Open, Lisbon, Portugal
- RoboCup Iran Open 2011, Tehran, Iran

=== 2010 ===
- RoboCup Portugal Open, Leiria, Portugal
- Iran Open 2010, Tehran, Iran
- Latin America & Brazil Open 2010, São Bernardo do Campo, Brazil
- RoboCup Mediterranean Open 2010, Rome, Italy
- RoboCup German Open (unofficial all-European tournament), Magdeburg, Germany
- AUT Cup 2010, Tehran, Iran

== See also ==
- Robot
- Botball
- FIRST
- BEST Robotics
- RobotCub Consortium, a humanoid robot project to study cognition via robotics
