= RoboCup Standard Platform League =

Robotics competition league

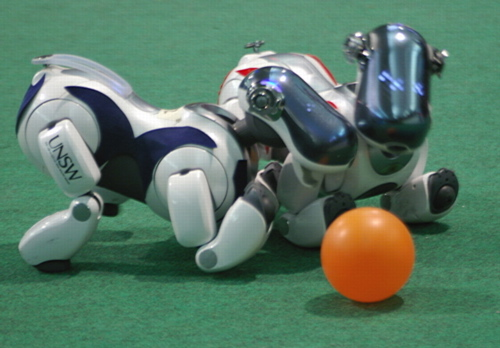
rUNSWift in a four-legged league game from RoboCup 2006 in Bremen, Germany.

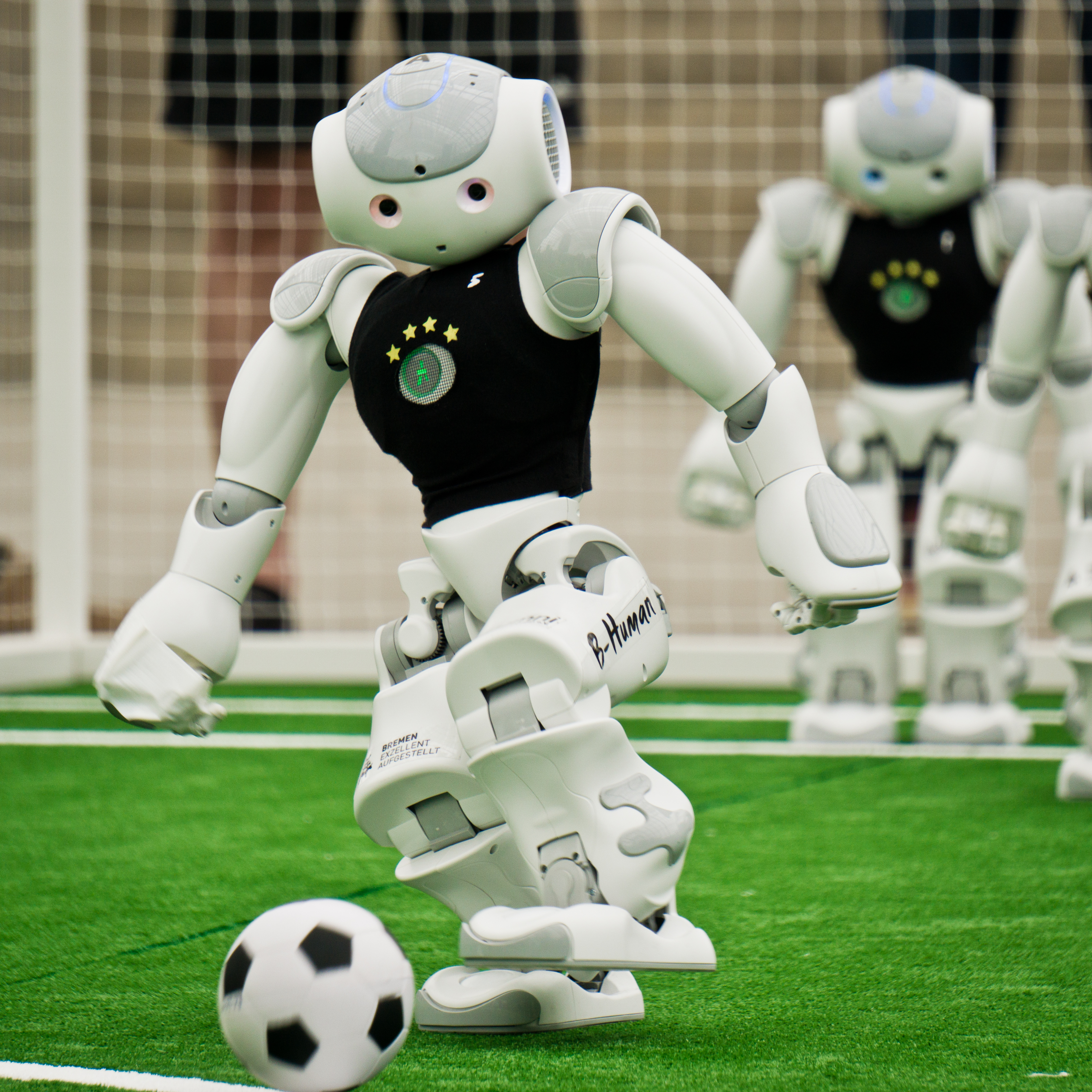
A Nao robot of the SPL team B-Human, RoboCup 2016 in Leipzig, Germany

The RoboCup Standard Platform League (SPL) is one of several leagues within RoboCup, an international competition with autonomous robotic soccer matches as the main event.

== Overview ==
In the Standard Platform League all teams use identical (i.e., standard) robots, allowing the teams concentrate on software development rather than the mechanics of robots. The robots operate fully autonomously; i.e., there is no remote control by either humans or computers during the games.

The League began as the Sony Four-Legged League in 1999 using the Sony AIBO. Initially a small number of teams were invited to join the league. In 2002, the league was opened and teams were allowed to apply through a qualification process. After Sony announced that it would discontinue production of the AIBO in 2006, the League searched for a new platform and decided on the Aldebaran Robotics humanoid NAO. In 2008, the League ran both AIBOs and Naos and was renamed the Standard Platform League. From 2009, only the Naos were used.

== History ==
=== Summaries of previous World Championships ===
Year (Robot)	Host	Final			Third Place Match			Number of Teams
Year (Robot)	Host	Winners	Score	Runners-up	Third Place	Score	Fourth Place	Number of Teams
1999 (AIBO)	Stockholm - Sweden	LRP; France	4-1	rUNSWift (UNSW Sydney); Australia	CMPack; United States			
2000 (AIBO)	Melbourne - Australia	rUNSWift (UNSW Sydney); Australia	10-0	LRP; France	CMPack; United States			
2001 (AIBO)	Seattle - USA	rUNSWift (UNSW Sydney); Australia	9-2	CMPack; United States				
2002 (AIBO)	Fukuoka/Busan - Japan/Korea	CMPack; United States	3-3 (2-1)	rUNSWift (UNSW Sydney); Australia	NUbots; Australia			
2003 (AIBO)	Padua - Italy	rUNSWift (UNSW Sydney); Australia	4-3	UPennalizers; United States	NUbots; Australia	4-1	CMPack; United States	
2004 (AIBO)	Lisbon - Portugal	GermanTeam; Germany	5-3	UTS Unleashed! Australia	NUbots; Australia	5-4	UPennalizers; United States	23
2005 (AIBO)	Osaka - Japan	GermanTeam; Germany	4-3 (2-2)	NUbots; Australia	rUNSWift (UNSW Sydney); Australia	8-0	CMDash; United States	24
2006 (AIBO)	Bremen - Germany	NUbots; Australia	7-3	rUNSWift (UNSW Sydney); Australia	Microsoft Hellhounds; Germany	6-0	GermanTeam; Germany	24
2007 (AIBO)	Atlanta - USA	Northern Bites; United States	5-1	NUbots; Australia	CMDash; United States	3-3 (6-5)	WrightEagle; China	24
2008 (AIBO)	Suzhou - China	GermanTeam; Germany	5-0	UTS-USTC WrightEagle Unleashed! China Australia	Northern Bites; United States	3-1	UT Austin Villa; United States	10
2008 (Nao)		NUManoids; Australia Ireland	1-0 (0-0)	GTCMUnited; United States	Kouretes; Greece	1-0 (0-0)	Humboldt; Germany	15
2009 (Nao)	Graz - Austria	B-Human, Germany	5-0	Northern Bites; United States	Nao Devils Dortmund; Germany	4-1	UT Austin Villa; United States	24
2010 (Nao)	Singapore	B-Human, Germany	6-1	rUNSWift (UNSW Sydney); Australia	UT Austin Villa; United States	5-1	CMurfs; United States	23
2011 (Nao)	Istanbul - Turkey	B-Human, Germany	11-1	Nao Devils Dortmund; Germany	NTU Robot PAL; Republic of China	4-2	Nao-Team HTWK; Germany	27
2012 (Nao)	Mexico City - Mexico	UT Austin Villa; United States	4-2	B-Human, Germany	rUNSWift (UNSW Sydney); Australia	11-1	Nao-Team HTWK; Germany	25
2013 (Nao)	Eindhoven - The Netherlands	B-Human, Germany	6-2	Nao-Team HTWK, Germany	UT Austin Villa United States	4-0	rUNSWift (UNSW Sydney); Australia	22
2014 (Nao)	Joao Pessoa - Brazil	rUNSWift (UNSW Sydney); Australia	5-1	Nao-Team HTWK, Germany	B-Human, Germany	7-0	UChile Chile	20
2015 (Nao)	Hefei, China	UNSW Sydney; Australia	3-1	B-Human, Germany	Nao-Team HTWK, Germany	3-1	UChile Chile	20
2016 (Nao)	Leipzig, Germany	B-Human, Germany	3-0 (0-0)	UT Austin Villa; United States	Nao-Team HTWK, Germany	4-1	UChile Chile	24
2017 (Nao)	Nagoya, Japan	B-Human, Germany	2-1	Nao-Team HTWK, Germany	Nao Devils Dortmund Germany	6-2	UT Austin Villa; United States	24
2018 (Nao)	Montreal, Canada	Nao-Team HTWK, Germany	1-0	B-Human, Germany	TJArk, China	2-0	HULKs; Germany	21
2019 (Nao)	Sydney, Australia	B-Human, Germany	2-1	Nao-Team HTWK, Germany	rUNSWift (UNSW Sydney); Australia	11-2	Nao Devils Dortmund; Germany	20

=== Technical Challenges Results ===
Year (Robot)	Host	First	Second	Third
1999 (AIBO)	Stockholm - Sweden	rUNSWift Australia		
2000 (AIBO)	Melbourne - Australia	rUNSWift Australia		
2001 (AIBO)	Seattle - USA	rUNSWift Australia		
2002 (AIBO)	Fukuoka/Busan Japan/Korea	rUNSWift Australia		
2003 (AIBO)	Padua - Italy		rUNSWift Australia	
2004 (AIBO)	Lisbon - Portugal	UTS Unleashed! Australia	ARAIBO Japan	ASURA Japan
2005 (AIBO)	Osaka - Japan	Cerberus Turkey	NUBots Australia	ARAIBO Japan and GermanTeam Germany
2006 (AIBO)	Bremen - Germany	Microsoft Hellhounds Germany	ASURA Japan	Dutch AIBO Team Netherlands
2007 (AIBO)	Atlanta - USA	GermanTeam Germany	Jolly Pochie Japan	UT Austin Villa United States
2008 (AIBO)	Suzhou - China			
2008 (Nao)				
2009 (Nao)	Graz - Austria	B-Human Germany and Nao-Team HTWK Germany		Nao Devils Germany and Nao Team Humboldt Germany
2010 (Nao)	Singapore	rUNSWift Australia	UT Austin Villa United States	CMurfs United States
2011 (Nao)	Istanbul - Turkey	RoboEireann Ireland	Noxious-Kouretes United Kingdom and Greece	rUNSWift Australia
2012 (Nao)	Mexico City - Mexico	Nao Team Humboldt Germany	rUNSWift Australia	B-Human Germany
2013 (Nao)	Eindhoven - The Netherlands	B-Human Germany	Nao-Team HTWK Germany	Nao Devils Dortmund Germany and rUNSWift Australia
2014 (Nao)	Joao Pessoa - Brazil	B-Human Germany	Austrian Kangaroos Austria	HULKs Germany
2015 (Nao)	Hefei, China	B-Human Germany	Nao Devils Germany	WrightOcean China
2016 (Nao)	Leipzig, Germany	Nao Devils Germany	HULKs Germany	B-Human Germany

=== Drop-In Competition Results ===
Year	Host	First	Second	Third	Best Drop-In Only Team
2014	Joao Pessoa - Brazil	B-Human Germany	Nao-Team HTWK Germany	Nao Devils Dortmund Germany	UnBeatables Brazil
2015	Hefei, China	Nao-Team HTWK Germany	B-Human Germany	Nao Devils Dortmund Germany	UnBeatables Brazil
2016	Leipzig, Germany	B-Human Germany	Nao-Team HTWK Germany	UT Austin Villa United States	UnBeatables Brazil

=== League Photos ===
==== 2009 ====
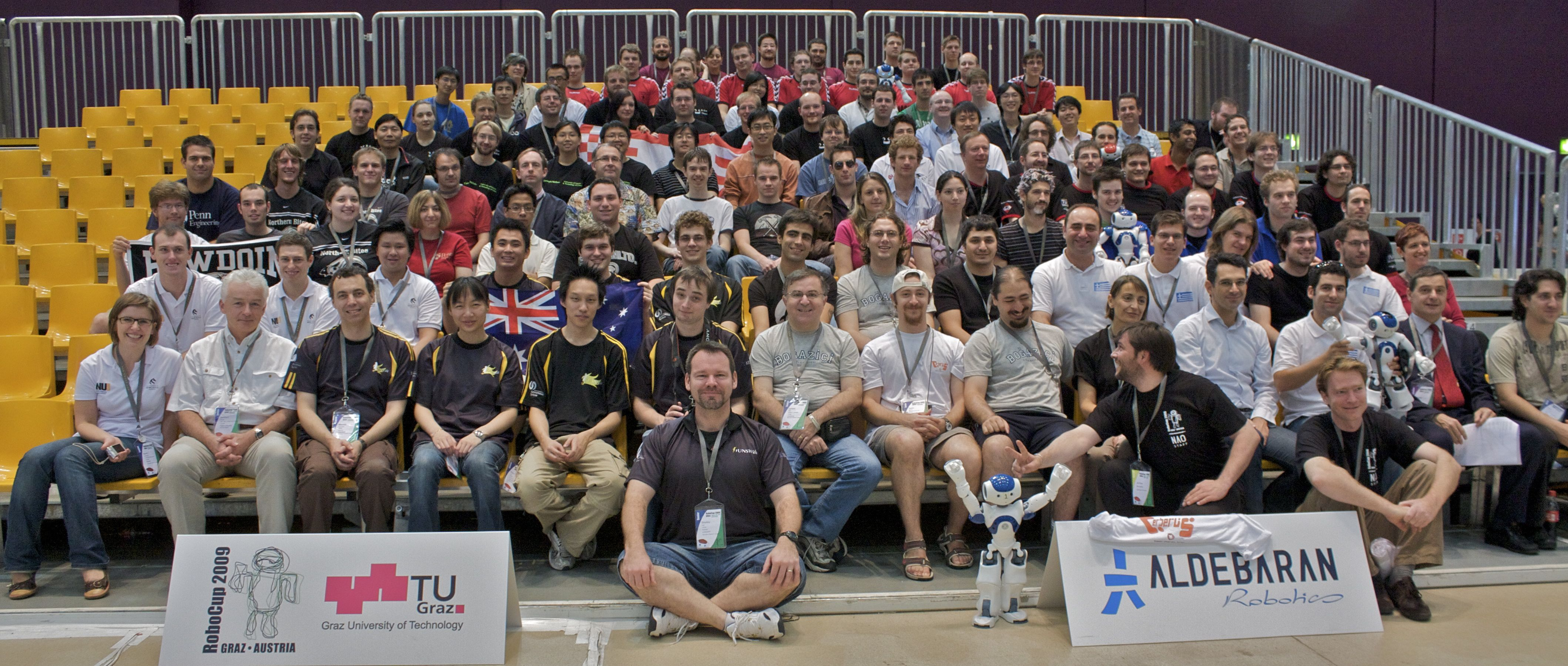
A group photo of all teams participating in RoboCup SPL 2009

==== 2010 ====
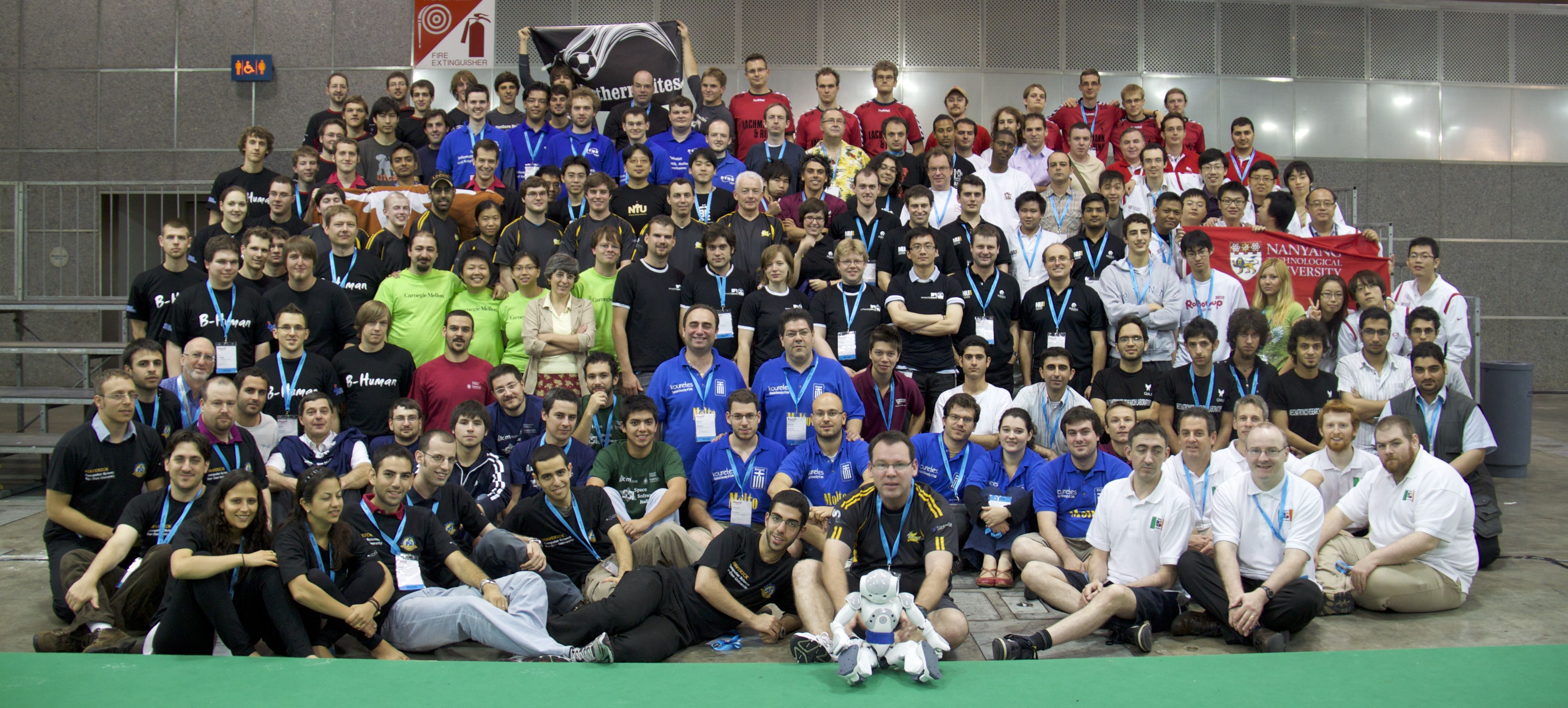
A group photo of all teams participating in RoboCup SPL 2010

==== 2011 ====
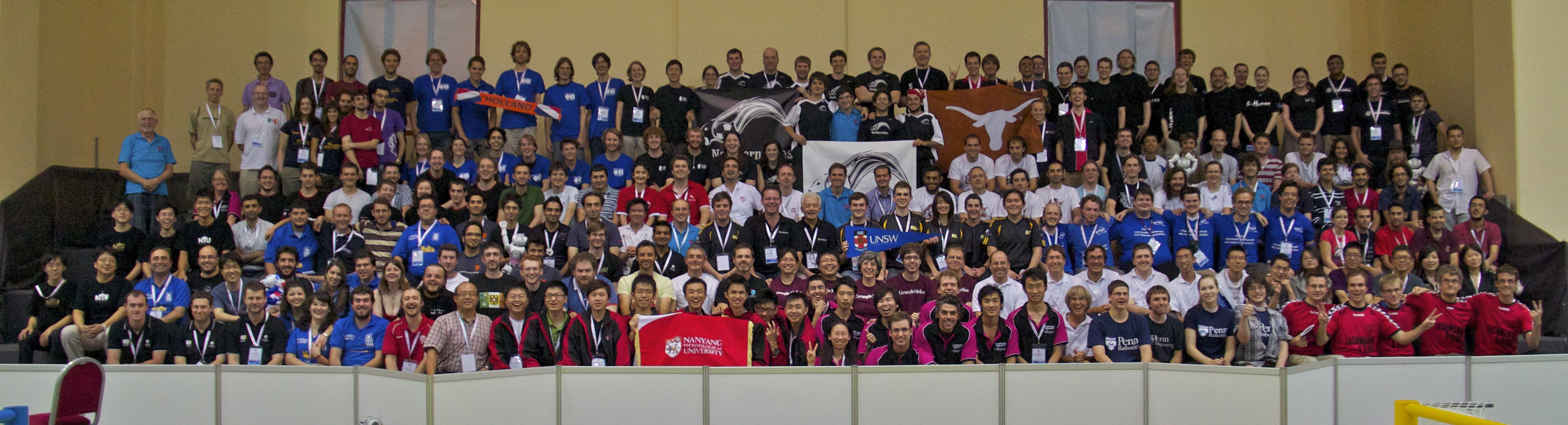
A group photo of all teams participating in RoboCup SPL 2011

==== 2012 ====
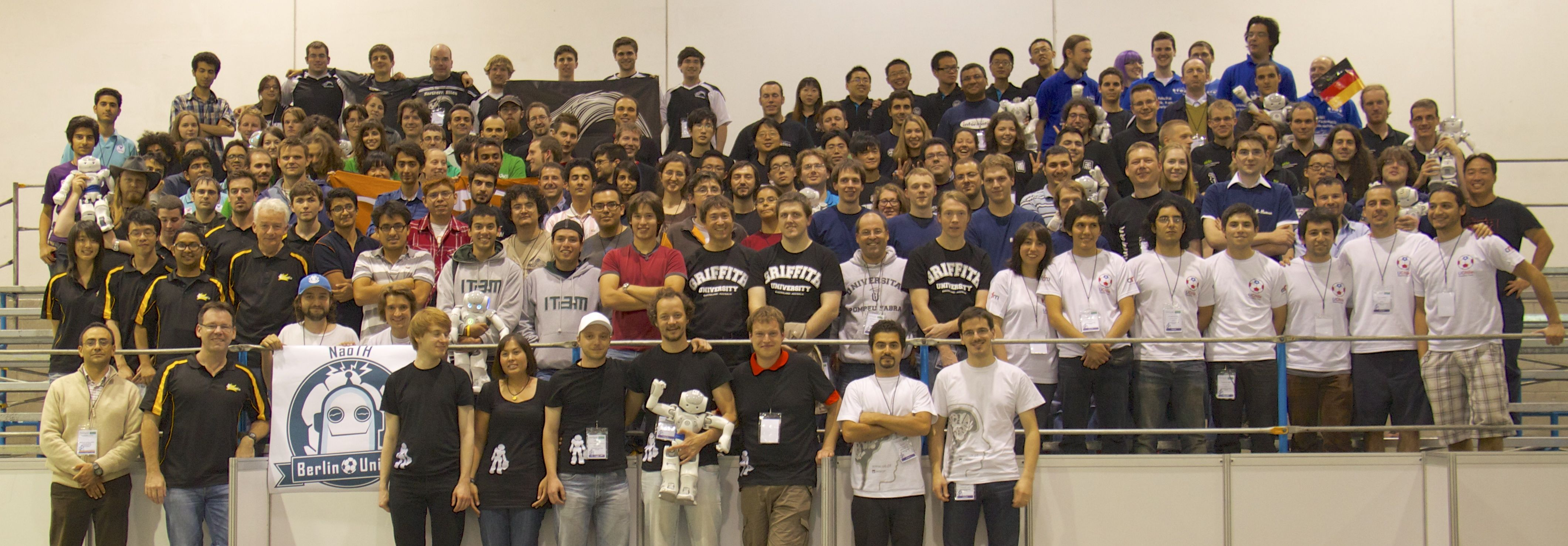
A group photo of all teams participating in RoboCup SPL 2012

==== 2013 ====
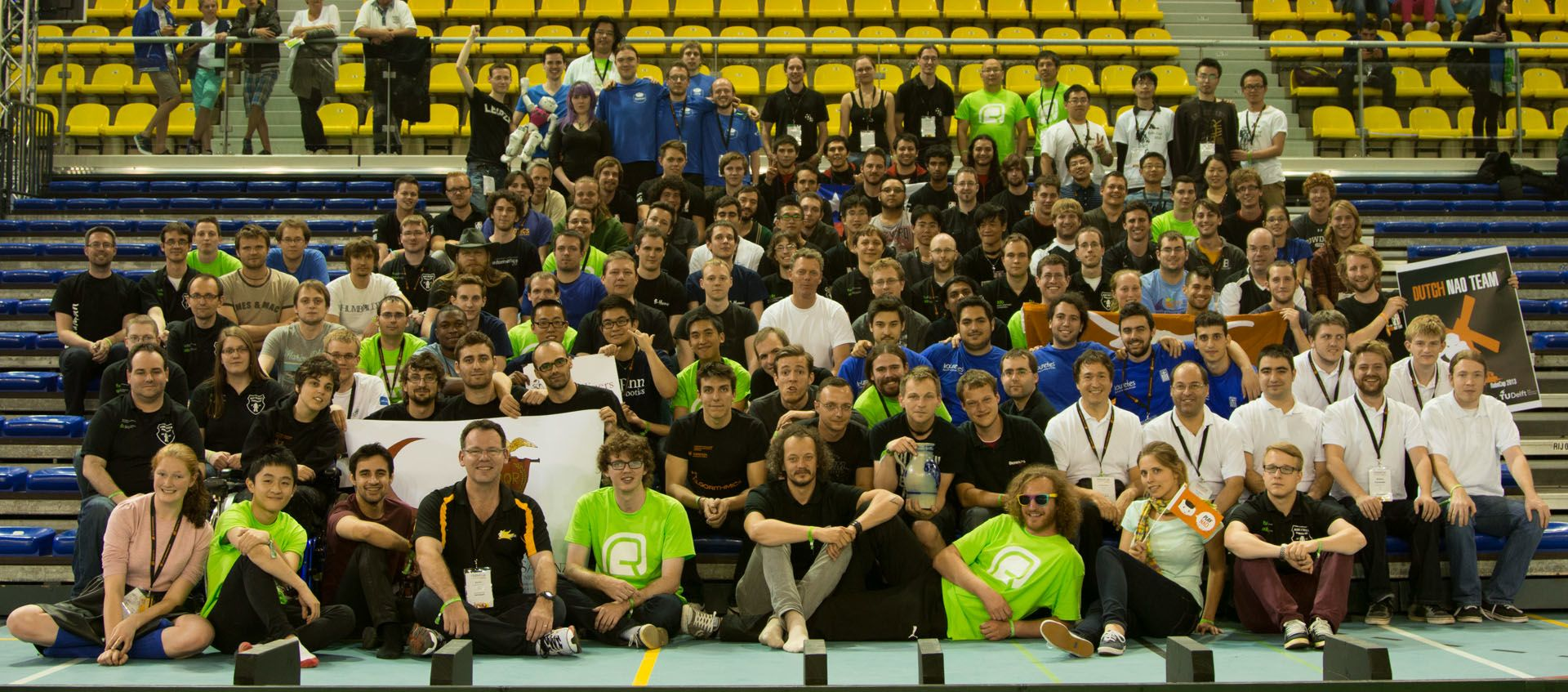
A group photo of all teams participating in RoboCup SPL 2013
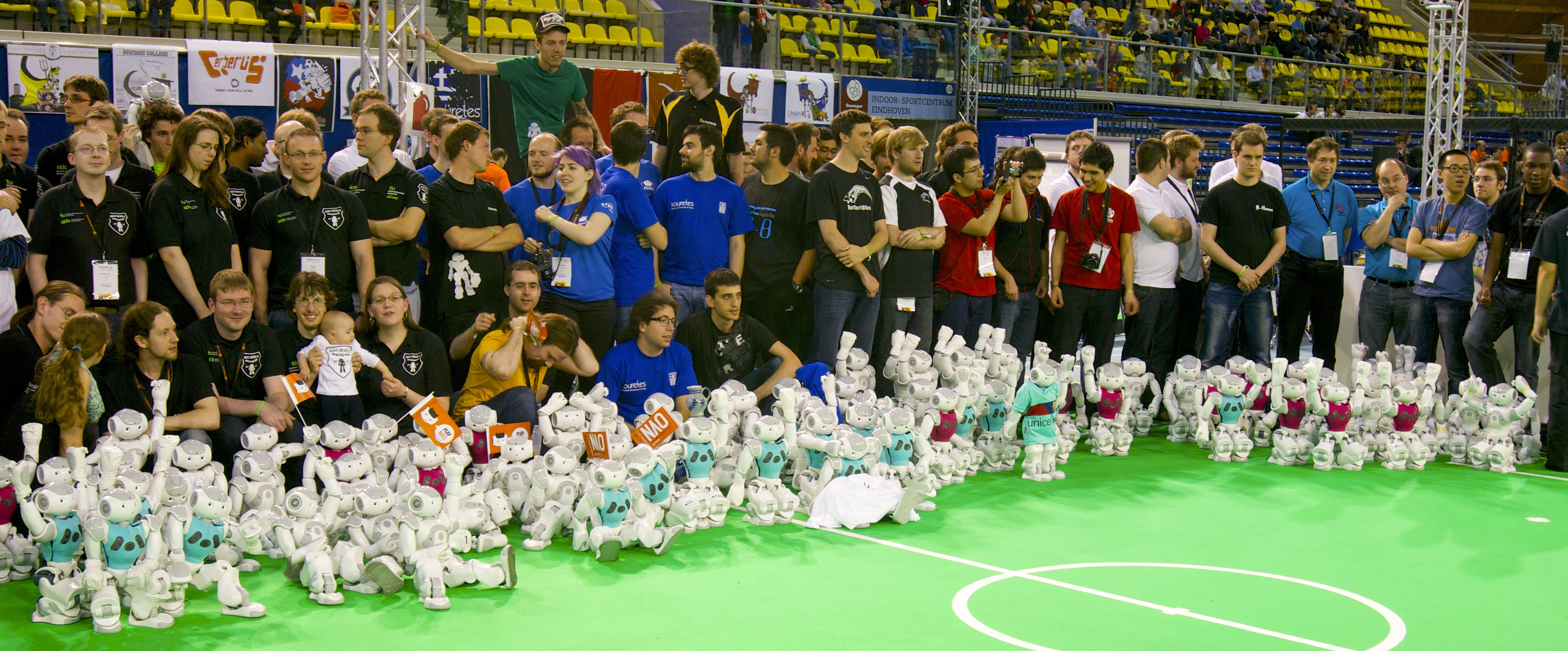
Robots on display for the Queen of The Netherlands at RoboCup 2013

==== 2014 ====
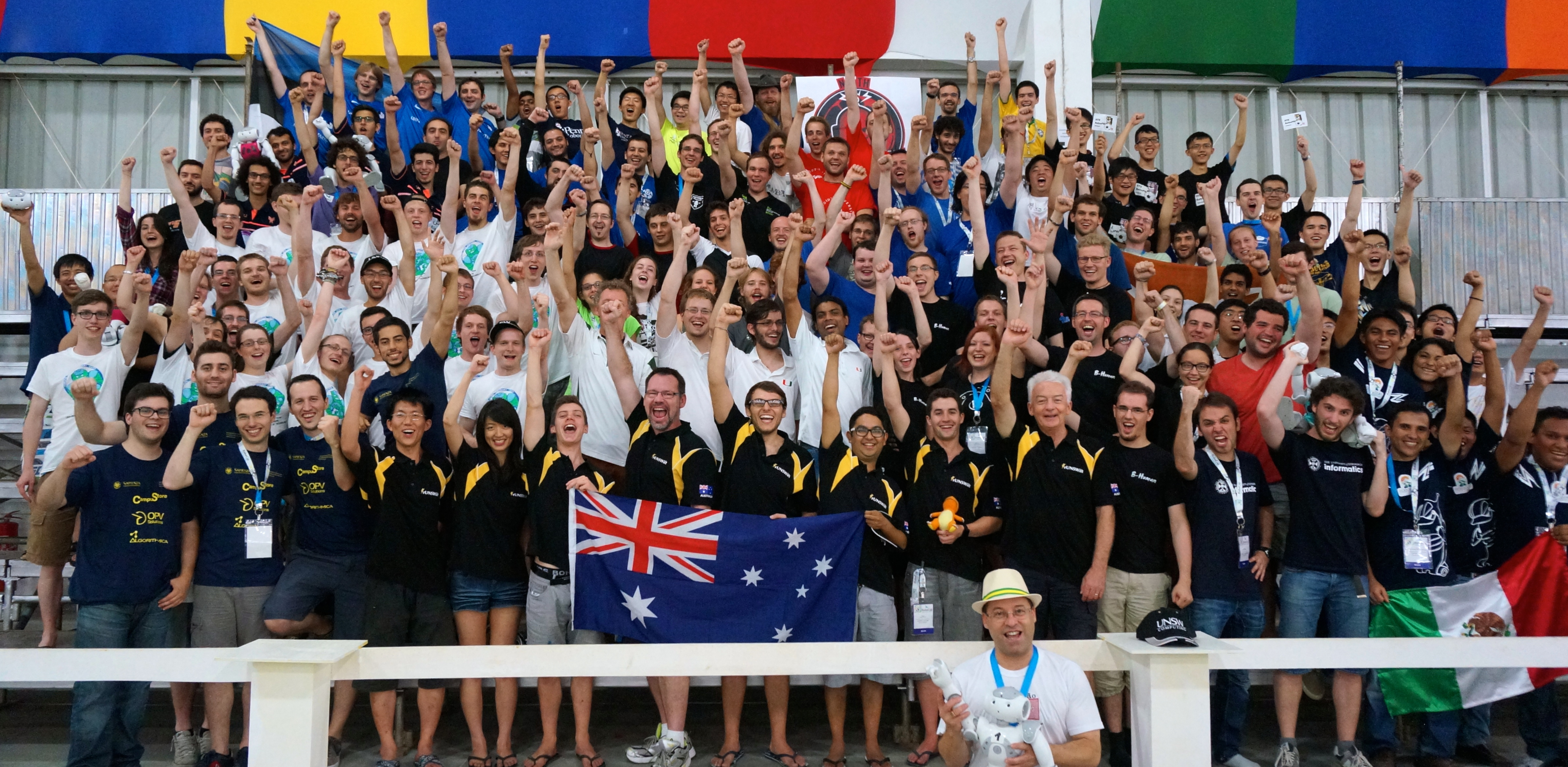
A group photo of all teams participating in RoboCup SPL 2014

=== Founders of the League ===
- Hiroaki Kitano, RoboCup Federation
- Manuela Veloso, Carnegie Mellon University, USA
- Masahiro Fujita, Sony Corporation, Japan
- Minoru Asada, Osaka University, Japan
- Dominique Duhaut, Université de Bretagne Sud, France

== Rules ==
- RoboCup SPL Rules

Year	Robots	Team size	Field Size	Walls	Beacons	Ball	Goals	Lighting
1999	AIBO ERS-110	3	180 cm × 280 cm	Yes	6	Orange	Blue & Yellow	Even & Bright
2000	AIBO ERS-110	3	180 cm × 280 cm	Yes	6	Orange	Blue & Yellow	Even & Bright
2001	AIBO ERS-210	3	180 cm × 280 cm	Yes	6	Orange	Blue & Yellow	Even & Bright
2002	AIBO ERS-210	4	270 cm × 420 cm	Yes	6	Orange	Blue & Yellow	Even & Bright
2003	AIBO ERS-210A SuperCore	4	270 cm × 420 cm	Yes	6	Orange	Blue & Yellow	Even & Bright
2004	AIBO ERS-7	4	270 cm × 420 cm	Yes	4	Orange	Blue & Yellow	Even & Bright
2005	AIBO ERS-7	4	400 cm x 600 cm	No	4	Orange	Blue & Yellow	Even & Bright
2006	AIBO ERS-7	4	400 cm x 600 cm	No	4	Orange	Blue & Yellow	Even & Bright
2007	AIBO ERS-7	4	400 cm x 600 cm	No	4	Orange	Blue & Yellow	Even & Bright
2008	AIBO ERS-7	5	400 cm x 600 cm	No	2	Orange	Blue & Yellow	Even & Bright
2008	NAO V2	2	440 cm x 680 cm	No	0	Orange	Blue & Yellow	Even & Bright
2009	NAO V3	3	540 cm x 740 cm	No	0	Orange	Blue & Yellow	Even & Bright
2010	NAO V3 Plus	3	540 cm x 740 cm	No	0	Orange	Blue & Yellow	Even & Bright
2011	Nao V3.3	4	540 cm x 740 cm	No	0	Orange	Blue & Yellow	Even & Bright
2012	Nao 4	4	540 cm x 740 cm	No	0	Orange	Yellow	Even & Bright
2013	Nao 4	5	600 cm x 900 cm	No	0	Orange	Yellow	Even & Bright
2014	Nao 4 or Nao 5	5 + Coach	600 cm x 900 cm	No	0	Orange	Yellow	Even & Bright
2015	Nao 4 or Nao 5	5 + Coach	600 cm x 900 cm	No	0	Orange	White	Even & Bright
2016	Nao 4 or Nao 5	5 + Coach	600 cm x 900 cm	No	0	Black and White	White	Even & Bright
2017	Nao 4 or Nao 5	5 + Coach	600 cm x 900 cm	No	0	Black and White	White	Natural elements
2018	Nao 4 or Nao 5	5	600 cm x 900 cm	No	0	Black and White	White	Natural elements
2019	Nao 6 or earlier	5	600 cm x 900 cm	No	0	Black and White	White	Natural elements

=== Robots ===
1999–2008 Sony AIBO.

2008–present Aldebaran Robotics humanoid NAO robots.

== Technologies ==
Control of the robots relies on several areas of robotics, including

- Adaptive control
- Artificial Intelligence
- Bayesian Learning Learning
- Classification and Clustering
- Computational Neuroscience
- Data Mining Techniques
- Digital Control
- Digital Image Processing
- Dimension reduction
- Evolutionary Computation
- Kalman Filter, Extended Kalman Filter
- Flexible Distribution functions
- Feedback Control and Regulation
- Manifold learning
- Motor Control and Legged Locomotion
- Neural Networks
- Reinforcement Learning
- Robot Programming
- Software Engineering
- Support Vector Machines
- Machine vision

== See also ==
- Nao (robot)
- AIBO
