= Search and rescue robot =

Robot designed for rescuing people

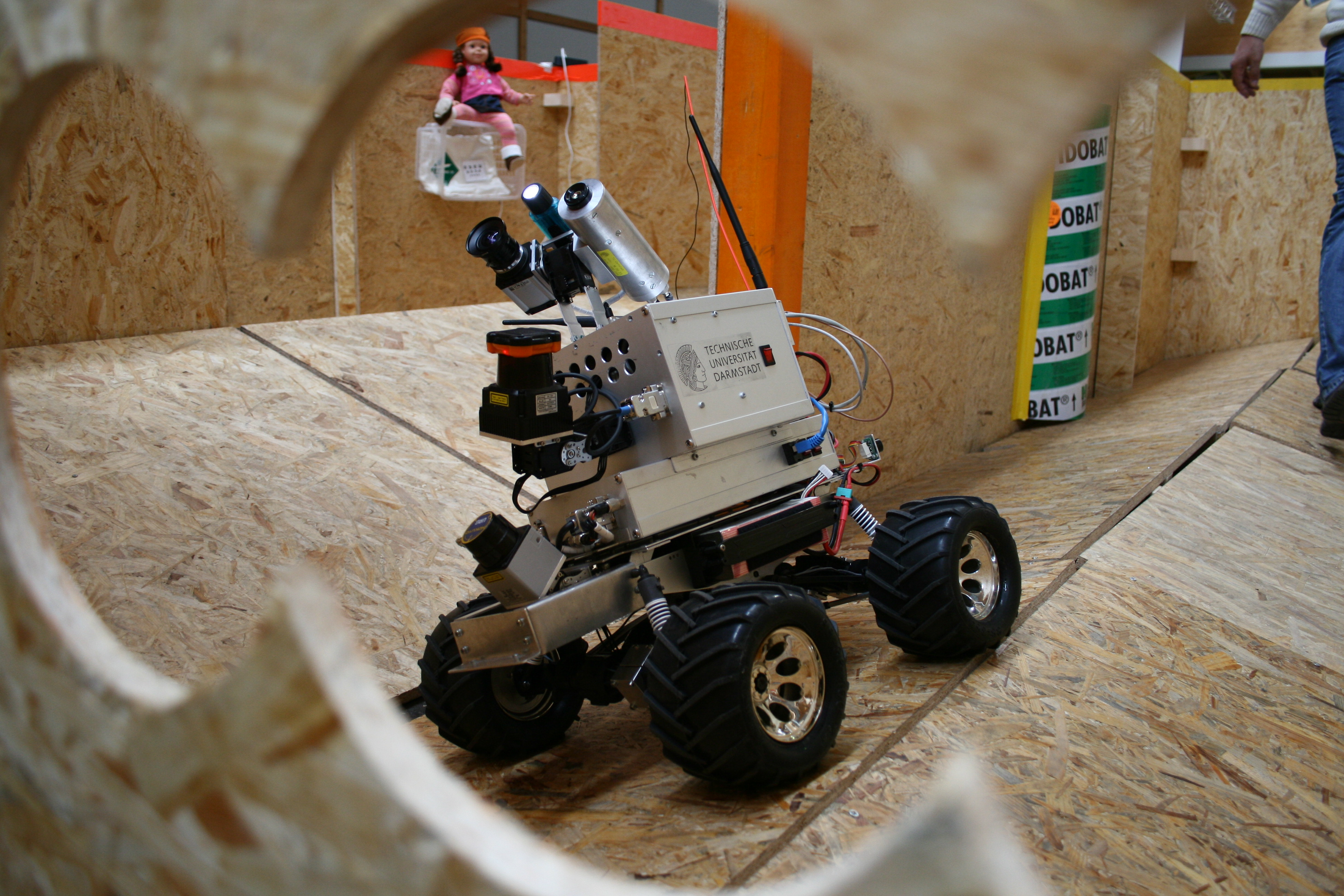
Hector robot from Darmstadt Rescue Robot Team identifies a victim at the 2010 RoboCup German Open.

A search and rescue robot are used to assist search and rescue efforts by searching, mapping, removing rubble, delivering supplies, providing medical treatment, and evacuating casualties.

Rescue robots were used in the rescue and response efforts for the September 11 attacks and the 2016 Central Italy earthquake, albeit with varying results. There are several projects, such as TRADR and SHERPA, dedicated to further developing and improving search and rescue robot technology.

== Uses ==
=== 9/11 ===
Rescue robots were used in the search for victims and survivors after the September 11 attacks in New York.

During September 11 disasters rescue robots were first really tested. They were sent into the rubble to look for survivors and bodies. The robots had trouble working in the rubble of the World Trade Center and were constantly getting stuck or broken. Since then many new ideas have been formed about rescue robots. Engineers and scientists are trying to change the shapes of the robots and take them from wheels to no wheels. “Strong government funding and support is needed if search and rescued robots are to see widespread use in fewer than 14 years.” This means that without the help of government the technology for these devices are not available or they cost too much. These robots are very important in disaster scenarios and are hopefully taking a change for the better.

== Robots ==
=== Aerial ===
These types of robots help in various rescue operations from the air

=== Bio-inspired ===
- Daniel Goldman, a biophysicist at Georgia Tech, has started building a robot that Piore says “is less like an ATV and more like a sandfish lizard”. Goldman has been spending a lot of time researching and studying the movements of sandfish lizards and trying to develop that into his own robotic idea. Piore states that his robot will be able to “burrow deeper or snake its way back to the surface”. just like a sandfish lizard. This will be helpful in many disaster scenarios. Goldman is trying to develop this robot to be able to maneuver through such terrain as rubble, like in the World Trade Center disaster.
- Murphy states that most rescue robots are not tested in real life situations and more in a situation that the robot can handle. The possible solutions to these problems are what an associate professor of robotics- Howie Choset, is working on. Choset is working on building a “snake robot”. These snake robots are “thin, legless devices with multiple joints”. These snake robots will be used to go places where normal wheeled robots cannot go. The technology still needs some work and the trials they are going through with them aren't going perfect. Most tests and studies are helping Choset out and are improving these snake robots. “More animal studies would help” says Choset. The robot is based on snakes and their movements, but considering that snakes are made up of 200 bones and the robot is made up of 15 links, there are problems in functionality.

== Search and Rescue Projects ==
=== TRADR ===
Using a proven-in-practice user-centric design methodology, TRADR develops novel science and technology for human-robot teams to assist in urban search and rescue disaster response efforts, which stretch over multiple sorties in missions that may take several days or weeks. The novel technology makes the experience during robot-assisted response to an emergency persistent. Various kinds of robots collaborate with human team members to explore or search the disaster environment, and gather physical samples from the incident site. Throughout this collaborative effort, TRADR enables the team to gradually develop its understanding of the disaster area over multiple, possibly asynchronous sorties (persistent environment models), to improve team members’ understanding of how to work in the area (persistent multi-robot action models), and to improve team-work (persistent human-robot teaming). TRADR focuses on an industrial accident scenario, but the technology is equally applicable for using robots in other disaster, emergency and urban search and rescue (USAR) scenarios, such as earthquake relief, as the TRADR deployment of robots in Amatrice, Italy, on September 1, 2016, shows.

=== SHERPA ===
The goal of SHERPA is to develop a mixed ground and aerial robotic platform to support search and rescue activities in a real-world hostile environment like the alpine scenario.

The technological platform and the alpine rescuing scenario are the occasion to address a number of research topics about cognition and control pertinent to the call.

What makes the project potentially very rich from a scientific viewpoint is the heterogeneity and the capabilities to be owned by the different actors of the SHERPA system: the "human" rescuer is the "busy genius", working in team with the ground vehicle, as the "intelligent donkey", and with the aerial platforms, i.e. the "trained wasps" and "patrolling hawks". Indeed, the research activity focuses on how the "busy genius" and the "SHERPA animals" interact and collaborate with each other, with their own features and capabilities, toward the achievement of a common goal.

A mix of advanced control and cognitive capabilities characterize the SHERPA system, aiming to support the rescuer by improving his awareness of the rescue scene even in tough environments and with the "genius" often "busy" in the rescuing activity (and thus unable to supervise the platform). Thus emphasis is placed on robust autonomy of the platform, acquisition of cognitive capabilities, collaboration strategies, natural and implicit interaction between the "genius" and the "SHERPA animals", which motivate the research activity.

=== ICARUS ===
The introduction of unmanned Search and Rescue devices can offer a valuable tool to save human lives and to speed up the Search And Rescue (SAR) process. ICARUS concentrates on the development of unmanned SAR technologies for detecting, locating and rescuing humans.

There is a vast literature on research efforts towards the development of unmanned Search and Rescue tools. However, this research effort stands in contrast to the practical reality in the field, where unmanned search and rescue tools have great difficulty finding their way to the end-users.

The ICARUS project addresses these issues, aiming to bridge the gap between the Research community and end-users, by developing a toolbox of integrated components for unmanned Search and Rescue.

After the earthquakes in l’Aquila, Haiti and Japan, the European Commission confirmed that there exists a large discrepancy between (robotic) technology which is developed in laboratory and the use of such technology on the terrain for Search and Rescue (SAR) operations and crisis management. Thus, the European Commission's Directorate-General for Enterprise and Industry decided to fund ICARUS, a Research project (global budget: 17.5M€) which aims to develop robotic tools which can assist “human” crisis intervention teams.

=== DARPA Robotics Challenge (DRC) ===
The Department of Defense's strategic plan calls for the Joint Force to conduct humanitarian, disaster relief, and related operations. Some disasters, due to grave risks to the health and wellbeing of rescue and aid workers, prove too great in scale or scope for timely and effective human response. The DARPA Robotics Challenge (DRC) seeks to address this problem by promoting innovation in human-supervised robotic technology for disaster-response operations.

The primary technical goal of the DRC is to develop human-supervised ground robots capable of executing complex tasks in dangerous, degraded, human-engineered environments. Competitors in the DRC are developing robots that can utilize standard tools and equipment commonly available in human environments, ranging from hand tools to vehicles.

To achieve its goal, the DRC is advancing the state of the art of supervised autonomy, mounted and dismounted mobility, and platform dexterity, strength, and endurance. Improvements in supervised autonomy, in particular, aim to enable better control of robots by non-expert supervisors and allow effective operation despite degraded communications (low bandwidth, high latency, intermittent connection).

=== R4 Program ===
Rescue Robots for Research and Response (R4) Program was a three-year long grant starting in 2003. This grant connects scientists and companies working in the field of rescue robotics with rescue experts and test sites, with the goal of identifying issues within rescue robots' design.

Hosted by the University of South Florida as a part of the R4 Program on 2003, August 2, 15 scientists met with the Federal Emergency Management Agency's Indiana Task Force 1 (IN-TF1) in Lebanon, Indiana outside the town's abandoned library to test robots. To create a test site, mannequins were placed inside part of the library, the library was then demolished. Participants watched and learned as IN-TF1 cleared the rooms before then clearing them out themselves. Throughout the event, 4 Robots were tested, for a total of 10 hours of robot activity between them. This event lasted for 27 hours. Perception, and communication were both identified as issues during the tests. Many participants missed mannequins because of the dark and also due to the narrow field of view and odd placement of the sensors. Robots were also difficult to control and screens were difficult to see because of the personal protective equipment worn. Wireless robots disconnected often when traversing through rubble, and voice commanded robots would often not work because of the background noise.

== See also ==
- Search and rescue
- Rescue robot competition
