= RoboCup Small Size League =

Robotics competition league

The RoboCup Small Size League (SSL) is a RoboCup soccer league.

== Old format ==
Two teams of six robots which are limited to an 18 cm diameter and 15 cm height play soccer with an orange golf ball. They are identified and tracked by four overhead cameras connected to an off-field computer. The field size is 9metersx6meters. Then robots' and balls' status including their position and id are sent to teams' computers. Their AI software sends commands to the robots based on the vision data.

== New format ==
As of 2018, there are now two divisions, the B division that continued to use the same parameters as before (6 robots, 9x6 meter field, etc) and the A division that changed a lot of parameters. This change was brought to improve the tournament experience by making the more experienced teams face each other while letting the newer teams improve their algorithms with more balanced face offs.

=== Division A new parameters ===
- A software referee now calls automatically the penalties and a human referee only supervises the calls and corrects them if need be.
- Robots are fully autonomous, they have to place the ball where the auto referee commands (when the ball leaves the field for example)
- Field is now 12x9 meters.
- Games oppose 2 teams of 11 robots. (Prior to 2021 it was 8 vs. 8)

== Small Size teams ==
Team	Country
Anorak	Pakistan
Austrian Cubes	Austria
B-Smart	Germany
Botnia	Finland
CMDragons	United States
Cyrus	Iran
Eagle Knights	Mexico
ER-Force	Germany
Fantasia	China
Farzanegan	Iran
FURGBol	Brazil
GEAR - USP	Brazil
Immortals	Iran
KgpKubs	India
Khainui	Thailand
KIKS	Japan
KN2C	Iran
luhbots	Germany
MRL	Iran
NEUIslanders	Northern Cyprus
Omid	Iran
Parsian	Iran
Plasma-Z	Thailand
RFC Cambridge	United States
RoboCats	United States
RoboDragons	Japan
RoboFEI	Brazil
RoboIME	Brazil
RoboJackets	United States
RoboPET	Brazil
RoboTeam Twente	Netherlands
Salam	Saudi Arabia
SeeGoals	Sweden
Skuba	Thailand
Small Size Holland	Netherlands
SPbUnited	Russia
STOx's	Colombia
Strive	China
Thunderbots FC	Canada
ULtron	Canada
TIGERs Mannheim	Germany
UMass Minutebots	United States
Warthog Robotics	Brazil
Wright Eagle	China
ZJUNlict	China
