= Qfix robot kit =

Educational robotics set

Qfix robot kits are an education tool for teaching robotics. They are used in schools, high schools and mechatronics training in companies. The robot kits are also used by hobby robot builders. The qfix kits are often found in the RoboCup Junior competition where soccer robots are built of the kit's components.

== Mechanics ==
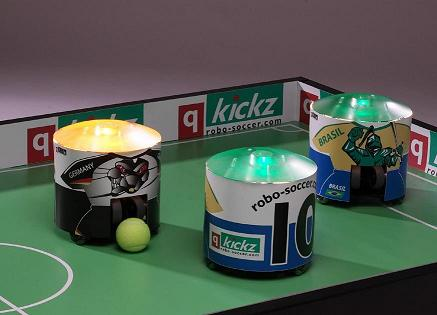
Qfix robots in a soccer match

Like Lego mindstorms, it is a robot kit consisting of mechanical parts, a controller, different sensors and actuators, and a software environment to program the constructed robot.

Unlike Lego, in qfix the mechanical parts are made of aluminium. Mechanical elements include bars and plates, mounts for motors and sensors, axes and wheels.

== Electronics ==
The qfix controller boards consist of an Atmel AVR controller plus motor drivers, analog and digital input ports, LEDs, buttons, and an I²C bus. The bus is used to connect further PCBs like LCD, stronger motor drivers or special sensors.

== Software ==
The qfix kits come with the free C++ environment WinAVR for Atmel AVR controllers. Additionally, there is a C++ class library handling all qfix controller board functionalities. Programs can be downloaded to the controller boards via parallel or USB link using the avrdude tool.

Graphical programming is also supported by using qfix GRAPE (graphical programming environment). With this software, first a flowchart is designed and then the behavior of all flowchart elements is defined.
