= Hiroaki Kitano =

Japanese scientist (born 1961)

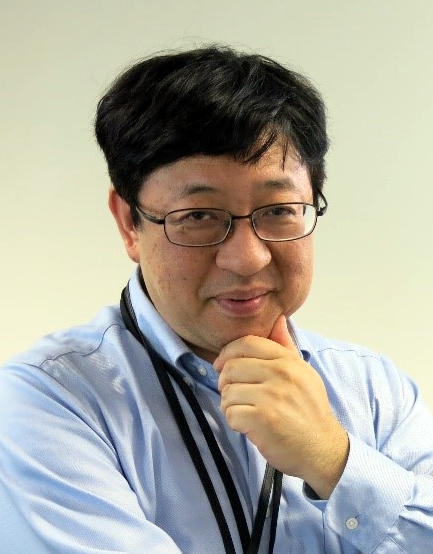
- Kitano in 2021
- Born: 1961 (age 64–65)
- Education: International Christian University; Kyoto University
- Known for: AIBO; Robocup
- Awards: IJCAI Computers and Thought Award (1993)
- Scientific career
- Fields: Systems Biology
- Workplaces: Sony Computer Science Laboratories, Inc.; Carnegie Mellon University; Okinawa Institute of Science and Technology (OIST); RIKEN; The Systems Biology Institute (SBI)
- Thesis: Speech-to-speech translation: a massively parallel memory-based approach (1991)
- Website: www.sbi.jp/about-us/members

Hiroaki Kitano (北野 宏明; born 1961 in Tokyo) is a Japanese scientist, head of the Systems Biology Institute, Senior Executive Vice President and Chief Technology Officer of the Sony Group Corporation, Chief Executive Officer of Sony Research Inc. and Sony Computer Science Laboratories, Inc.; a Group Director of the Laboratory for Disease Systems Modeling at and RIKEN Center for Integrative Medical Sciences; and a professor at Okinawa Institute of Science and Technology (OIST). Kitano is known for developing AIBO, and the robotic world cup tournament known as Robocup.

== Education ==
Kitano graduated from International Christian University with a B.A. in physics in 1984. He received a PhD in computer science from Kyoto University in 1991. His PhD thesis in machine translation was titled "Speech-to-speech translation: a massively parallel memory-based approach". His work includes a broad spectrum of publications in artificial intelligence and interactomics.

== Research ==
From 1988 to 1994, Kitano was a visiting researcher at the Center for Machine Translation at Carnegie Mellon University.

At Sony, Kitano started the development of the AIBO robotic pet. This research was developed further as the QRIO, a bipedal humanoid robot. The research behind AIBO and QRIO led to Kitano founding the RoboCup annual international robotics competition in 1997. The goal of RoboCup is to create a team of autonomous robotic footballers that would be able to beat the best team in the world, by 2050.

Kitano has made significant contributions to Systems biology, including a contribution to the Systems Biology Markup Language (SBML).

== Roles and awards ==
Kitano has served as a scientific advisor for a number of companies, including Alstom, Segway Japan and Mitsubishi Chemical Holdings. He was awarded the IJCAI Computers and Thought Award in 1993 and the Nature Award for Creative Mentoring in Science in 2009. He was elected a Fellow of the Association for the Advancement of Artificial Intelligence in 2021.
