= GRAPE =

GRAPE, or GRAphics Programming Environment is a software development environment for mathematical visualization, especially differential geometry and continuum mechanics. In 1994, it won the European Academic Software Award.

The term graphical refers to the applications; the programming itself is mostly based on C. GRAPE was developed by the University of Bonn in Germany and is available for free for non-commercial purposes. It has not been developed actively since 1998.

== qfix Grape ==
Another graphical programming environment called GRAPE is developed by qfix and the University of Ulm. Here, it is used as a graphical tool for developing object oriented programs for controlling autonomous mobile robots. After arranging graphical program entities to receive the desired flow chart, the graphical program can be translated to source code (e.g. C++). A modular interface makes the environment easy to extend, so additional classes can be integrated or different flowchart-to-code translator or compilers can be used.
