= Robocup Rescue Simulation =

Robocup Rescue Simulation is an education and research project intended to promote the development of robotic agents for search and rescue. The project was initiated in reaction to the Great Hanshin earthquake, which hit Hyōgo Prefecture, Japan, on 17 January 1995, killing more than six thousand people, most of them in the city of Kobe.

According to event organizers, "The intention of the RoboCup Rescue project is to promote research and development in this socially significant domain at various levels involving multi-agent team work coordination, physical robotic agents for search and rescue, information infrastructures, personal digital assistants, a standard simulator and decision support systems, evaluation benchmarks for rescue strategies and robotic systems that [can] all [be] integrated into comprehensive systems in future."

The RoboCup Rescue Simulation Project challenges teams of researchers to design virtual robots to solve various challenges, or to build real, autonomous robots, which are evaluated in specially designed rescue simulations.

The project is one of several competitions operated by RoboCup, which is best known for the Robot Soccer World Cup.
