= RoboCup Middle Size League =

Robotics competition league

Final match of RoboCup 2013 in Eindhoven, second goal by Tech United.

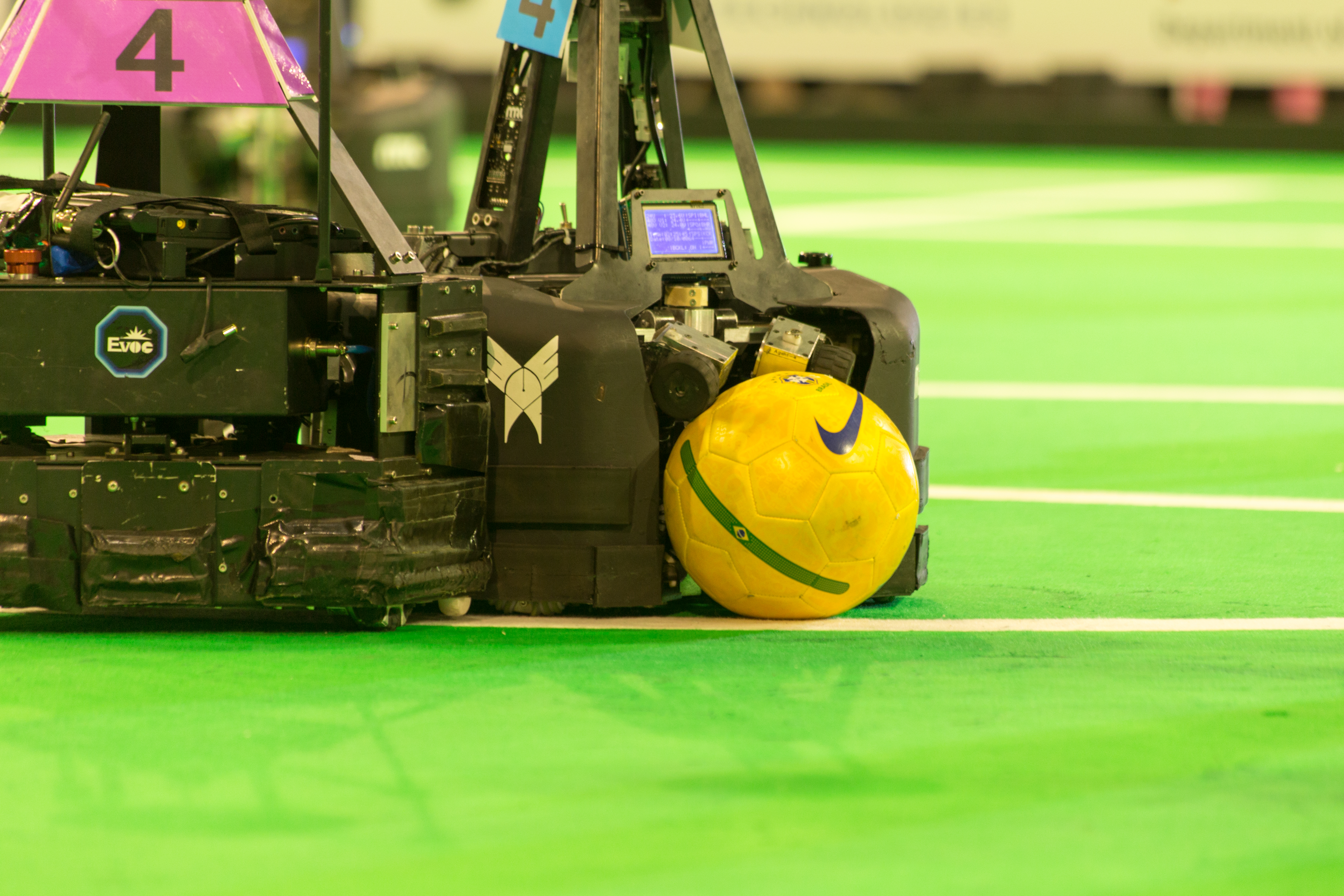
Robots of team MRL and team Water.

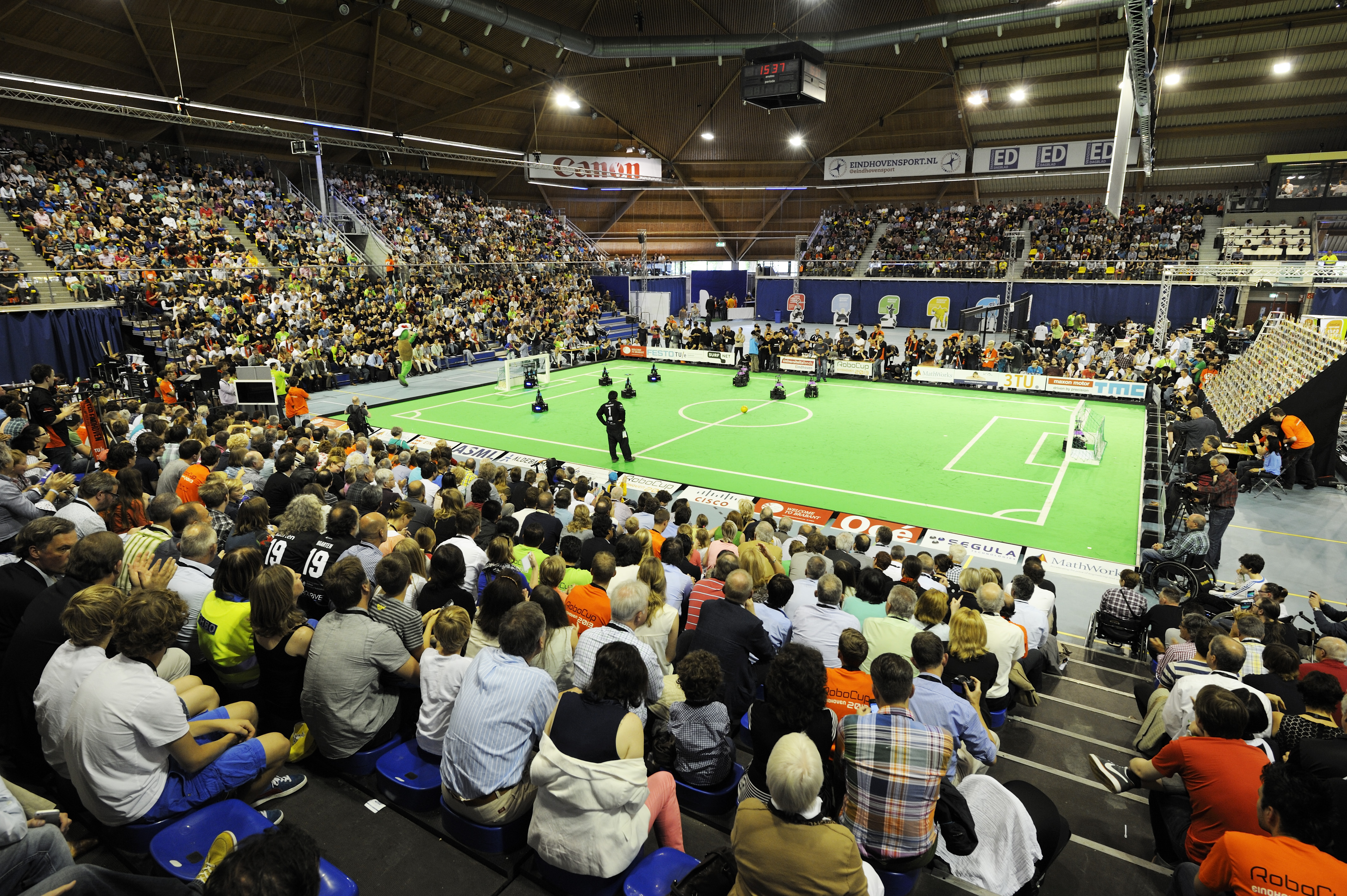
Final match of RoboCup 2013 in Eindhoven. Photo by Bart van Overbeeke.

Brainstormers Tribots (from Universität Osnabrück) play RFC Stuttgart (from Universität Stuttgart) during the RoboCup German Open of 2009.

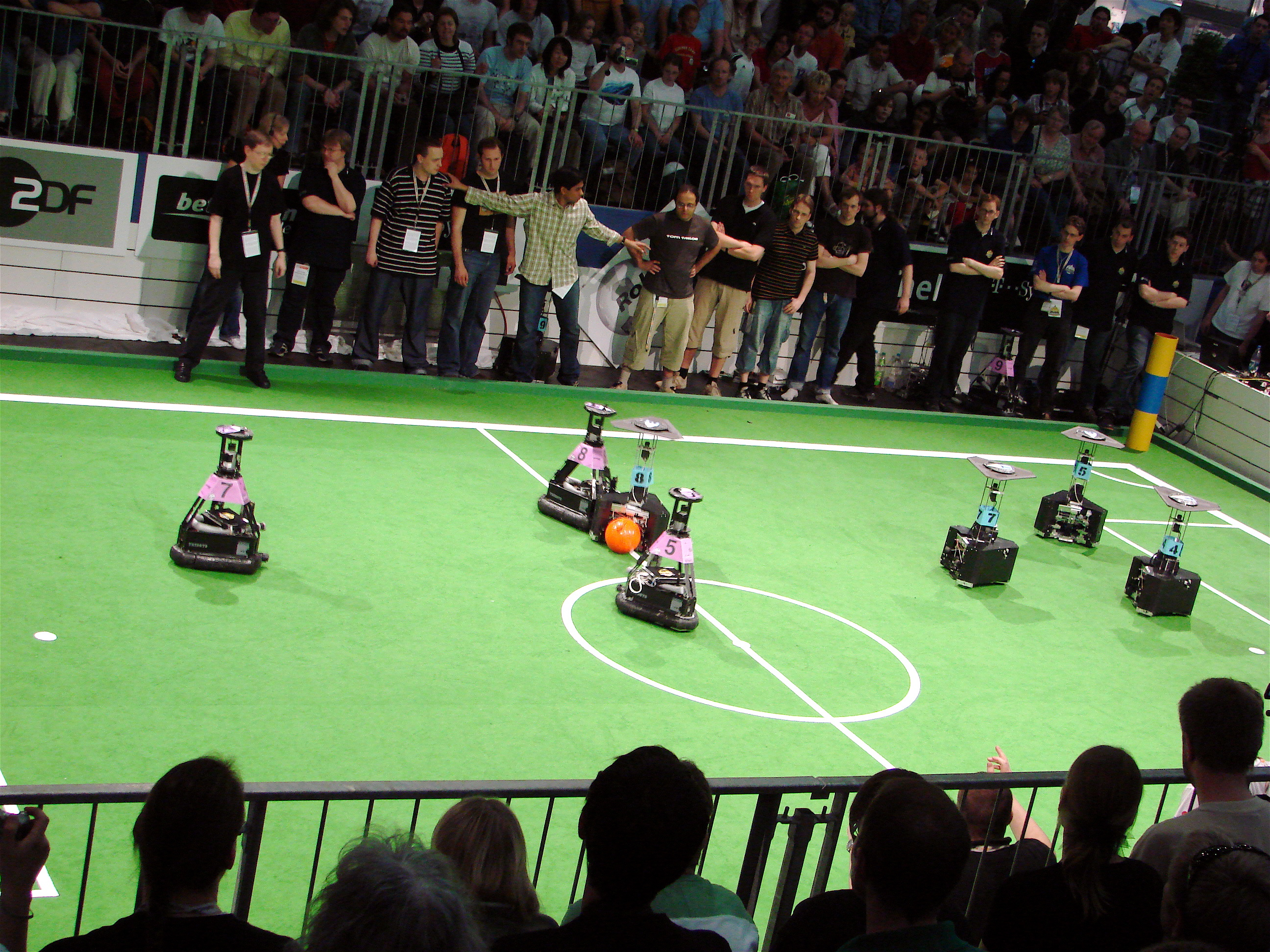
Final match of RoboCup MSL in 2006.

As one of the founding leagues of the international RoboCup initiative, the RoboCup Middle Size League (MSL) robot soccer competition has been organised from 1997 onwards. On an indoor soccer field, with goals of reduced size, teams of five fully autonomous soccer playing robots compete against one another. No human intervention is allowed during a match, except to take robots on or from the field. Although limitations with respect to maximum size and weight are in place, teams are completely free to design both hardware and software.

== Rulebook ==
As much as possible, rules are the same as the laws of human football. An official FIFA approved ball is used in matches, and rules with respect to tackles and controlling the ball apply to robot soccer similar to their equivalent rules in human soccer. Modifications with respect to the FIFA rulebook are the field dimensions, which are reduced to 12 m by 18 m, and the number of players per team, which is five in RoboCup MSL.

Starting during RoboCup 2012 in Mexico-City, rules that stimulate multi-robot cooperation have been added to the rulebook. After gaining control over the ball at the own half of the field, a team has to make at least one mandatory pass before a valid goal can be scored.

== Hardware ==
Fieldplayers must fit inside a 52 cm × 52 cm × 80 cm box. The goalkeeper robot can temporarily increase its frontal area ten centimeters in any direction. The maximum weight of the robot is 40 kg and its predominant color must be black. For inter-robot communication, a WLAN network is provided.

Most teams have adopted a holonomic mobile base with either three or four omniwheels. Velocities up to four meters per second are reached. To self-localize and to detect the location of opponents and the ball, most robots use omnidirectional cameras. On the goalkeeper robot these are often complemented with either laser scanners or depth cameras. Several robot designs have been released under open hardware licenses.

== Roadmap ==
Ultimately the goal of RoboCup is to beat the winner of the human world cup with a team of humanoid robots by 2050. Within a spectrum of different leagues, the role of RoboCup MSL is to take the shortest route towards FIFA compliant robot soccer, though not necessarily with robots of human form. To demonstrate the state of the art in robot soccer, at the end of every tournament a human team consisting of representatives of the International RoboCup Federation plays a match against the winner of the RoboCup MSL competition.

To prepare for major changes in rules or in specifications of the arena, at every RoboCup a side-event is organized. During this 'technical challenge,' teams are asked to focus on a certain subtask within the game of soccer. The 2006 competition's challenge was to demonstrate that a team of robots could pass the ball. More recent challenges have focussed on robot-robot cooperation without WiFi connection and playing soccer on uneven terrain (i.e., artificial grass instead of a carpet).
