= Object browser =

An object browser is a tool that allows a user to examine the components involved in a software package, such as Microsoft Word or software development packages.

An object browser will usually display the hierarchy of components; the properties and events associated with the objects; and other pertinent information; it also provides an interface for interacting with objects.

This hierarchy of components and its properties could be described with a path (XPath) for identifying a component within the hierarchy.
