= UNSW School of Computer Science and Engineering =

School of Computer Science and Engineering
- Established: 1991
- Parent institution: University of New South Wales
- Head of School: Professor Arcot Sowmya
- Students: 16,633 Undergraduate; 1430 Postgraduate Coursework; 116 PhD
- Website: www.cse.unsw.edu.au

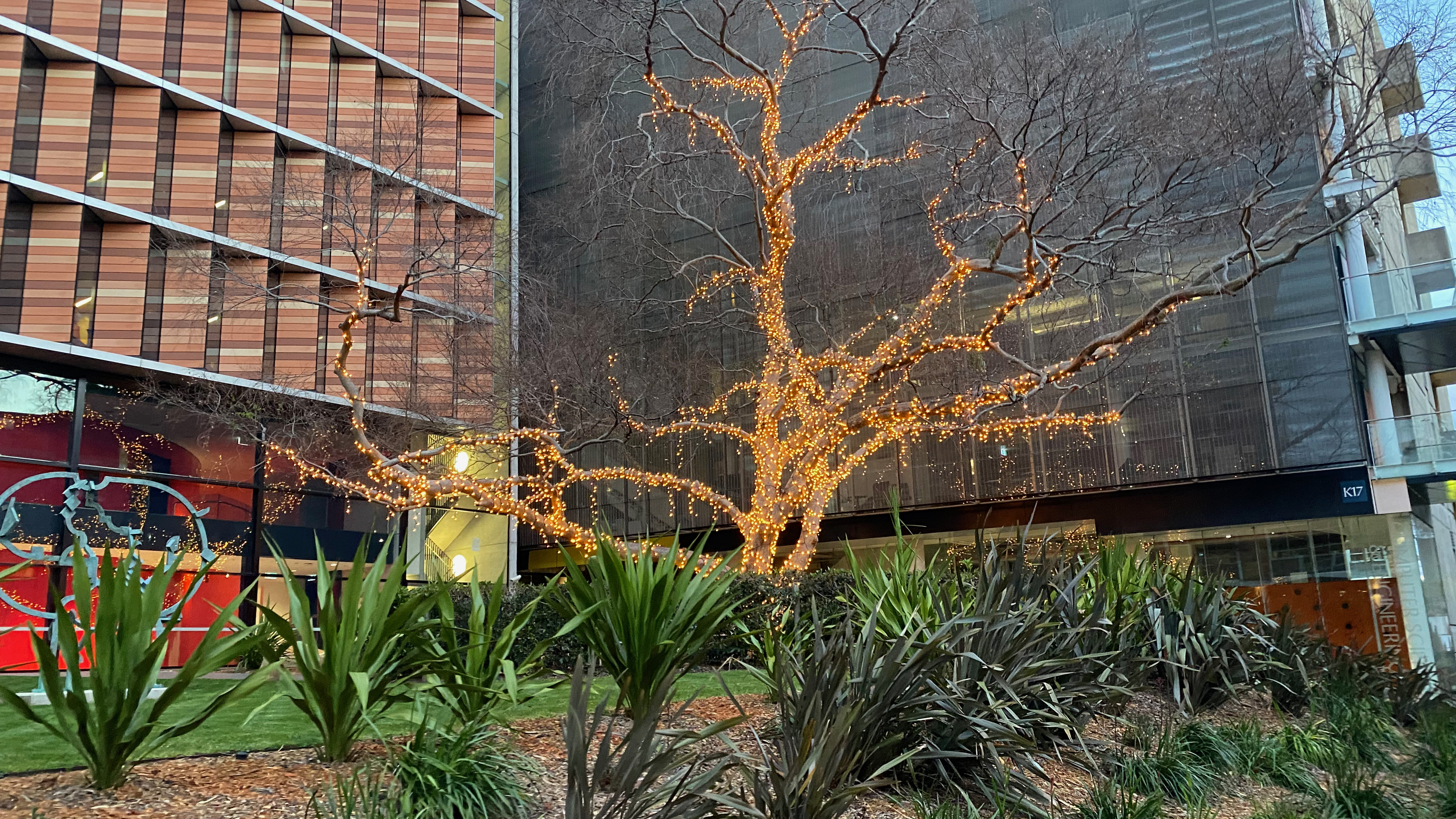
John Lions Garden outside of CSE with the tree illuminated

The UNSW School of Computer Science and Engineering (CSE) is part of the UNSW Faculty of Engineering and was founded in 1991 out of the former Department of Computer Science within the School of Electrical Engineering and Computer Science. It is the highest ranked and largest School of its kind in Australia. It offers degrees of Bachelor of Engineering (Honours) (Software Engineering), Bachelor of Advanced Computer Science (Honours), Double degrees, Master of Information Technology, Graduate Certificate in Computing, Graduate Diploma in Information Technology, Master of Philosophy, Doctor of Philosophy (PhD). The academic staff have research focus in areas such as Artificial Intelligence, Biomedical Image Computing, Data Knowledge, Embedded Systems, Networked Systems and Security, Programming Languages and Compilers, Service Oriented Computing, Theoretical Computer Science and Trustworthy Systems.

UNSW was a founding member of National ICT Australia (NICTA), which merged with CSIRO in 2015 to form Data61. CSE maintains strong ties with Data61.

The school has a number of notable alumni and former staff, including Associate Professor John Lions the author of the commentary on the UNIX operating system, a two-volume book entitled, a Source Code and Commentary on Unix Level 6) (A Commentary on the UNIX Operating System) who died in 1998.

== Excellence in Research for Australia ==
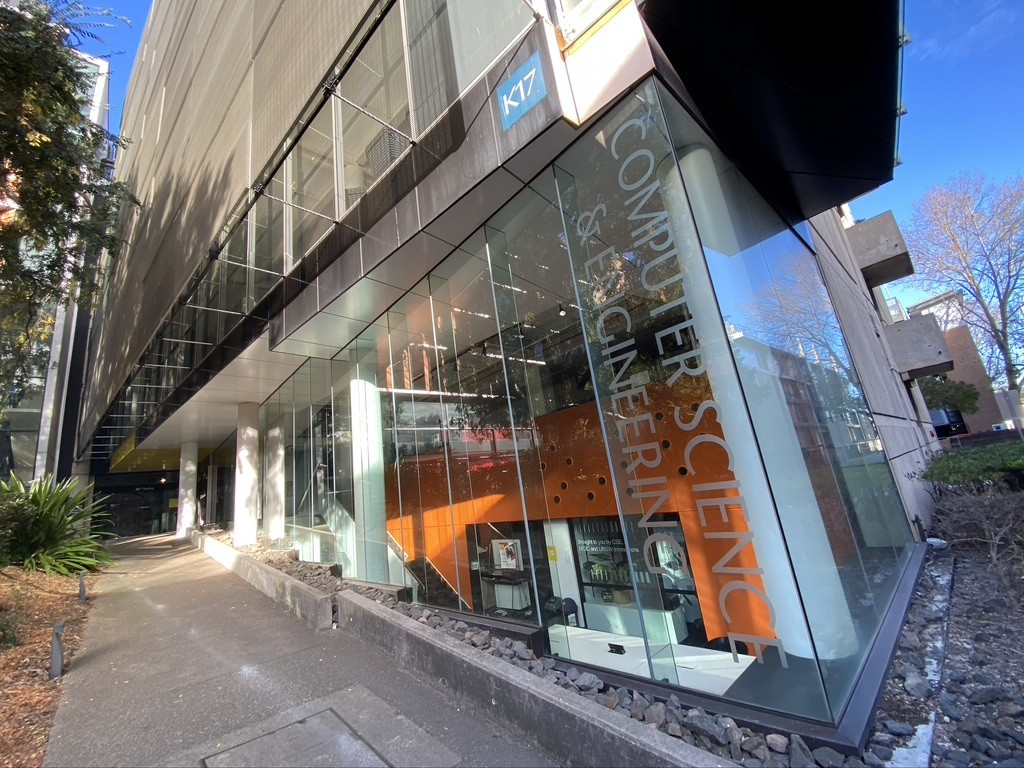
Computer Science and Engineering in UNSW

Australian Research Council's Excellence in Research for Australia initiative results for World-Class Research in Information Technology

- 2020/21: Ranked first in Australia in the Times Higher Education World University Rankings
- 2018/19: Shared first with ANU for Computer Software
- 2018/19: Maintained a rating of 5 for broad research fields of Engineering and Information and Computing Sciences
- 2013: Only Australian University to achieve a rank of 5 (the highest ranking) in Computer Software
- 2011: Broadest range (5 areas, the next highest was only in 2 areas) in Australia

== Rankings ==
| World Rankings | 2026 | 2025 | 2024 | 2023 | 2022 | 2021 | 2020 | 2019 | 2018 | 2017 | 2016 | 2015 | 2014 | 2013 | 2012 | 2011 | 2010 | |
|---|---|---|---|---|---|---|---|---|---|---|---|---|---|---|---|---|---|---|
| Leiden Rankings | | 54 (1st in Australia) | 47 (1st in Australia) | 47 (1st in Australia) | 52 (1st in Australia) | 50 (1st in Australia) | 41 | 43 | 52 | | | | | | | | | |
| QS World University Rankings in Computer Science & Information Systems | 54th (5th in Australia) | 46th (4th in Australia) | 59th (4th in Australia) | 57th (3rd in Australia) | 58th (3rd in Australia) | 59th (4th in Australia) | | 51-100 | 51-100 | 41st | 42nd | 35th | 35th | 29th | 29th | 10th | 42nd | - |
| ARWU for Computer Science and Engineering | | 49th | 51-75 | 51-75 | 51-75 (4th in Australia) | 51-75 (4th in Australia) | 51-75 | 76-100 | 101-150 | 40th | | | 42 | 51-75 | 51-75 | 52-75 | 52-75 | |
| Times Higher Education World University Rankings | 78th (4th in Australia) | 84 (6th in Australia) | 83 (6th in Australia) | 70 (6th in Australia) | 65 (3rd in Australia) | 54 | 79 | 126-150 | 101-125 | 51 | | | | | | | | |
| Performance Ranking of Scientific Papers for World Universities - Computer Science | | 27th | 37th | 29th | 38th | 39th | 42nd | 42nd | 64th | 62nd | 55th | 53rd | 65th | 67th | 86th | 105th | 124th | 105th |

== School Achievements ==
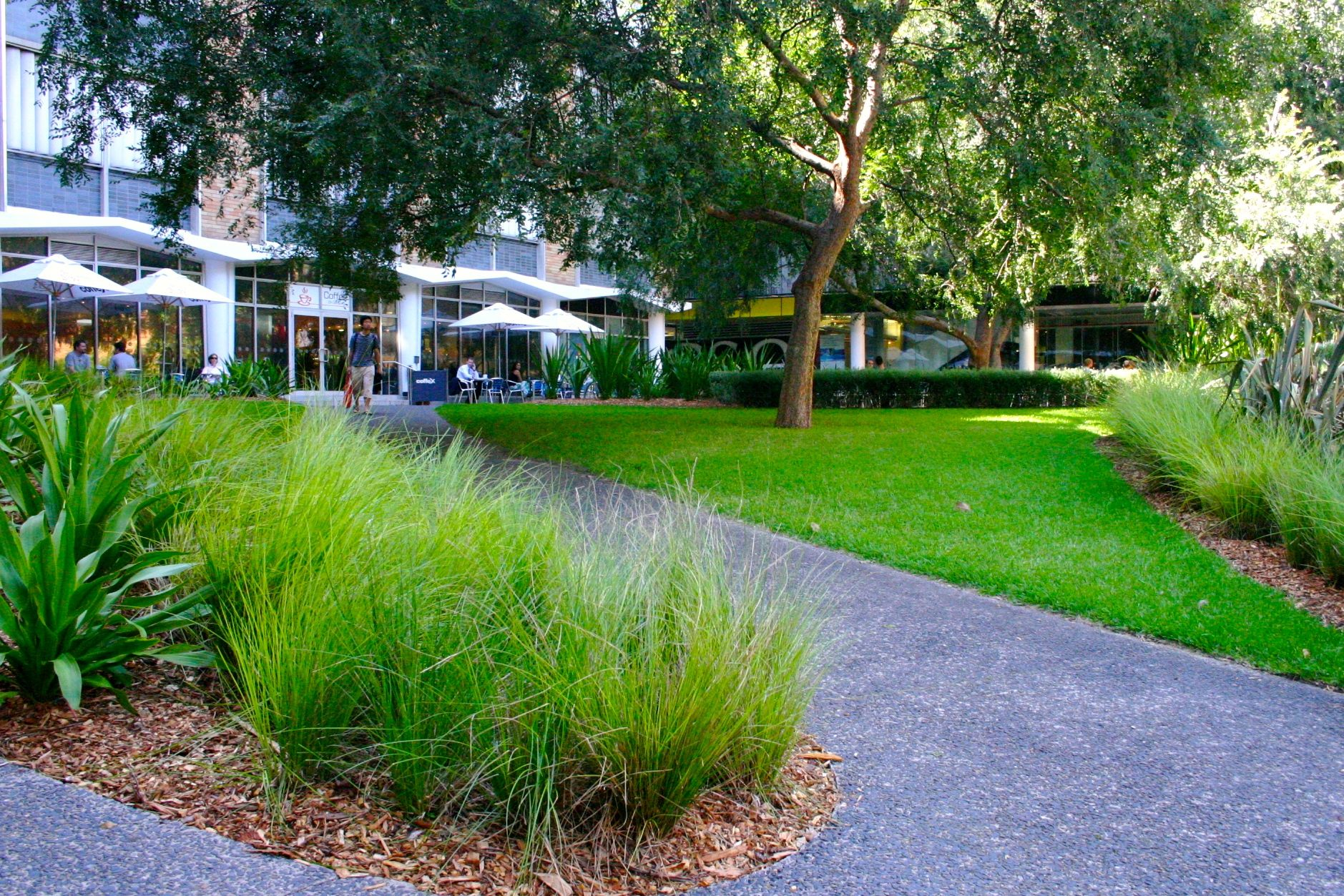
The UNSW Garden dedicated to John Lions

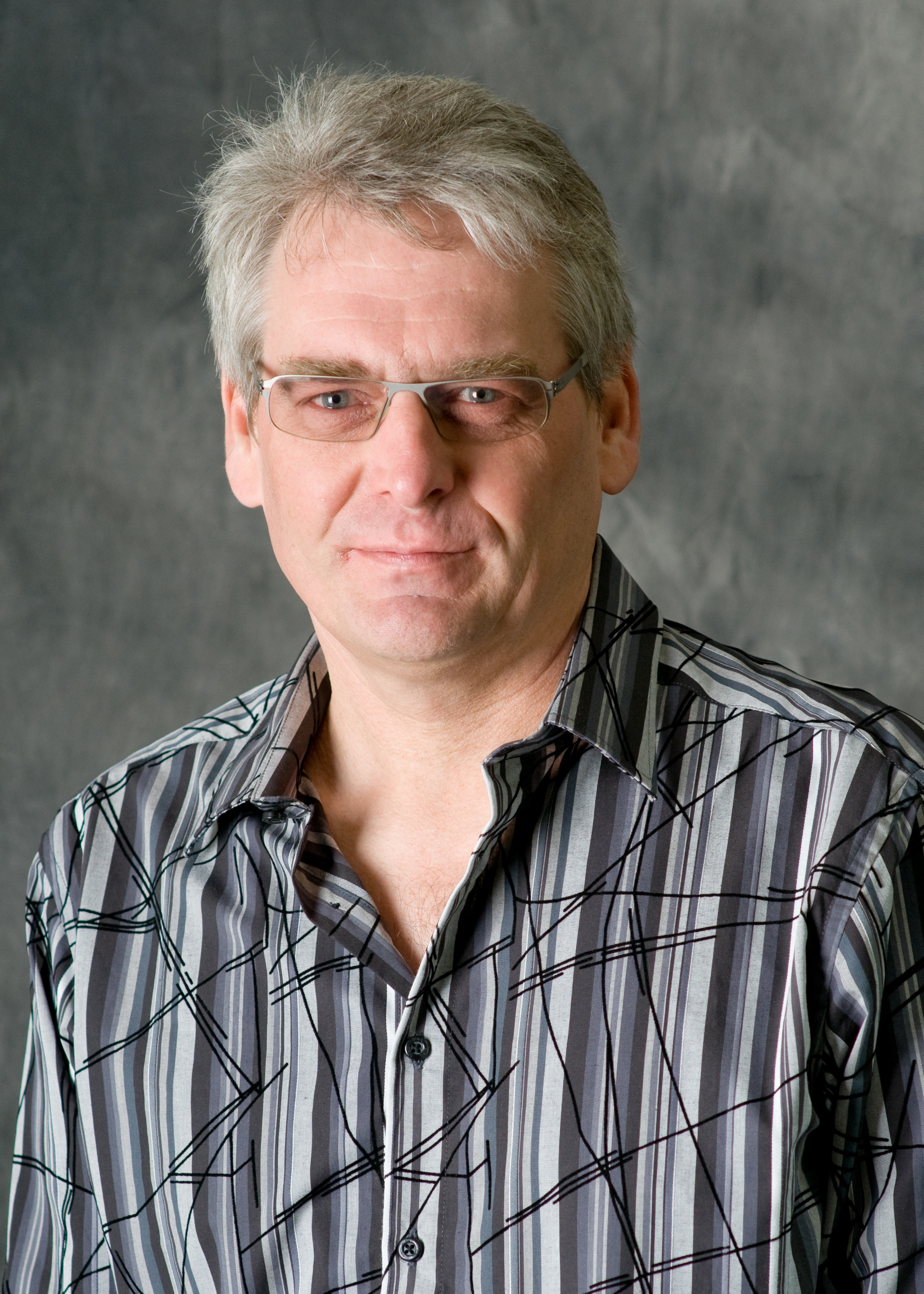
Gernot Heiser (OK Labs Founder, ACM Fellow)

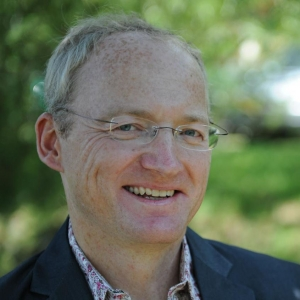
Toby Walsh (ARC Laureate Fellow, ACM Fellow)

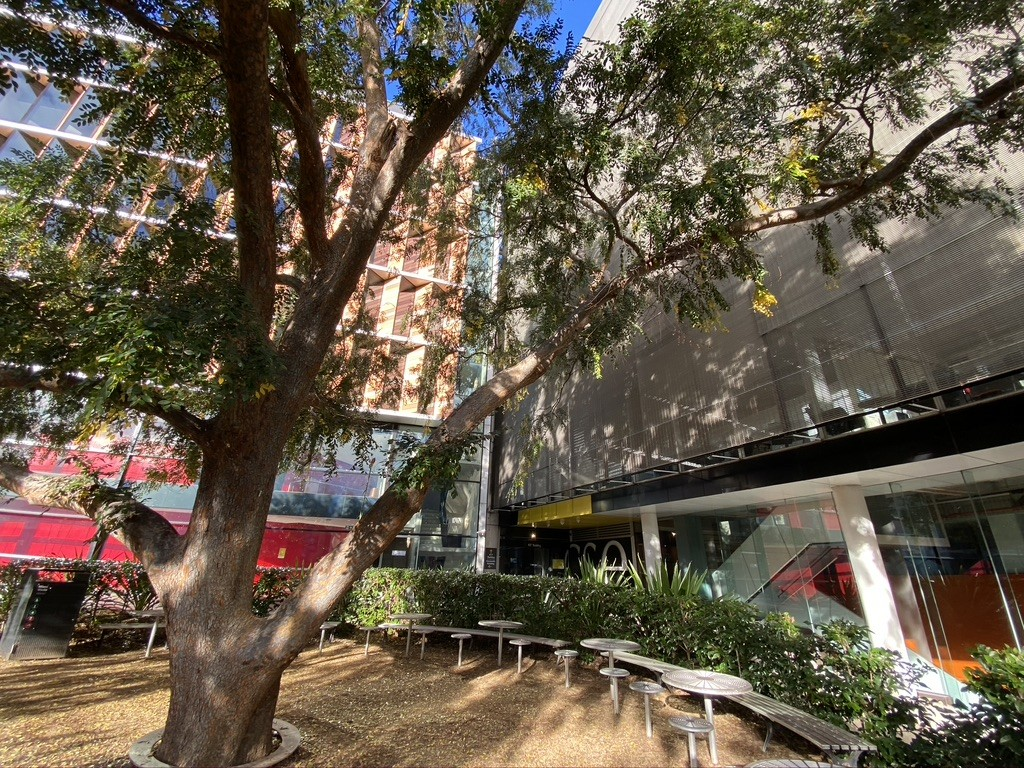
The UNSW Garden dedicated to John Lions in May 2020

School Achievements
| Year | Project/Achievement |
|---|---|
| 2026 | Professor Salil Kanhere - Fellow of the IEEE |
| | Scientia Professor Toby Walsh - Book "The Shortest History of AI" shortlisted for the Cosmos Book Prize |
| | Professor Sanjay Jha - ACM Distinguished Member (top 10% of ACM members worldwide) |
| | Professor Salil Kanhere - IEEE Communications Society IoT, Ad Hoc and Sensor Networks Technical Committee Outstanding Technical Achievement and Recognition Award |
| | Professor Wenjie Zhang - Member of the CORE Academy |
| | Emeritus Professor Carroll Morgan - Book "Formal Methods, Informally" published by Cambridge University Press, based on former UNSW course CS6721 |
| 2025 | Professor Wenjie Zhang - Fellow of the Royal Society of New South Wales |
| | Scientia Professor Gernot Heiser - IEEE Technical Committee on Real-Time Systems (TCRTS) Outstanding Technical Achievement and Leadership Award |
| | Associate Professor Sushmita Ruj - Australian Women in Security Award, Best Quantum in Cyber |
| | Senior Lecturer Hasindu Gamaarachchi - Eureka Prize for Outstanding Early Career Researcher |
| 2024 | Scientia Professor Toby Walsh - Fellow of Australian Academy of Technology and Engineering (ATSE) |
| | Professor Wenjie Zhang - Fellow of the Australian Computer Society (ACS) |
| 2023 | Professor Jingling Xue - Fellow of the IEEE |
| | Scientia Professor Toby Walsh - Celestino Eureka Prize for Promoting Understanding of Science for his work on artificial intelligence |
| | Professor Arcot Sowmya - 2023 Telstra Brilliant Women in Digital Health Award for Research |
| | Scientia Professor Gernot Heiser - Member of the German National Academy of Sciences Leopoldina |
| | Associate Professor Lina Yao - CORE Award for Outstanding Research Contribution |
| | Scientia Associate Professor Yang Song - Women in AI Award for AI in Health and AI Innovation |
| 2022 | Professor Boualem Benatallah - Fellow of the IEEE |
| | ACM Software System Award presented to the seL4 Foundation |
| | Professor Flora Salim - Women in AI Award for AI in Defence and Intelligence |
| | Scientia Professor Gernot Heiser - Fellow of the Royal Society of New South Wales |
| 2021 | Toby Walsh - Fellow of the Association for Computing Machinery |
| | Associate Professor Kevin Elphinstone - Eureka Prize for Outstanding Science in Safeguarding Australia |
| | Ken Robinson remembered in BCS FACS Facts Newsletter (2021-1) |
| 2020 | Scientia Professor Toby Walsh awarded Australian Laureate Fellowship from the Australian Research Council |
| | Scientia Professor Toby Walsh - Fellow of the Association for Computing Machinery (ACM) and Fellow of the American Association for the Advancement of Science (AAAS) |
| | Smartsparrow (Adaptive eLearning startup by Dr Dror Ben-Naim) sold to Pearson |
| | CSE Alumna Hannah Beder wins NSW Harvey Norman Young Woman of the Year |
| | Carroll Morgan – Book "The Science of Quantitative Information Flow" (Springer 2020, with co-authors) |
| | Gernot Heiser – Chair of seL4 Foundation |
| 2019 | Erik Meijering - Fellow of the IEEE |
| | Australia’s first Cybersecurity Education Summit |
| | Host to RoboCup 2019 in the Sydney International Convention Centre, chaired by Claude Sammut |
| | Gernot Heiser – Winner of ACM SIGOPS Hall of Fame award |
| 2018 | Guinness World Record with car "VIolet" - Lowest Energy Consumption Driving Trans-Australia (Perth to Sydney) - Electric Car |
| | Gernot Heiser -Chief Scientist Software, HENSOLDT Cyber GmbH |
| 2016 | SEARCC, 2016 ICT Researcher of the Year - Gernot Heiser |
| | Gernot Heiser - Fellow of Australian Academy of Technology and Engineering (ATSE) |
| | Gernot Heiser - Fellow of the IEEE |
| | Xuemin Lin - Fellow of the IEEE |
| 2015 | Carroll Morgan - Winner (with 5 co-authors) of The USA's National Security Agency (NSA) Annual Cybersecurity Research Paper Competition |
| | Gernot Heiser - Australian Computer Society ICT Researcher of the Year |
| | Toby Walsh - Association for Constraint Programming (ACP) Research Excellence Award |
| 2014 | Humboldt Research, prize Toby Walsh |
| | rUNSWift placed 1st in the RoboCup Standard Platform League |
| | Gernot Heiser was awarded Fellow of the ACM and Engineers Australia Entrepreneur of the Year |
| 2013 | Most number of Tech Startups for any Australian University |
| 2011 | Excellence in Research for Australia Only Australian University to achieve a rank of 5 (the highest ranking) in Computer Software |
| | Excellence in Research for Australia Broadest range (5 areas) of research in Information and Computing Sciences |
| | Smartsparrow founded by CSE Alumna, Dr Dror Ben-Naim |
| 2010 | ARWU Ranked 1st in Australia for Computer Science |
| 2009 | HS1917 established |
| | L4.verified |
| | OK L4 Deployment reaches 500 million |
| 2008 | ARTEMIS Orchestra Contest, world champions with the Robot Clarinet |
| | John Lions Chair in Computer Science Established |
| | Toby Walsh - Fellow of the Association for the Advancement of Artificial Intelligence |
| | OKL4 Deployment reaches 100 million |
| 2007 | Freescale Technical Innovation Award |
| | NICTA L4 Deployment reaches 10 million |
| | Robotics Workshops established |
| 2006 | Happy Feet - Christian So, Lead Animator for "Mumble" |
| | UNSW L4 Deployment reaches 1 million |
| | Orion Search Engine, written by Ori Allon, bought by Google |
| 2005 | Fastest-ever IPC (Itanium) |
| 2003 | Establishment of NICTA (National ICT Australia, Ltd) |
| | Establishment of CAS (the ARC Centre of Excellence for Autonomous Systems) |
| 2001 | Establishment of the Smart Internet Technology CRC |
| | CSE Revue established |
| 1999 | PLEB designed |
| | Primary School Workshops Established |
| 1997 | Fastest-ever IPC on single-issue CPU (MIPS) |
| | U4600 Board designed |
| | UNSW ProgComp Established |
| 1996 | Cane Toad Tracking Project begins |
| 1995 | UNSW L4 Project begins |
| 1991 | The School of Computer Science and Engineering was established |
| 1990 | First clinical use of RDR |
| 1976 | Lions' Commentary on UNIX 6th Edition, with Source Code |
| 1975 | First non-US UNIX site (Version 6 Unix) |
| 1956 | UTECOM became the first digital computer in Sydney |

== Student projects ==
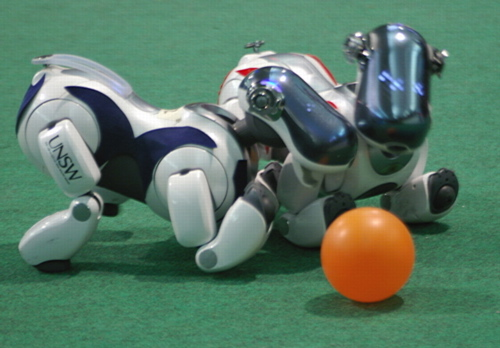
rUNSWift in a four-legged league game from RoboCup 2006 in Breman, Germany.

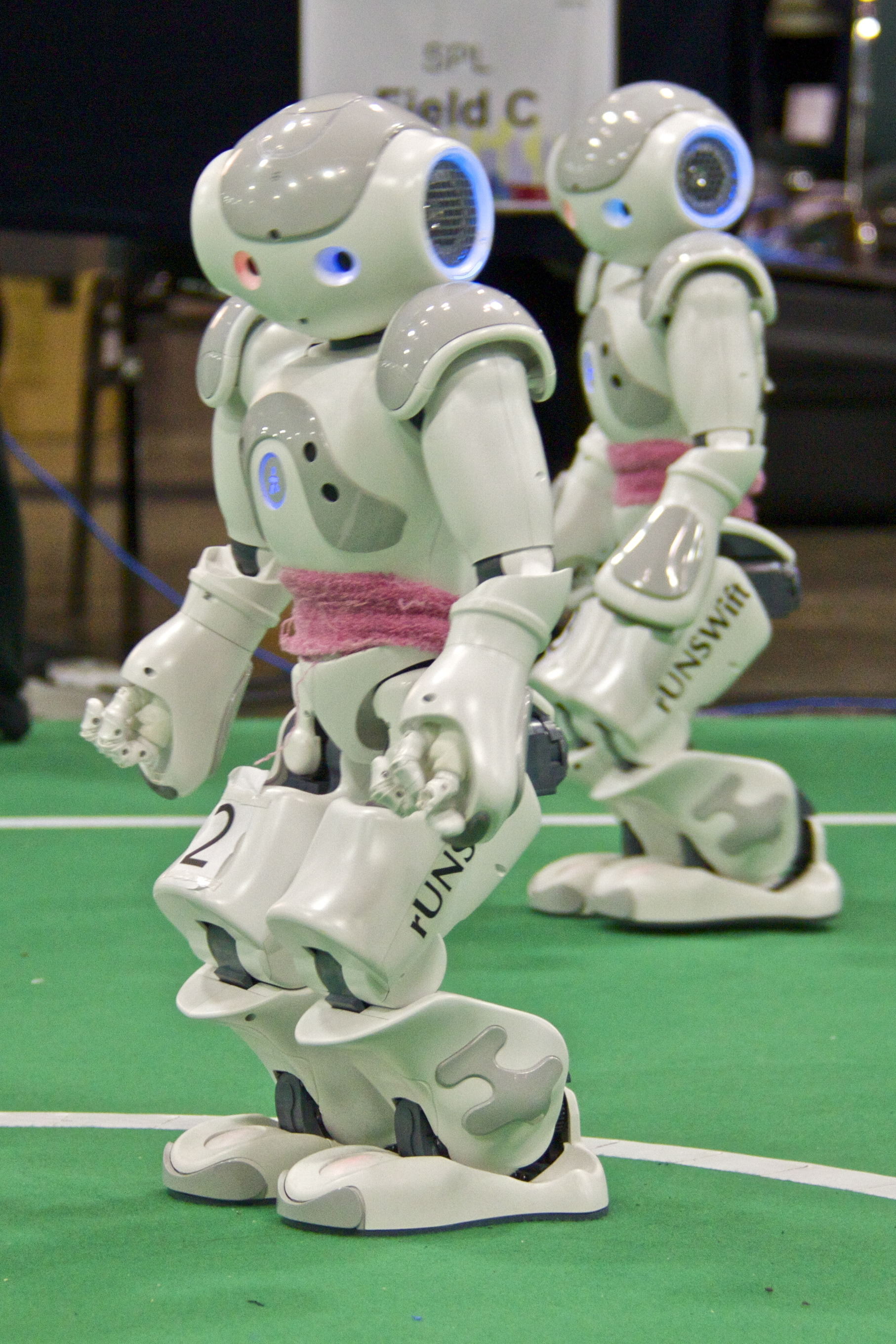
rUNSWift in a Standard Platform League game from RoboCup 2010 in Singapore.

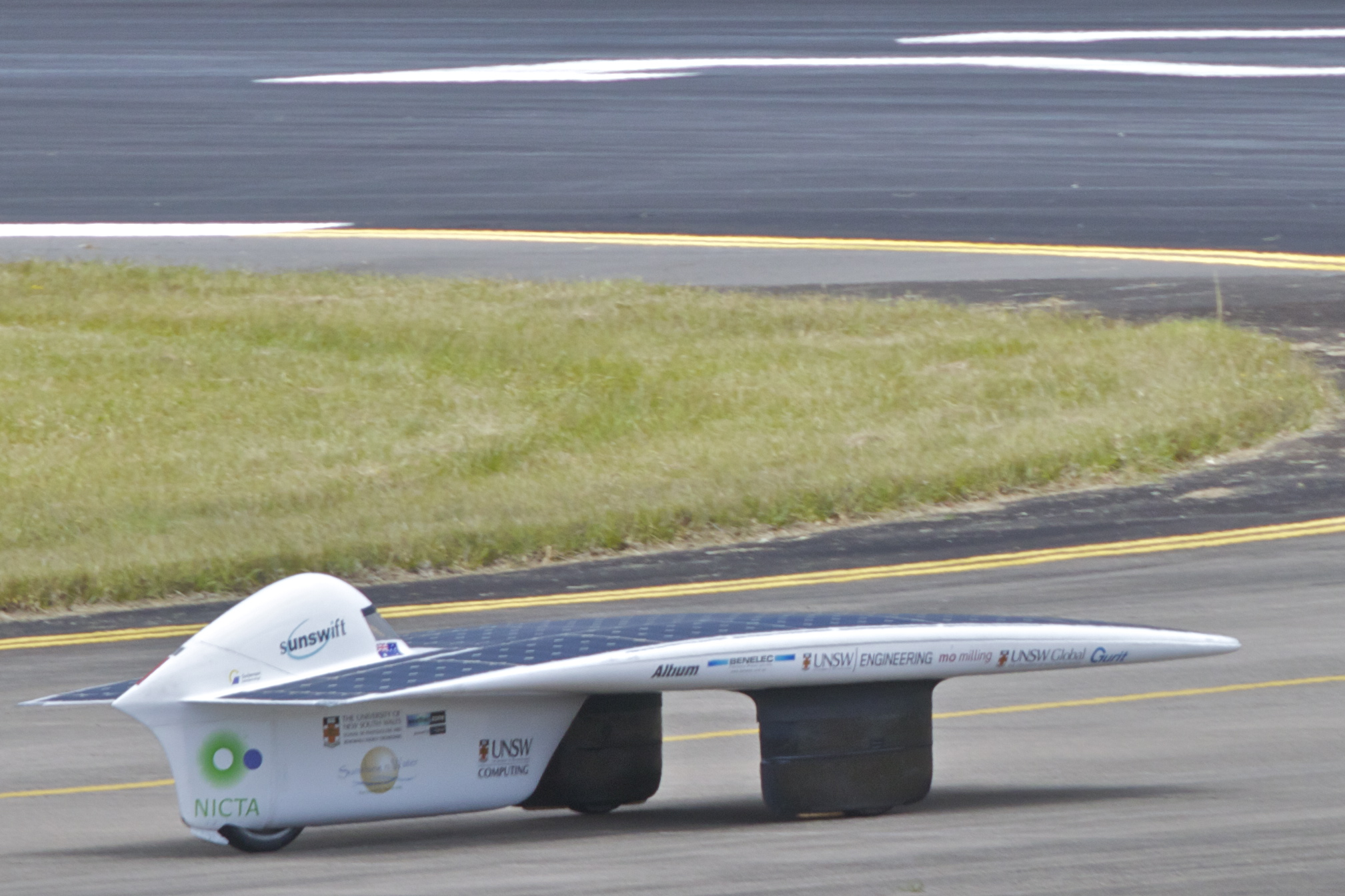
Sunswift IVy During the World Solar-Car Speed Record attempt.

Students of the School are involved in a number of high-profile projects, including:

- rUNSWift, the University's team in the international RoboCup Standard Platform League competition, is the most successful team in the world, with wins in 2000, 2001, 2003, 2014 and 2015, as well as coming second in 1999, 2002, 2005 and 2010.

RoboCup Standard Platform League
| Year | Result | Final | | |
| Year | Result | Winners | Score | Runners-up |
|---|---|---|---|---|
| 2015 (Nao) | 1st | rUNSWift (UNSW); Australia | 3-1 | HTWK; Germany |
| 2014 (Nao) | 1st | rUNSWift (UNSW); Australia | 5-1 | HTWK; Germany |
| 2010 (Nao) | 2nd | B-Human; Germany | 6-1 | rUNSWift (UNSW); Australia |
| 2006 (AIBO) | 2nd | NUBots; Australia | 7-3 | rUNSWift (UNSW); Australia |
| 2003 (AIBO) | 1st | rUNSWift (UNSW); Australia | 4-3 | UPennalizers; United States |
| 2002 (AIBO) | 2nd | CM United; United States | 3-3 | rUNSWift (UNSW); Australia |
| 2001 (AIBO) | 1st | UNSW United (UNSW); Australia | 9-2 | CM United; United States |
| 2000 (AIBO) | 1st | UNSW United (UNSW); Australia | 10-0 | LRP; France |
| 1999 (AIBO) | 2nd | LRP; France | 4-1 | UNSW United (UNSW); Australia |

- Sunswift Solar Cars
  - 2018: Guinness World Record with car "VIolet" - Lowest Energy Consumption Driving Trans-Australia (Perth to Sydney) - Electric Car.
  - 2014: FIA Land Speed Record with car "Sunswift eVe" - Sunswift eVe breaks the record for the fastest electric car over 500 kilometres (310 mi), with an average speed of 107 kilometres per hour (66 mph). The previous record of 73 kilometres per hour (45 mph) was set in 1988.
  - 2011: Guinness World Record with car "Sunswift IVy" - Fastest Solar Powered Vehicle: 88.8 kilometres per hour (55.2 mph).
  - 2009: Winner of the Silicon Challenge Class at the Global Green Challenge with the car "Sunswift IVy".
- BLUEsat Satellite
  - 2018: 8th in the European Rover Challenge (ERC)

RoboCup Rescue Robot League
| Year | Host | Rank |
|---|---|---|
| 2011 | Istanbul | 1st in Autonomy |
| 2010 | Singapore | 1st Autonomy; 1st mobility |
| 2009 | Graz - Austria | 1st Autonomy; 2nd Mobility; Innovative Operator Interface |
| 2006 | Bremen - Germany | 2nd in Autonomy |
| 2005 | Osaka - Japan | 3rd Overall |

== Student competitions ==
ACM International Collegiate Programming Contest
| Year | Regional Finals | World Champions |
|---|---|---|
| 2021 | 1st, 2nd, 3rd | Oct 2021 |
| 2020 | 1st | No event |
| 2019 | 8th, 9th | Honorable mention |
| 2018 | 1st | 6th Silver Medal |
| 2017 | 1st, 2nd | 13th |
| 2016 | 1st, 2nd | 69th |
| 2015 | 1st | 51st |
| 2014 | 2nd | 19th |
| 2013 | 1st, 2nd | 60th |
| 2012 | 1st | 36th |
| 2011 | 1st | Honourable Mention |
| 2007 | - | 44th |
| 2005 | 1st | Honourable Mention |
| 2003 | 1st | 21st |
| 2002 | 1st | 11th |
| 2001 | 1st | 11th |

Other Contests
| Year | Contest | Australian Rank | World Rank |
|---|---|---|---|
| 2018 | Cyber Security Challenge Australia | 1st, 2nd | N/A |
| 2017 | Cyber Security Challenge Australia | 1st | N/A |
| 2015 | Cyber Security Challenge Australia | 1st, 2nd, 3rd, 4th | N/A |
| 2015 | DEF CON CTF Qualification | 1st | 3rd |
| 2014 | DEF CON CTF Qualification | 1st | 3rd |
| 2014 | Cyber Security Challenge Australia | 1st, 2nd, 3rd, 5th | N/A |
| 2013 | DEF CON | 1st | 10th |
| 2013 | SECUINSIDE | 1st | 4th |
| 2013 | Cyber Security Challenge Australia | 1st, 2nd, 3rd | N/A |
| 2013 | Imagine Cup | 1st | 3rd |
| 2013 | Codehire Cup | 2nd (Students) | N/A |
| 2013 | Appathon | 2nd | N/A |
| 2013 | CiSRA Extreme Imaging | 2nd | N/A |
| 2012 | Cyber Security Challenge Australia | 1st | N/A |

== Computing facilities ==
The School has computer laboratories for coursework teaching and student projects, including a number of specialist laboratories. The network supports well in excess of 1000 computers for teaching, research and administration.

- 300+ Intel-based computers running Linux in 13 generic teaching laboratories; Microsoft Windows is available 'virtualized' in all Linux labs
- 20 AppleOS computers reserved in a specialized teaching laboratory
- 40 Linux computers in laboratories reserved for thesis students
- 1200+ computing sessions available in a 'virtualized' lab environment
- 150+ heterogeneous computers dedicated to post-grad research students
- 10+ discrete GPU servers for deep-learning research
- 40+ discrete CPU servers available in Linux clusters for research
- Virtual Reality lab
- laptop locker
- 1 multi-host vSphere production cluster with dedicated 60TB SAN
  - 100 virtualized servers for academic staff teaching and research requirements
- 1 multi-host vSphere research cluster with dedicated 20TB SAN
  - 30 virtualized servers for dedicated and ad-hoc research requirements
- 30+ heterogeneous computers for administration and systems support
- extensive backup infrastructure, utilizing incremental and full backup to tape

The School is committed to a regular cycle of upgrades and invests heavily to maintain a state-of-the-art IT environment.
