= Lions Book =

Lions Book or Lion Books may refer to:

- Lion Books, a 1950 Japanese manga series turned experimental anime
- Lion Books, an imprint of the British book publishing company Lion Hudson
- Lion Books (publisher), an imprint of the American book publishing company Martin Goodman
- Lion (comics), a 1950 British comic book
- Lions' Commentary on UNIX 6th Edition, with Source Code, a Unix kernel book by John Lions
