= Walkman Keitai W42S =

2006 Japanese mobile phone

- Brand: au, Walkman
- Manufacturer: Sony Ericsson Mobile Communications
- First released: June 20, 2006
- Compatible networks: CDMA2000 1xMC (CDMA 1X WIN) (800 MHz / 2 GHz)
- Form factor: Slider
- Colors: Spark Pink; Heat Black; Prism White
- Dimensions: 106 mm × 49 mm × 24 mm (max. 26 mm)
- Weight: 123 g (4 oz)
- Operating system: REX OS
- CPU: 225 MHz Qualcomm MSM6550
- Storage: Dedicated for LISMO: 1 GB; Other data: 38 MB
- Removable storage: Memory Stick Duo, Memory Stick PRO Duo
- Battery: Standby: Approx. 250 hours Talk: Approx. 200 minutes
- Charging: Approx. 130 minutes
- Rear camera: 1.25 megapixels CMOS image sensor (fixed focus)
- Front camera: None
- Display: 2.2-inch transflective micro-reflective TFT LCD, QVGA (240 × 320 pixels), 262,144 colors
- Connectivity: CDMA2000 1xEV-DO Rel.0 (CDMA 1X WIN)
- Data inputs: POBox + Advanced Wnn V2
- SAR: SAR value: 1.15 W/kg
- Other: FM radio, IrDA

The Walkman Keitai W42S (Japanese: ウォークマンケータイ W42S) is a mobile phone terminal manufactured by Sony Ericsson Mobile Communications (now Sony Mobile Communications) for CDMA 1X WIN, a network brand operated by KDDI and Okinawa Cellular Telephone Company under the au brand.

It was developed as the company's first "Walkman Phone" for the Japanese domestic market.

== Features ==
The Sony Ericsson Walkman® Keitai featured 1 GB of internal storage dedicated to audio files and a 30-hour continuous playback battery life, which was the longest of any mobile phone at the time.

The device features expandable storage via commercially available Memory Stick PRO Duo cards, supporting capacities up to 4 GB. It is compatible with full-length ringtones and ATRAC3 audio files transferred using the bundled SonicStage CP music management software for PC. Additionally, the device offers a continuous music playback time of up to 30 hours.

The lower section of the device features a "Music Shuttle" controller, which is based on the Walkman Stick design. Holding down the center button launches "Shuttle Player," a dedicated software application that plays music alongside visual effects and customizable interface themes. The shuttle button can be twisted to control fast-forwarding, rewinding, and skipping tracks. Although the device utilizes a slider form factor, its music functions can be fully operated while the handset is closed.
