= Sony Ericsson W43S =

Mobile phone

W43S
- Brand: au
- Manufacturer: Sony Ericsson Mobile Communications
- Type: Feature phone
- First released: September 14, 2006
- Predecessor: W32S
- Successor: W51S
- Compatible networks: CDMA 1X WIN (800 MHz / 2 GHz)
- Form factor: Clamshell
- Colors: Mocha Brown; Calm White; Ambition Red
- Dimensions: 103 mm (4.1 in) H 48 mm (1.9 in) W 19.8 mm (0.78 in) D
- Weight: 115 g (4.1 oz)
- Operating system: REX OS + KCP
- CPU: ARM9E
- Storage: 42 MB
- Removable storage: Memory Stick Duo
- Rear camera: 2.01 MP CMOS, no AF
- Display: Main: 2.7 in (69 mm) Full Wide QVGA (240×432 pixels), 260k colors TFT LCD; Sub: 1.1 in (28 mm) monochrome LCD (120×27 pixels)
- References: SAR value: 0.89 W/kg

The W43S is a CDMA 1X WIN feature phone developed by Sony Ericsson Mobile Communications (now Sony Mobile) for the au brand operated by KDDI and Okinawa Cellular Telephone.

== History ==
- June 7, 2006: Certified by Telecom Engineering Center (TELEC).
- June 23, 2006: Certified by Japan Approvals Institute for Telecommunications Equipment (JATE).
- August 28, 2006: Officially announced by KDDI.
- September 14, 2006: Released early in the Chūgoku region.
- September 15, 2006: Released in all remaining regions across Japan.

=== Software updates ===
On September 28, 2006, a software update was issued to resolve the following issues:

- Saving emails received on a non-W43S Memory Stick Duo device and accessing the email inbox on the Memory Stick Duo via the W43S caused emails in the inbox to display twice, or resulted in the inbox remaining stuck on "Loading".
- Performing copy or cut operations on edited text strings while using email or notepad caused system resets during cuts or prevented copied text strings from being pasted.

On December 13, 2006, a software update was issued to resolve the following issues:

- Key response degraded or settings for toggling the EZ-Appli menu display failed to save.
- Automatic reception of email attachments failed.
- Initial setup for EZ services failed, preventing email reception.

On March 25, 2008, a software update was issued to resolve the following issues:

- Specific operations caused the email sent history to be erased.
- The device reset when playing e-book files.
- Streaming Chaku-Uta content on EZweb failed to display track titles.

== Specifications ==
=== Hardware ===
The defining feature of the device is the set of 12 LEDs on the rear panel, collectively named "Akari" (Light). These LEDs illuminate to notify the user of missed calls and unread messages; the upper-left three indicate missed voice calls, the upper-right three indicate missed C-mail messages, the lower-left three indicate unread notifications, and the lower-right three indicate unread e-mail messages. The illumination pattern can be chosen from three options: "Soft" (Yawaraka), "Light" (Karoyaka), and "Gorgeous" (Hanayaka). Similar to the W32S, the exterior design can be customized using optional Style-Up panels, which also modify the shape of the LED illumination window.

The device features a main screen known as the "Full Wide Display," measuring 2.7 inches with a resolution of 432×240 pixels. This screen is larger than the Wide QVGA displays (240×400 pixels) used in Casio handsets, possessing a 9:5 aspect ratio that is wider than the standard 16:9 widescreen format. It incorporates the "RealityMAX" display engine derived from Sony's BRAVIA television line and adapted for mobile devices; this engine is also featured in the W44S and the SO903i for NTT Docomo.

Unlike the W32S and W41S, which embedded the FeliCa chip on the display side of the flip body, the W43S houses the chip within the main body, aligning with most contemporary mobile devices.

=== Software ===
The phone supports various carrier services, including:

- PC Site Viewer
- LISMO (au LISTEN MOBILE SERVICE)
- Chaku-Uta Full
- EZ Chaku-Uta (High-Quality Stereo)
- EZ Navi Walk (Voice Input)
- EZ-FM
- EZ FeliCa
- Hello Messenger
- Infrared Communication (IrDA)
- EZappli (BREW)
- Anshin Navi
- Pair Function
- GLOBAL EXPERT
- Memory Stick Audio (ATRAC3/ATRAC3plus)

== See also ==
- W32S – Predecessor model
- W51S – Successor model
- Feature phone
- au
- Sony Ericsson
- CDMA 1X WIN
