= Wombat (operating system) =

Microkernel operating system

- Developer: National ICT Australia
- OS family: L4
- Initial release: 2004; 22 years ago
- Latest release: 2.6.9.1
- Marketing target: Embedded systems
- Available in: English
- Supported platforms: x86, ARM, MIPS
- Kernel type: Microkernel paravirtualised Linux (running on L4Ka::Pistachio and IGUANA)
- License: GPLv2

In computing, Wombat is an operating system, a high-performance virtualised Linux embedded operating system marketed by Open Kernel Labs, a spin-off of National ICT Australia's (now NICTA) Embedded, Real Time, Operating System Program.

Wombat is a de-privileged (paravirtualised) Linux running on an L4 and IGUANA system. It is optimized for embedded systems.

== See also ==
- L4Linux
