= Toby Walsh =

British computer scientist

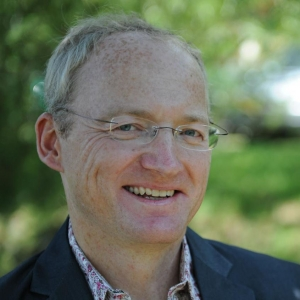
- Walsh in 2008
- Education: University of Cambridge; University of Edinburgh
- Scientific career
- Fields: Artificial Intelligence, Automated reasoning
- Workplaces: University of New South Wales and Data61, (formerly NICTA)
- Doctoral advisor: Alan Bundy

Toby Walsh is a British computer scientist who is Chief Scientist at UNSW.ai, the AI Institute of UNSW Sydney. He is a Laureate fellow, and professor of artificial intelligence in the UNSW School of Computer Science and Engineering at the University of New South Wales and Data61 (formerly NICTA). He has served as Scientific Director of NICTA, Australia's centre of excellence for ICT research. He is noted for his work in artificial intelligence, especially in the areas of social choice, constraint programming and propositional satisfiability. He has served on the Executive Council of the Association for the Advancement of Artificial Intelligence.

== Career ==
He received an M.A. degree in theoretical physics and mathematics from the University of Cambridge and a M.Sc. and Ph.D. degree in artificial intelligence from the University of Edinburgh. He has held research positions in Australia, England, Ireland, Italy, France, Germany, Scotland, and Sweden. He has been Editor-in-Chief of the Journal of Artificial Intelligence Research, and of AI Communications. He was chaired several conferences in the area of artificial intelligence including the International Joint Conference on Artificial Intelligence. He is Editor of the Handbook of Constraint Programming, and of the Handbook of Satisfiability. He proposed the idea of Turing red flag laws, which require any AI system to identify itself as a computer program to prevent human confusion.

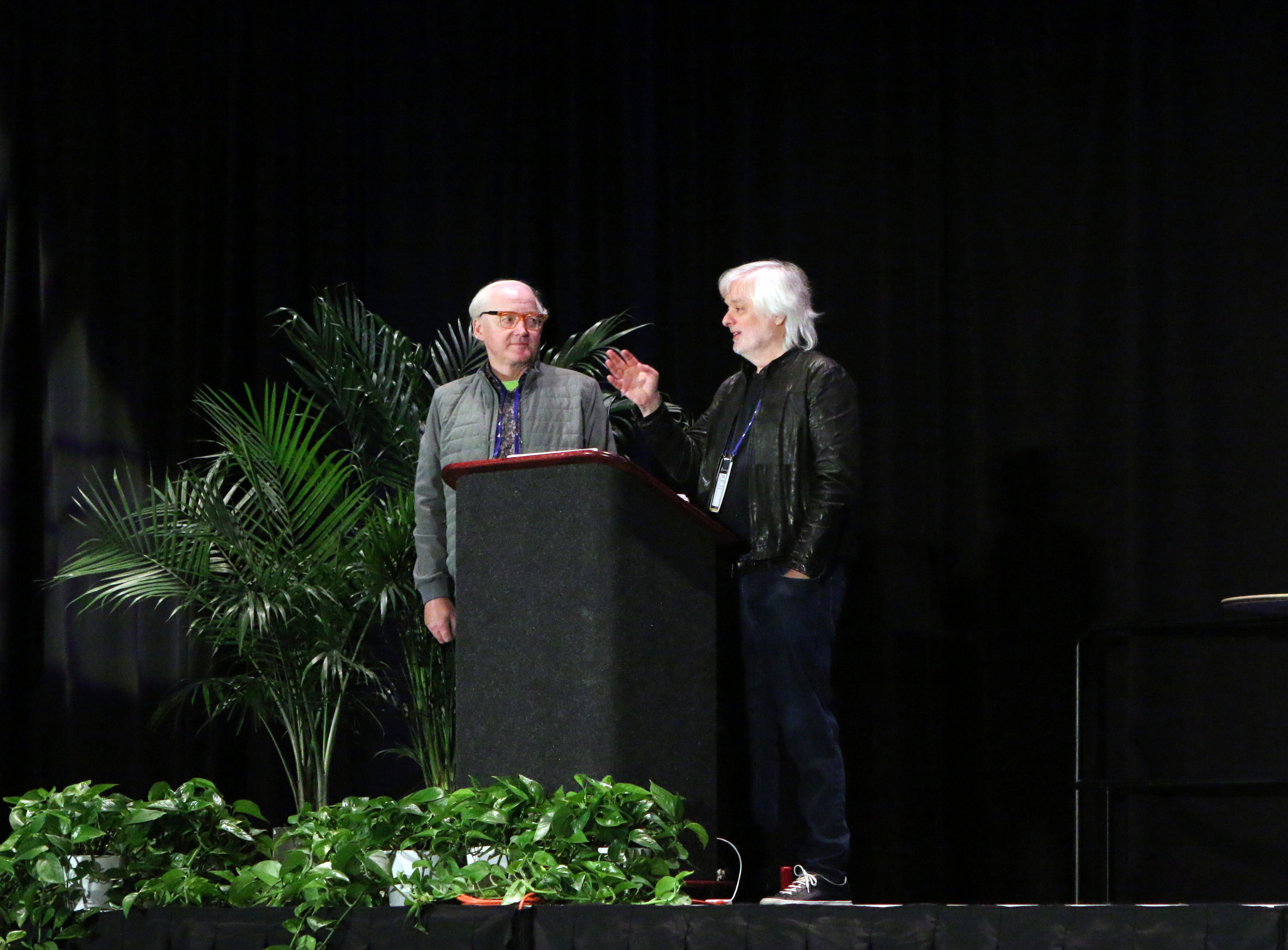
Toby Walsh (on the right) with David Chalmers at AAAI Conference 2025, Philadelphia

In 2015, he helped release an open letter calling for a ban on offensive autonomous weapons that attracted over 20,000 signatures. He later gave a talk at TEDxBerlin on this topic. In 2017, he organized an open letter calling for a ban signed by over 100 founders of AI and Robotics companies. Also in 2017, he organized a letter to the Prime Minister of Australia calling for Australia to negotiate towards a ban signed by over one hundred researchers from Australia working on artificial intelligence. In 2022, he was one of 121 prominent Australians banned from travelling to Russia indefinitely for his outspoken criticism of the use of AI by the Russian military.

In 2018, he chaired the Expert Working Group of the Australian Council of Learned Academies (ACOLA) preparing a Horizon Scanning Report on the "Deployment of Artificial Intelligence and what it presents for Australia" at the request of Australia’s Chief Scientist, Dr Alan Finkel, and on behalf of the Commonwealth Science Council. Additionally, he was interviewed on ABC Comedy by Tom Ballard, discussing the "robot revolution".

He is the author of four books on artificial intelligence for a general audience: "It's Alive!: Artificial Intelligence from the Logic Piano to Killer Robots", which looks at the history and present of AI, "2062: The World that AI Made", which looks at the potential impact AI will have on our society, and "Machines Behaving Badly: the Morality of AI", which looks at the ethical challenges of AI. His latest book is Faking It: Artificial intelligence in a Human World, was published in 2023. All four books are published by Black Inc. The books are available in ten different languages: Chinese, English, German, Korean, Polish, Romanian, Russian, Taiwanese, Turkish and Vietnamese.

== Honors and awards ==
In 2023, Walsh won the Celestino Eureka Prize for Promoting Understanding of Science for his work on artificial intelligence.

In 2020, he was elected a Fellow of the ACM and a Fellow of the American Association for the Advancement of Science.

In 2018, he was runner up in the Arms Control Association's annual Person/s of the Year Award.

In 2016, he was elected a Fellow of the Australian Academy of Science, won the NSW Premier's Prize for Excellence in Engineering and ICT, and was made Scientia Professor at UNSW.

In 2015, the Association for Constraint Programming presented him with their Research Excellence Award, which identifies and honours the most influential people in the field.

In 2014, he won a Humboldt Prize.

In 2008, he was elected a Fellow of the Association for the Advancement of Artificial Intelligence for "significant and sustained contributions to automated deduction and constraint programming, and for extraordinary service to the AI community".

In 2003, he was elected a Fellow of the European Association for Artificial Intelligence in recognition of "significant, sustained contributions to the field of artificial intelligence".
