= IGUANA Computing =

Operating system developers

Independent Group of Unix-Alikes and Networking Activists (IGUANA) are developers of the Wombat system.

IGUANA is also an operating system (OS) personality that provides a set of services for memory management and process protection. Iguana is designed as a base for the provision of operating system services for embedded systems. Among others, it provides the underlying OS for Wombat, a version of paravirtualised Linux designed to provide legacy support for embedded systems.

Wombat works together with Pistachio, Kenge and Iguana.

It is also used, along with Pistachio, to create Qualcomm's REX OS designed for cell phones.
