= Gernot Heiser =

Australian computer scientist

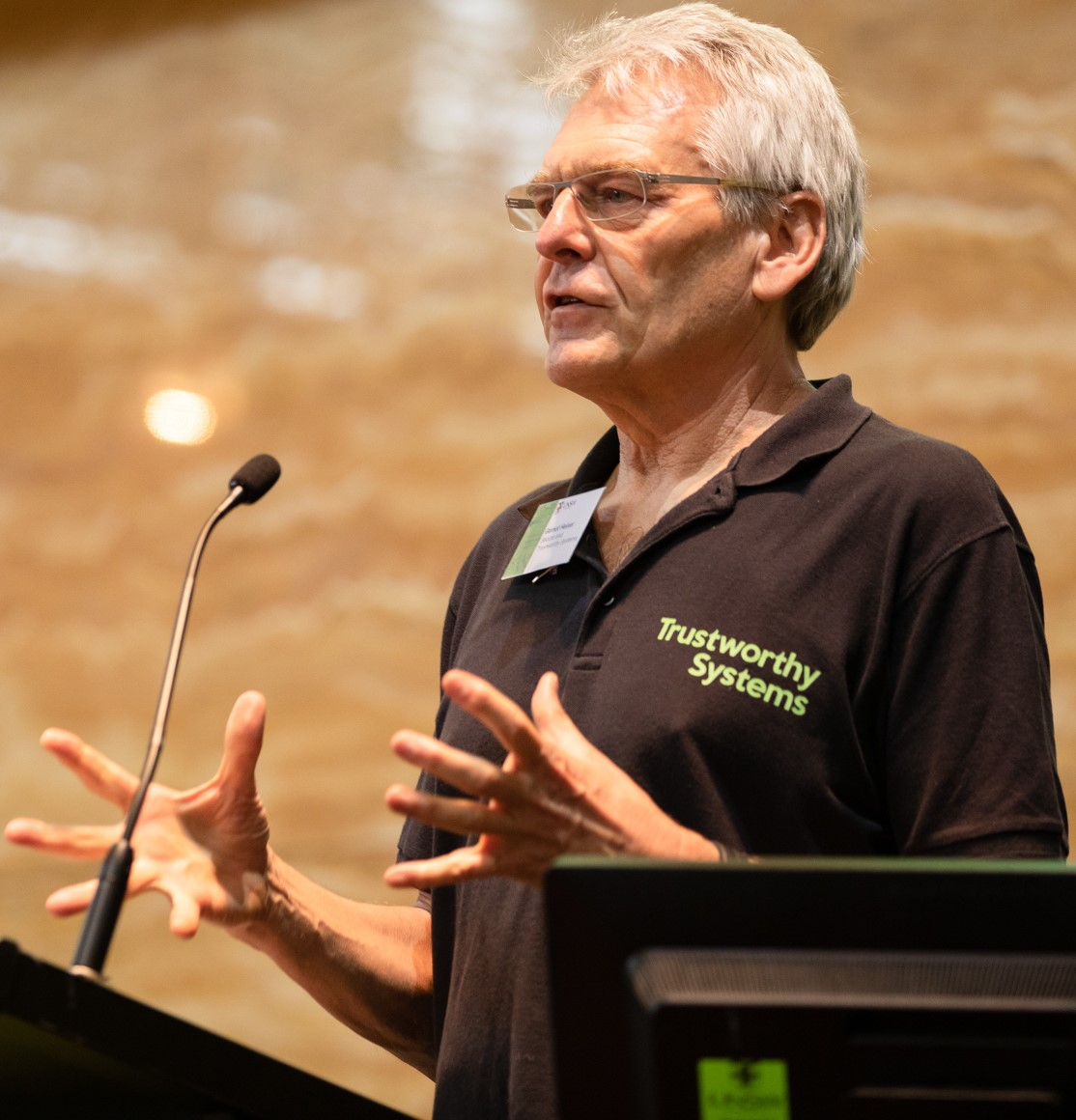
- Gernot Heiser speaking at the UNSW CSE Research Expo 25 October 2022
- Born: 1957 (age 68–69)
- Education: University of Freiburg, BSc; Brock University, MSc; ETH Zurich, PhD
- Known for: Operating system teaching, research, commercialising
- Awards: Leopoldina Member (2023); RSN Fellow (2022); ACM SIGOPS Hall of Fame Award (2019); ATSE Fellow (2016); IEEE Fellow (2016); ACM Fellow (2014)
- Scientific career
- Fields: Computer science
- Workplaces: University of New South Wales (Scientia Professor and John Lions Chair of Operating Systems); NICTA (research group leader); Open Kernel Labs (founder, former CTO, director)
- Website: gernot-heiser.org

Gernot Heiser (born 1957) is a German-Australian computer scientist. He is a Scientia Professor and the John Lions Chair for operating systems at UNSW Sydney, where he leads the Trustworthy Systems group (TS).

== Life ==
Heiser earned his Abitur in 1976 at the Markgräfler Gymnasium Müllheim in Müllheim im Markgräflerland.

In 1991, Heiser joined the School of Computer Science and Engineering of UNSW Sydney, originally as a lecturer, reaching the rank of full professor in 2002, a position he retains to date.

Also in 2002 he joined the newly created research organisation NICTA as one of its initial Program Leaders, in charge of the Embedded, Real-Time and Operating Systems (ERTOS) program. After a re-organisation in 2011 ERTOS became the Software Systems Research Group (SSRG) which he led. When NICTA was absorbed into CSIRO in 2016, Heiser stepped back from management of the group, which was then called Trustworthy Systems (TS). In 2021 CSIRO abandoned TS, at which time Heiser took the group back to UNSW and re-assumed its leadership.

Since April 2020, Heiser serves as the Founding Chairman of the seL4 Foundation.

== Research ==
Heiser's research focuses on microkernels, microkernel-based systems, and virtual machines, and emphasizes performance and reliability.

His group produced Mungi, a single address space operating system, for clusters of 64-bit computers, and implementations of the L4 microkernel with very fast inter-process communication. His Gelato@UNSW team was a founding member of the Gelato Federation, and focused on performance and scalability of Linux on Itanium. They established theoretical and practical performance limits of message passing inter-process communication (IPC) on Itanium.

After joining NICTA at its creation in 2002, his research shifted away from high-end computing platforms, and toward embedded systems, with the aim of improving security, safety, and reliability via use of microkernel technology. This led to the development of a new microkernel, called seL4, and its formal verification, claimed to be the first-ever complete proof of the functional correctness of a general-purpose OS kernel.

His work on virtualization was motivated by the need to provide a complete OS environment on his microkernels. His Wombat project followed the approach taken with the L4Linux project at Dresden, but was a multi-architecture paravirtualized Linux running on x86, ARM and MIPS hardware. The Wombat work later formed the basis for the OKL4 hypervisor of his company Open Kernel Labs (OK Labs). The desire to reduce the engineering effort of paravirtualization led to the development of the soft layering approach of automated paravirtulization which was demonstrated on x86 and Itanium hardware. His work on virtual non-uniform memory access (vNUMA) demonstrated a hypervisor which presents a distributed system as a shared-memory multiprocessor as a possible model for many-core chips with large numbers of processor cores.

Device drivers are another focus of his work, including the first demonstration of user-mode drivers with a performance overhead of less than 10%, an approach to driver development that eliminates most typical driver bugs by design, device drivers produced from device test benches, and a demonstration of the feasibility of generating device drivers automatically from formal specifications. He also conducted research on operating-system-level energy management.

Since leaving OK Labs in 2010 he focussed almost exclusively on seL4 and high-assurance seL4-based systems, both in research and in technology transfer. Notable research achievements include sound and complete worst-case execution-time (WCET) analysis of seL4, claimed to be the first ever such analysis for a protected-mode OS kernel. His work on extending seL4’s functionality to support mixed-criticality systems (MCS) led to making time a first-class resource in seL4’s capability system.

Focussing on microarchitectural timing channels, he demonstrated in 2015 the first practical cross-core timing side channel attack. This led to work on the systematic prevention of timing-channel leakage, and the proposal of a set of mechanisms for achieving this, collectively referred as time protection.

In the past, he also worked on semiconductor device simulation, where he pioneered use of multi-dimensional modeling to optimize silicon-based solar cells.

== Awards and honours ==
- German National Academy of Sciences Leopoldina (Leopoldina) (Member) (2023)
- The Royal Society of New South Wales (RSN) (Fellow) (2022)
- Association for Computing Machinery (ACM) Distinguished Speaker (2021)
- ACM SIGOPS Together with his co-authors (he was 3rd author) Heiser received the Hall of Fame Award (2019), for the paper "seL4: Formal Verification of an OS Kernel"
- Australian Academy of Technology and Engineering (ATSE) Fellow (2016)
- Institute of Electrical and Electronics Engineers (IEEE) Fellow (2016) "For contributions to security and safety of operating systems"
- Australian Computer Society (ACS) ICT Researcher of the Year (2015)
- Association for Computing Machinery (ACM) Fellow (2014) "For contributions demonstrating that provably correct operating systems are feasible and suitable for real-world use"
- Scientia Professor of the University of New South Wales
- 2010 Innovation Hero of The Warren Centre for Advanced Engineering at the University of Sydney
- NSW Scientist of the Year 2009 Category Engineering, Mathematics and Computer Sciences
- Best Paper at the 22nd ACM SIGOPS Symposium on Operating Systems Principles, 2009
- Best Paper at the 13th IEEE Asia-Pacific Computer Systems Architecture Conference, 2008
- Best Student Paper at the 2005 USENIX Annual Technical Conference
