= Alien thread =

Execution by one processor on behalf of another

In computing, an alien thread in a multi-processor system is a thread of program execution executed by one processor on behalf of a process running on another processor. Alien threads are implemented in the Fiasco.OC/L4 microkernel operating system.
