= Samsung SPH-M300 =

Mobile phone model

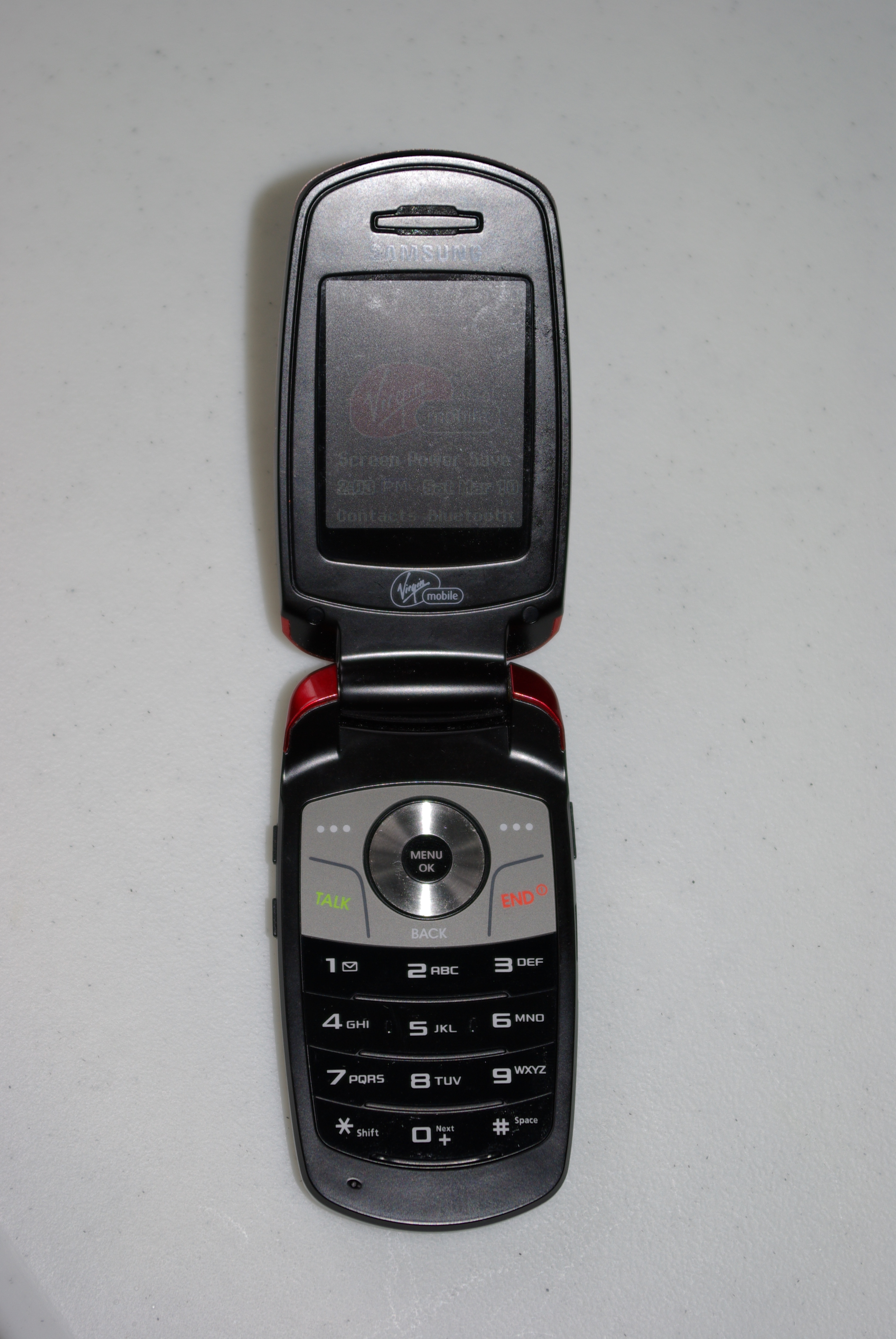
- Manufacturer: Samsung Electronics
- First released: Mid 2007 North America
- Availability by region: North America May 17, 2007; 19 years ago Sprint
- Compatible networks: CDMA2000 1X (Sprint, Virgin Mobile Canada, Bell Mobility, PC Mobile)
- Form factor: clamshell
- Dimensions: 3.5”x1.9”x0.7” - 91.0mm x 47.0mm x 17.5mm
- Weight: 2.6 oz - 85 g
- Operating system: REX OS
- Memory: 4 MB
- Storage: 614KB, 299 contact entries
- Removable storage: No
- Battery: lithium ion
- Rear camera: 0.3-megapixel 640x480 maximum (also 224x168, 320x240)
- Front camera: No
- Display: LCD TFT 2 inch 128x160
- External display: LCD CSTN 1 inch 96x96
- Connectivity: USB 2.0, Bluetooth DUN, OPP/FTP, HFP, HSP
- Made in: Korea
- Other: SMS, GPS, voice recognition, Bluetooth, WAP 2.0 Web Browser, Java MIDP1.0
- Website: http://www.samsung.com

The Samsung SPH-M300 is a flip or clamshell style cell phone introduced in mid-2007 as a basic, low cost camera phone with limited multimedia capability for the North American market. The SPH-M300 is a personal digital assistant (PDA - as designated by the SPH model prefix) style handset with basic contact directory, notes, calendar, and other typical PDA functions and is also capable of rudimentary Web browsing, and SMS text messaging although it does not have a dedicated text keyboard.
