= Eumel =

EUMEL
- Developer: Jochen Liedtke
- OS family: L4
- Working state: Discontinued
- Initial release: 1979; 46 years ago
- Marketing target: 8-bit computing
- Available in: English, German
- Supported platforms: Zilog Z80, Z8000; Motorola 68000, Intel 8086
- Kernel type: Microkernel
- Succeeded by: L3, L4

EUMEL (pronounced oimel for Extendable Multi User Microprocessor ELAN System and also known as L2 for Liedtke 2) is an operating system (OS) which began as a runtime system (environment) for the programming language ELAN. It was created in 1979 by Jochen Liedtke at Bielefeld University.

EUMEL initially ran on mainframes such as the Siemens BS2000. Later, it was ported to the 8-bit Zilog Z80 processor and many other computer architectures including the IBM System/370 and the Telefunken TR 440, and eventually, more recent consumer-oriented systems based on Zilog Z8000, Motorola 68000 and Intel 8086.

Compilers for other programming languages were added as well (e.g. BASIC, DYNAMO, LISP, Prolog). Application software included the relational database REMIS, the statistics package DASYS, and the eponymous word processor. More than 2000 Eumel systems shipped, mostly to schools, universities, and also to legal practices as a word processing platform. EUMEL is based on a virtual machine using a bitcode and achieves remarkable performance and function. Even the Z80-based EUMEL systems provide full multi-user multi-tasking operation with virtual memory management and complete isolation of one process against all others.

One of the main features of EUMEL is that it is persistent, using a fixpoint/restart logic. This means that if the OS crashes, or the power fails, a user loses only a few minutes of work: on restart they continue working from the prior fixpoint with all program state intact fully. This is also termed orthogonal persistence. It was achieved using copy-on-write and garbage collection among other cutting-edge programming techniques.

EUMEL evolved into the L3 microkernel and later the L4 microkernel family which is found in the baseband processor of mobile phones and also powers the secure enclave of Apple silicon processors.
