= Version 6 Unix =

6th Edition of Research Unix alias UNIX Time-Sharing System

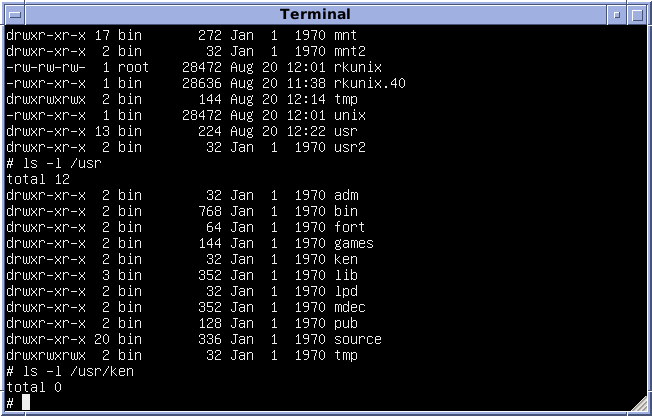
- Version 6 Unix for the PDP-11, running in the SIMH PDP-11 simulator
- Developer: AT&T Bell Laboratories
- Written in: C, assembly
- OS family: Unix
- Working state: Historic
- Source model: Open source
- Initial release: May 1975; 50 years ago
- Marketing target: Minicomputers
- Available in: English
- Supported platforms: DEC PDP-11
- Default user interface: Command-line interface (Thompson shell)
- License: Originally proprietary commercial software, now free software under a BSD License
- Preceded by: Version 5 Unix
- Succeeded by: Version 7 Unix

Sixth Edition Unix, also called Version 6 Unix or just V6 is a version of the Unix operating system first released in May 1975 and the first version of the Unix operating system to see wide release outside Bell Labs. Like its direct predecessor, the sixth edition targeted the DEC PDP-11 family of minicomputers. It was superseded by Version 7 Unix in 1978/1979, although V6 systems remained in regular operation until at least 1985.

AT&T Corporation licensed Version 5 Unix to educational institutions only, but licensed Version 6 also to commercial users for $20,000, and it remained the most widely used version into the 1980s. An enhanced V6 was the basis of the first ever commercially sold Unix version, INTERACTIVE's IS/1. Bell's own PWB/UNIX 1.0 was also based on V6, where earlier (unreleased) versions were based on V4 and V5. Whitesmiths produced and marketed a (binary-compatible) V6 clone under the name Idris.

== Source code ==
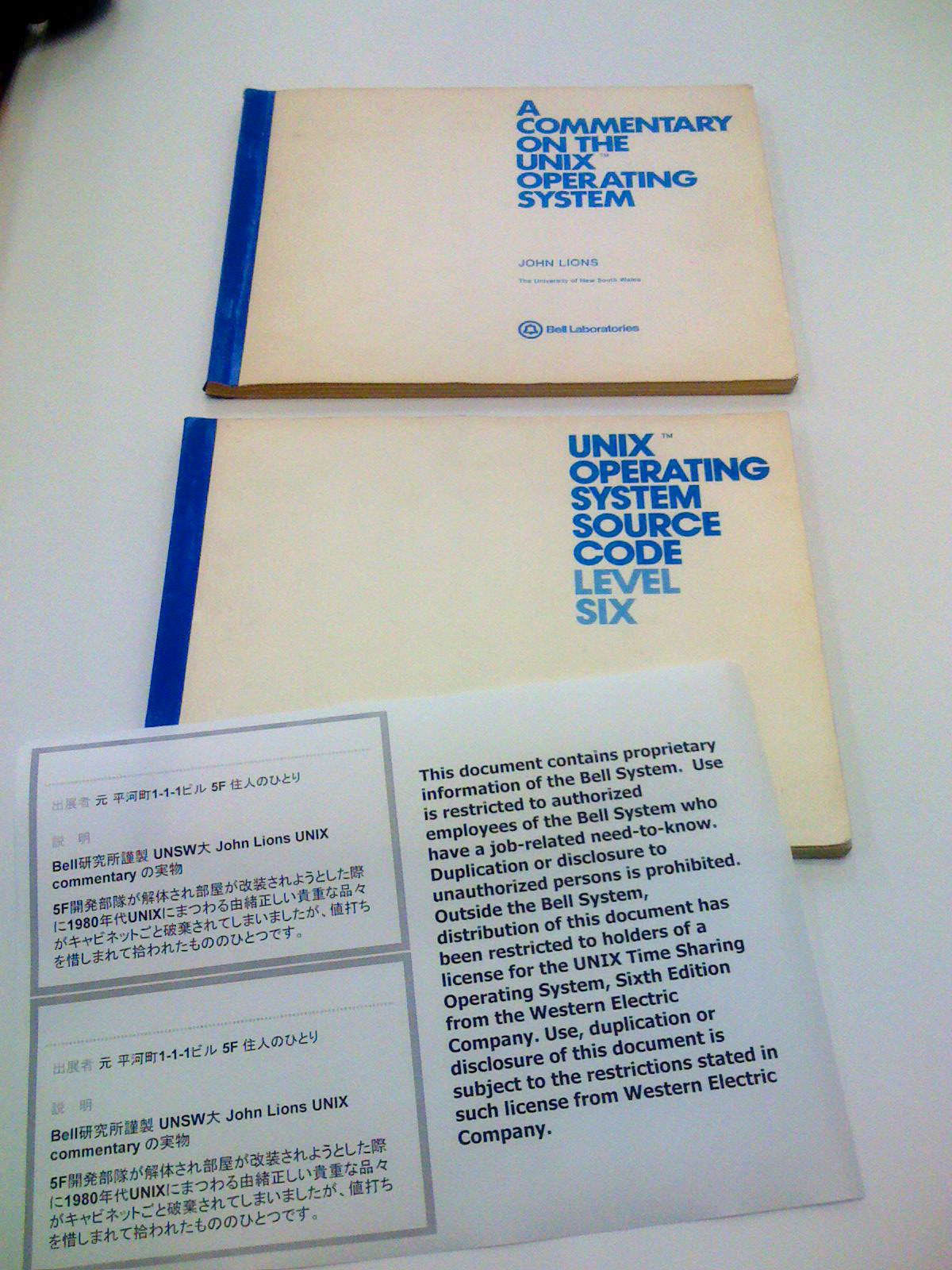
John Lions' original books, source code and commentary

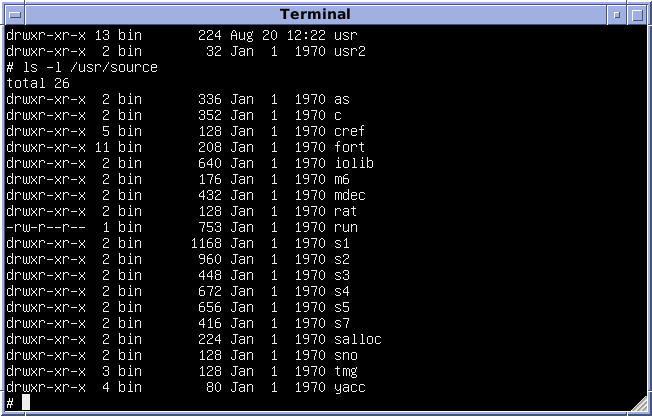
Browsing through /usr/source on Version 6 Unix, running on SIMH

V6 Unix was released as a distribution including the full source code. Since source code was available and the license was not explicit enough to forbid it, V6 was taken up as a teaching tool, notably by the University of California, Berkeley, Johns Hopkins University and the University of New South Wales (UNSW).

UC Berkeley distributed a set of add-on programs called the First Berkeley Software Distribution or 1BSD, which later became a complete operating system distribution.

UNSW professor John Lions' famous Commentary on UNIX 6th Edition was an edited selection of the main parts of the kernel as implemented for a Digital PDP-11/40, and was the main source of kernel documentation for many early Unix developers. Due to license restrictions on later Unix versions, the book was mainly distributed by samizdat photo-copying.

The source code for the original V6 Unix was later made available as free software under a BSD License from the SCO Group.

== Portability ==
Unix ran on a non-Digital computer for the first time when ported to Interdata hardware. Interdata maker Perkin-Elmer became the first minicomputer company to support Unix.

=== Interdata 7/32 ===
In 1977, Richard Miller and Ross Nealon, working under the supervision of professor Juris Reinfelds at Wollongong University, completed a port of V6 Unix to the Interdata 7/32, thus proving the portability of Unix and its new systems programming language C in practice. Their "Wollongong Interdata UNIX, Level 6" also included utilities developed at Wollongong, and later releases had features of V7, notably its C compiler. Wollongong Unix was the first ever port to a platform other than the PDP series of computers, proving that portable operating systems were indeed feasible, and that C was the language in which to write them. In 1980, this version was licensed to The Wollongong Group in Palo Alto that published it as Edition 7.

=== Interdata 8/32 ===
Around the same time, a Bell Labs port to the Interdata 8/32 was completed, but not externally released. The goal of this port was to improve the portability of Unix more generally, as well to produce a portable version of the C compiler. The resulting Portable C Compiler (PCC) was distributed with V7 and many later versions of Unix, and was used to produce the UNIX/32V port to the VAX.

=== IBM VM/370 ===
A third Unix portability project was completed at Princeton, NJ in 1976–1977, where the Unix kernel was adapted to run as a guest operating on IBM's VM/370 virtualization environment. This version became the nucleus of Amdahl's first internal UNIX offering. (see Amdahl UTS)

== Variants and extensions ==
Bell Labs developed several variants of V6, including the stripped-down MINI-UNIX for low-end PDP-11 models, LSI-UNIX or LSX for the LSI-11, and the real-time operating system UNIX/RT, which merged V6 Unix and the earlier MERT hypervisor.

After AT&T decided the distribution by Bell Labs of a number of pre-V7 bug fixes would constitute support (disallowed by an antitrust settlement) a tape with the patchset was slipped to Lou Katz of USENIX, who distributed them.

The University of Sydney released the Australian Unix Share Accounting Method (AUSAM) in January 1978, a V6 variant with improved security and process accounting, in addition to the fifty fixes that leaked out of Bell Labs. There were several subsequent releases.

Interactive Systems Corporation released an enhanced PDP-11 version for office automation called IS/1.

In the Eastern Bloc, clones of V6 Unix appeared for local-built PDP-11 clones (MNOS, later augmented for partial compatibility with BSD Unix) and for the Elektronika BK personal computer (BKUNIX, based on LSX).

V6 was used for teaching at MIT in 2002 through 2006, and subsequently replaced by a simpler clone called xv6.

== See also ==
- Ancient UNIX
- xv6 – Modern reimplementation of Sixth Edition Unix
