= L4Linux =

L^{4}Linux
- Developer: Dresden Real-Time Operating System Project
- Written in: C
- OS family: Linux kernel
- Working state: current
- Source model: Open source
- Initial release: 5 October 1997; 29 years ago
- Latest release: 7.2 / October 2026; 1 month ago
- Supported platforms: IA-32, x86-64, ARM, RISC-V
- Kernel type: Monolithic on microkernel
- License: GNU General Public License
- Official website: l4linux.org

L^{4}Linux is a variant of the Linux kernel for operating systems, that is altered to the extent that it can run paravirtualized on an L4 microkernel, where the L4Linux kernel runs a service. L4Linux is not a fork but a variant and is binary compatible with the Linux x86 kernel, thus it can replace the Linux kernel of any Linux distribution.

L^{4}Linux is being developed by the Dresden Real-Time Operating System Project (DROPS) to allow real-time and time-sharing programs to run on a computer in parallel at the same time.

L^{4}Linux also allows setting up a virtualized environment vaguely similar to Xen or Kernel-based Virtual Machine (KVM), but a few significant differences exist between the intent of Xen and L^{4}Linux.

== L4Android ==
L4Android is a fork of L^{4}Linux which encompasses the modifications to the main-line Linux kernel for Android. It is a joint project of the operating systems group of the Dresden University of Technology and the chair for Security in Telecommunications of Technische Universität Berlin.

== See also ==
- Wombat (operating system)
- MkLinux, a similar port of the Linux kernel, but to a Mach microkernel
