= REX OS =

Real-time operating system

REX Operating System
- Developer: Qualcomm
- Written in: C
- OS family: L4A Pistachio and Iguana embedded operating system
- Working state: Discontinued
- Source model: Proprietary
- Initial release: 1999; 27 years ago
- Marketing target: Smartphones
- Supported platforms: ARM
- Kernel type: Microkernel RTOS
- License: Proprietary

The REX Operating System (Real-time Executive Operating System) is a real-time operating system (RTOS) developed by Qualcomm for the ARM processor based mobile phone Dual-Mode Subscriber Station (DMSS) or Advanced Mode Subscriber Software (AMSS) development. As of 2007, most Korean cell phones ran on REX.

REX is a combination of two operating systems: L4Ka::Pistachio embedded microkernel and Iguana, with extensive modifications and extensions by Qualcomm and HTC.

Originally developed for the Intel 80186, it was then ported to ARM, and x86 architectures are no longer supported. REX is not POSIX compliant or open-source software and requires a proprietary software license from Qualcomm for use.

It seems not to be actively developed or marketed as of 2012, but is used in currently or recently sold low end cell phones, typically for use by pay-as-you-go customers, like the Samsung SPH-M300.

== Features ==
REX is an RTOS with the following features:

- Preemptive multitasking
- Task management
- Task synchronization
- Exclusive lock
- Timer
- Interrupt management
- Uses less than 5K of ROM

REX provides no memory protection features but does have memory management abilities.
