= John Lions =

Australian computer scientist (1937–1998)

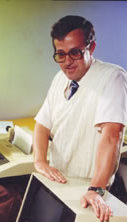
- John Lions in 1980
- Born: 19 January 1937
- Died: 5 December 1998 (aged 61)
- Occupation: Computer scientist
- Spouse: Marianne Lions
- Children: 2

Academic background
- Education: University of Sydney; University of Cambridge

Academic work
- Institutions: Dalhousie University; University of New South Wales
- Notable works: Lions' Commentary on UNIX 6th Edition, with Source Code

John Lions (19 January 1937 – 5 December 1998) was an Australian computer scientist. He is best known as the author of Lions' Commentary on UNIX 6th Edition, with Source Code, commonly known as the Lions Book.

== Early life ==
Lions gained a degree with first-class honours from the University of Sydney in 1959. He applied, and received a scholarship to study at the University of Cambridge where he earned his doctorate on Control engineering in 1963. After his graduation, he worked at the consulting firm KCS Ltd in Toronto, Ontario, Canada. In 1967, he briefly took a position at Dalhousie University in Halifax, Canada before moving on to working for Burroughs in Los Angeles as a Systems Analyst.

== Later life ==
In 1972 he moved back to Sydney, Australia and became a senior lecturer in the Department of Computer Science at the University of New South Wales (UNSW). In 1980, he was promoted to Associate Professor and apart from sabbaticals in 1978, 1983 and 1989 at Bell Laboratories, he remained at the school until retiring in 1995 due to bad health.

== Work ==
- His most famous work, the Lions Book, was written as course notes for his operating systems course at UNSW.
- Lions organised the Australian UNIX Users' Group and was its founding president from 1984 to 1986.
- Lions was involved in the setting up of an annual conference for academics, the Australian Computer Science Conference and he was the editor of the Australian Computer Journal for six years and was made a fellow of the Australian Computer Society for his contribution.

== Personal life ==
John Lions was married to Marianne and had two children, Katherine and Elizabeth.

== Contribution to UNSW ==
This commentary is included in an unofficial history of UNSW's Computer Science & Engineering by Ken Robinson (computer scientist), their longest serving member of teaching staff.

=== John Lions and UNIX ===
Also in the early seventies, the groundbreaking creation of the UNIX operating system and the C programming language by Bell Laboratories researchers Ken Thompson and Dennis Ritchie inspired programmers globally including Lecturers Ken Robinson (on staff from 1972) and John Lions (on staff from 1973). In 1973, Ken Robinson recognised the UNIX OS as "too good to be true" and acquired a copy of the system from Bell Laboratories. John Lions took over the management of the installation of UNIX on the department's PDP 11/40 computer and, recognising the importance of the accessibility of this system immediately incorporated a study of UNIX in his teaching, making significant modifications to two of his courses. In addition, he wrote the ‘Source Code and Commentary on Unix Level 6’ and handed cardboard bound copies on computer printout paper to his astonished students. Containing the entire UNIX 6 operating system, the book proved an invaluable teaching resource and a technical bible for a whole generation of professionals.

Legally, the book was only supposed to be available to licensees of UNIX 6 and by the time of the release of UNIX 7 in 1979, intellectual property laws were invoked to ban its publication. One programming student recalled, ‘because we couldn’t legally discuss the book in the university’s operating systems class, several of us would meet at night in an empty classroom to discuss the book. It was the only time in my life I was an active member of an underground.’ [Mr Peter Reintjes (BE ’xx) quoted in the Sydney Morning Herald, 11 December 1999].

In the early 1980s multiple copies of the Lion’s book were photocopied. (title) John Lions taught until 1991 and lived just long enough to see the ban on his book finally lifted in 1998. The importance of his work was recognised by the dedication on 26 June 2002 of the John Lions Garden outside the K17 building, with an annular placed around the largest tree bearing the inscription, ‘Lions’ books inspired a generation of operating systems designers.’ [UNSW Engineers, Issue 7, November 2002, p10.] At the same time, a Lions Chair in Computer Science was established, funded partly through the University, but largely through the tremendous efforts of former students who he motivated and inspired with his teaching and research and who acknowledge his defining influence on their professional lives.

UNSW had the first installation of UNIX in Australia, and was one of the first places to be using that system outside of the USA. The School of Computer Science and Engineering has continued to base a significant amount of its teaching on UNIX-like systems, nowadays Linux.

== Posthumous honours ==
=== John Lions Chair in Computer Science ===
After his death, John O'Brien, Chris Maltby, Greg Rose and Steve Jenkin, former students of Lions, commenced a campaign to raise funds to create a chair in his name at UNSW, the John Lions Chair of Operating Systems. With donations from many UNSW alumni, corporations, Usenix, Linux Australia, the chair was created in 2006, becoming the first chair at UNSW funded by contributions from alumni. In 2009, Gernot Heiser became the inaugural John Lions Chair. Of the Usenix donations, US$6,000 came from the 1998 auction of the California UNIX license plate by Ted Dolotta, won by John Mashey, who had lent his copies of the Lions books (used in Bell Labs internal courses) and never gotten back. Lions had graciously replaced them with autographed copies on an earlier visit of Mashey to Sydney. They now are members of the collection at the Computer History Museum.

=== John Lions Garden ===
In 2002, UNSW dedicated the John Lions Garden in front of the new Computer Science and Engineering building to Lions' memory.

=== John Lions Award for Contribution to Open Software ===
In 2011, The School of Computer Science and Engineering at UNSW initiated the John Lions Award for Contribution to Open Software. The Prize is open to high school and undergraduate university students enrolled in an Australian secondary or tertiary institution. Full-time and part-time students are eligible, as well as local and internationals students. The annual prize is valued at $1,000.
