= ELAN (programming language) =

Educational programming language

Elan
- Paradigms: procedural, structured
- Designed by: C.H.A. Koster, et al.
- Developer: Technische Universität Berlin
- First appeared: 1974; 51 years ago
- Typing discipline: static, strong
- Scope: Lexical
- Platform: Zilog Z80, others
- OS: EUMEL
- Website: www.cs.ru.nl/elan

Influenced by
- ALGOL 68

Influenced
- ?

ELAN is an interpreted educational programming language for learning and teaching systematic programming. (Note: In May 2023 design commenced on a new programming language named 'Elan' also designed for teaching and learning programming in schools, but it has no historical connection to the 'ELAN' language described here.)

It was developed in 1974 by C.H.A. Koster and a group at Technische Universität Berlin as an alternative to BASIC in teaching, and approved for use in secondary schools in Germany by the "Arbeitskreis Schulsprache". It was in use until the late 1980s in a number of schools in Germany, Belgium, the Netherlands, and Hungary for informatics teaching in secondary education, and used at the Radboud University Nijmegen in the Netherlands for teaching systematic programming to students from various disciplines and in teacher courses.

The language design focuses strongly on structured programming, and has a special construction for stepwise refinement, allowing students to focus on top-down design, and bottom-up coding.

The microkernel operating system Eumel began as a runtime system (environment) for ELAN.

== See also ==
- ALGOL 68
