= Ken Robinson (computer scientist) =

Australian computer scientist (1938–2020)

Kenneth Arthur Robinson
- Ken Robinson
- Born: 30 July 1938; Australia
- Died: 5 September 2020 (aged 82); Sydney, Australia
- Education: University of Sydney (Australia)
- Known for: Software engineering, formal methods, B-Method
- Awards: University of New South Wales Vice-Chancellor's Award for Teaching Excellence (1990)
- Scientific career
- Fields: Computer science
- Workplaces: University of New South Wales (Australia)

Kenneth ("Ken") Arthur Robinson (30 July 1938 – 5 September 2020) was an Australian computer scientist. He has been called "The Father of Formal Methods in Australia".

== Early life and education ==
Ken Robinson was born in 1938. He received his BE degree in electrical engineering in 1959 and a BSc degree in physics and mathematics in 1961, both from the University of Sydney.

== Career ==
Robinson worked at the University of New South Wales (UNSW) from 1965 to 2012, initially in the Department of Electronic Computation under Professor Murray Allen. During 1987–1989 he was Head of the Department of Computer Science and during 1996–2000 he was Head of the Department of Software Engineering. He held visiting positions in the United Kingdom at the University of Southampton (1978–79), the Programming Research Group at Oxford University as a visiting fellow at Wolfson College (1985–86), the Oxford University Computing Laboratory and B-Core (1999), and Royal Holloway College (University of London) and the University of Surrey (2003).

In 1971, Robinson's courses in computer science included ALGOL W (from Stanford University), WATFOR (a student version of FORTRAN from the University of Waterloo), Plago (PL/I for students, from Brooklyn), SNOBOL (from Bell Labs), and IBM System/360 assembly language. The latter used an assembler program written by Robinson since the IBM assembler was too slow for student use.

In 1974, the Department of Computer Science at UNSW had a PDP-11/40 minicomputer from Digital Equipment Corporation, used for teaching and administration. Ken Robinson wrote to Dennis Ritchie at Bell Labs requesting a copy of the Unix operating system. This arrived in 1975, making UNSW the first university outside the United States to run Unix regularly.

Robinson's later research and teaching was especially centred around formal methods, particularly the B-Method, Event-B, and the Rodin tool.

Robinson designed the initial BE Software Engineering program at UNSW and with the program coordinator subsequently. He also initiated the BE Computer Engineering program. In 1990, he received the University of NSW Vice-Chancellor's Award for Teaching Excellence.

== Personal life and death ==
Robinson died on 5 September 2020. He was married with a family.

== Selected publications ==
- Morgan, C. C.; Robinson, K. A. (September 1987). "Specification statements and refinement". IBM Journal of Research and Development. 31 (5): 546–555. doi:10.1147/rd.315.0546.
- Carrington, D. A.; Robinson, K. A. (January 1991). "Refinement of two graph problems". In Morris, Joseph M.; Shaw, Roger C. (eds.). 4th Refinement Workshop. Workshops in Computing. Springer-Verlag. pp. 241–257.
- Bert, Didier; Bowen, Jonathan P.; Henson, Martin C.; Robinson, Ken, eds. (2002). ZB 2002: Formal Specification and Development in Z and B. Lecture Notes in Computer Science. Vol. 2272. Springer. ISBN 3-540-43166-7.
- Schneider, Steve A.; Hoang, Thai Son; Robinson, Ken; Treharne, Helen (2006). "Tank monitoring: a pAMN case study" (PDF). Formal Aspects of Computing. 18 (3): 308–328. doi:10.1007/s00165-006-0004-5. S2CID 93435.

=== Online ===
- Reasons for Software Engineering Program Proposal (Ken Robinson, UNSW 1990's)
- 40 Years at UNSW and the Birth of CSE, A Search for a Discipline (Ken Robinson, UNSW, 28 January 28, 2011)
- Draft Computer Science and Engineering Timeline 1955 – 2007, Revision date: March 19 19:43 (Ken Robinson, UNSW, 19 March 2007)
- Reasons for need for Computer Engineering program (Ken Robinson, UNSW, circa 1988)

== See also ==
- UNSW School of Computer Science and Engineering
