= A Commentary on the UNIX Operating System =

1976 book by John Lions

A commentary on the Unix operating system
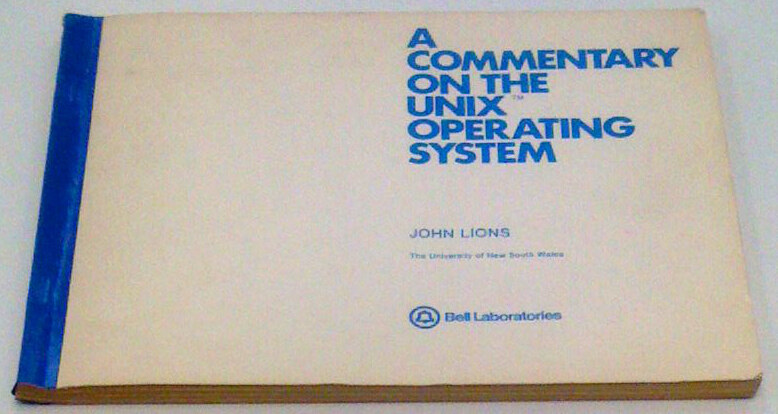
- Author: John Lions
- Language: English; also available in Chinese and Japanese
- Subject: Unix operating system
- Genre: Computer Science
- Publisher: University of New South Wales
- Publication date: 1976
- Publication place: Australia (original); United States (1996 reprint)
- OCLC: 36099640
- Dewey Decimal: 005.43
- LC Class: QA 76.76 .O63 L56

A Commentary on the Sixth Edition UNIX Operating System by John Lions (later reissued as Lions' Commentary on UNIX 6th Edition and commonly referred to as the Lions Book) is a highly influential 1976 publication containing analytical commentary on the source code of the 6th Edition Unix computer operating system "resident nucleus" (i.e., kernel) software, plus copy formatted and indexed by Lions, of said source code obtained from the authors at AT&T Bell Labs.

Itself an exemplar of the early success of UNIX as portable code for a publishing platform, Lions's work was typeset using UNIX tools, on systems running code ported at the University, similar to that which it documented.

It is suspected to be the most frequently photocopied book in computer science. Despite its age, Lions's book is still considered an excellent commentary on simple, high quality code.

Lions's work was most recently reprinted in 1996 by Peer-To-Peer Communications, and has been circulated, recreated or reconstructed variously in a number of media by other parties.

== History ==
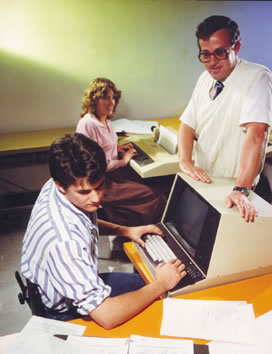
John Lions with his students in 1980

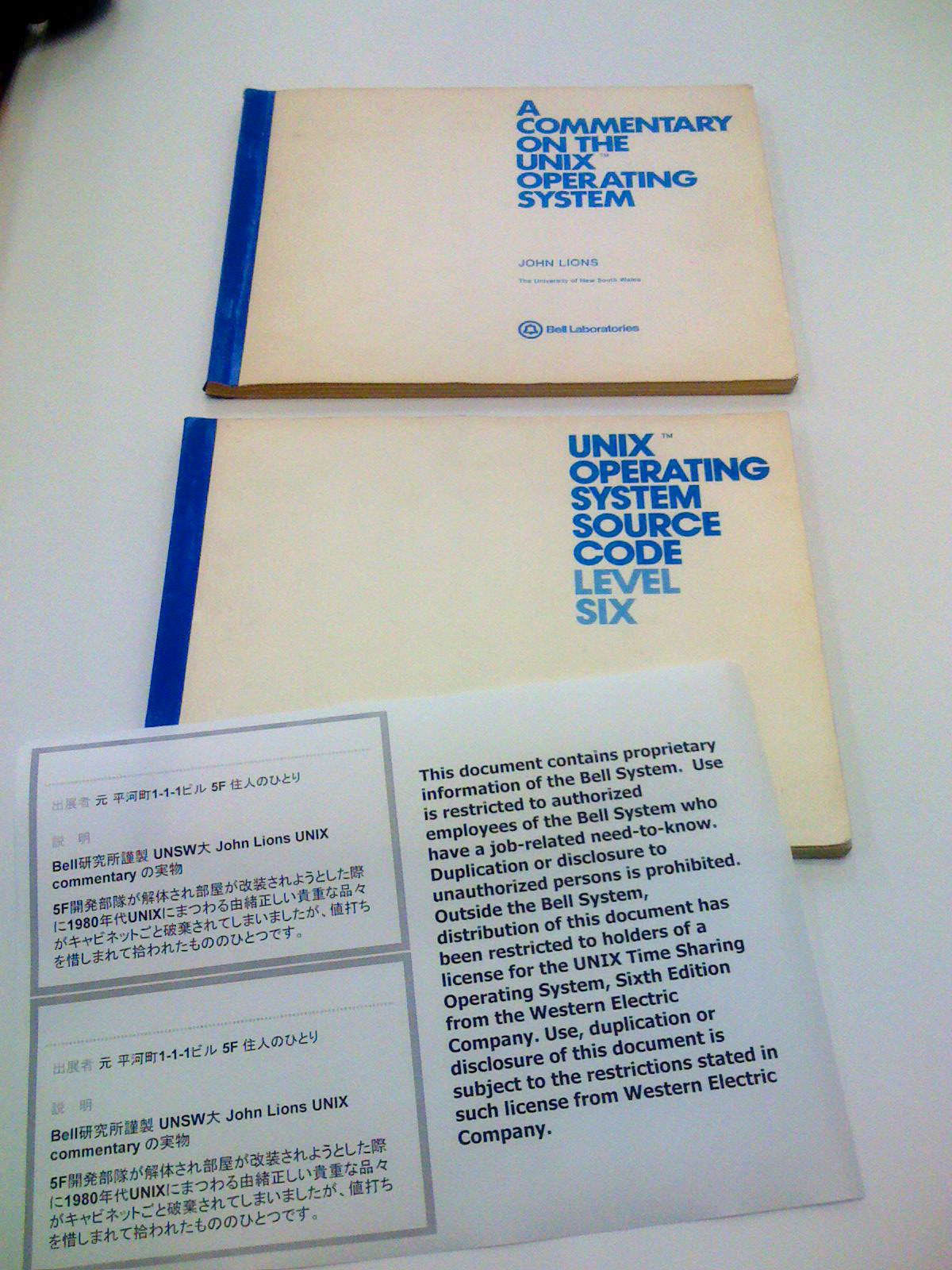
A Japanese reprinting of A Commentary on the UNIX Operating System, and accompanying formatted source code, with accompanying license

The source code and commentary were printed in book form in 1977, after first being assembled in May 1976, as a set of lecture notes for Lions's computer science courses (6.602B and 6.657G, mentioned in the introduction of the book) at the University of New South Wales.

UNSW had obtained UNIX source code in 1975, in response to Ken Robinson's 1974 query to Dennis Ritchie at Bell. Bell Labs was a subsidiary of AT&T, due to the 1956 Consent Decree AT&T was not permitted to conduct business in any other field hence couldn't sell the software, though it was required, paradoxically, to license its inventions, such as Unix and the transistor. Western Electric, another AT&T subsidiary, administered the licensing. From 1977, with the v7 & later licenses, AT&T forbade code commentaries for teaching and allowed only one copy of the Lions Commentary, printed, per license.

The UNIX User's group, USENIX's newsletter, UNIX News, of March 1977, announced the availability of the book to UNIX licensees.

Difficulty in keeping pace with the book's popularity, meant that by 1978 it was available only from AT&T Bell Labs.

When AT&T announced UNIX Version 7 at USENIX in June 1979, the academic/research license no longer automatically permitted classroom use. However, thousands of computer science students around the world spread photocopies. As they were not being taught it in class, they would sometimes meet after hours to discuss the book. Many pioneers of UNIX and open source had a treasured multiple-generation photocopy.

Other follow-on effects of the license change included Andrew S. Tanenbaum creating Minix. As Tanenbaum wrote in Operating Systems (1987):

When AT&T released Version 7, it began to realize that UNIX was a valuable commercial product, so it issued Version 7 with a license that prohibited the source code from being studied in courses, in order to avoid endangering its status as a trade secret. Many universities complied by simply dropping the study of UNIX, and teaching only theory.

Various UNIX people, particularly Peter H. Salus, Dennis Ritchie and Berny Goodheart, lobbied Unix's various owners (AT&T, Novell, the Santa Cruz Operation) for many years to allow the book to be published officially. In 1996, the Santa Cruz Operation finally authorised the release of the twenty-year-old 6th Edition source code (along with the source code of other versions of "Ancient UNIX"), and the full code plus the 1977 version of the commentary was published by Peer-To-Peer Communications (ISBN 978-1-57398-013-5). The reissue includes commentary from Michael Tilson (SCO), Peter Salus, Dennis Ritchie, Ken Thompson, Peter Collinson, Greg Rose, Mike O'Dell, Berny Goodheart and Peter Reintjes.

== Contents ==
Lions Commentary on UNIX 6th Edition with Source Code 1996 reissue

UNIX Operating System Source Code Level Six is the kernel source code, lightly edited by Lions to better separate the functionality — system initialization and process management, interrupts and system calls, basic I/O, file systems and pipes and character devices. All procedures and symbols are listed alphabetically with a cross reference.

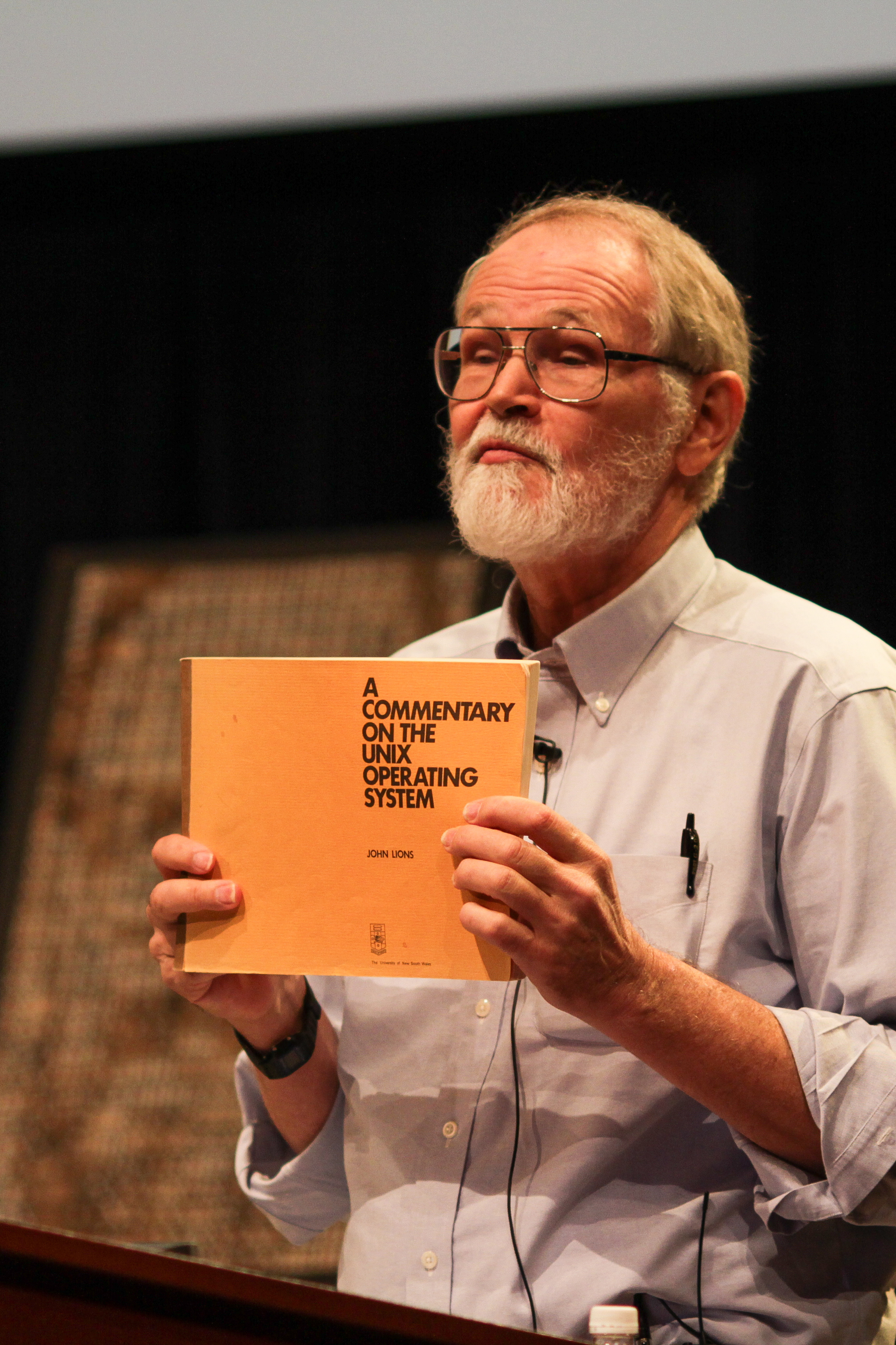
Brian Kernighan holding a copy of Lions's Commentary

The code as presented will run on a PDP-11/40 with RK05 disk drive, LP11 line printer interface, PCL11 paper tape writer and KL11 terminal interface, or a suitable PDP-11 emulator, such as SIMH.

A Commentary on the UNIX Operating System starts with notes on UNIX and other useful documentation (the UNIX manual pages, DEC hardware manuals and so on), a section on the architecture of the PDP-11 and a chapter on how to read C programs. The source commentary follows, divided into the same sections as the code. The book ends with suggested exercises for the student.

As Lions explains, this commentary supplements the comments in the source. It is possible to understand the code without the extra commentary, and the reader is advised to do so and only read the notes as needed. The commentary also remarks on how the code might be improved.

== "You are not expected to understand this" ==
The infamous program comment "You are not expected to understand this" occurs on line 2238 of the source code (Lions' Commentary, p. 22) at the end of a comment explaining the process exchange mechanism. It refers to line 325 of the file slp.c. The source code reads:

        /*
         * If the new process paused because it was
         * swapped out, set the stack level to the last call
         * to savu(u_ssav).  This means that the return
         * which is executed immediately after the call to aretu
         * actually returns from the last routine which did
         * the savu.
         *
         * You are not expected to understand this.
         */
        if(rp->p_flag&SSWAP) {
                rp->p_flag =& ~SSWAP;
                aretu(u.u_ssav);
        }

A major reason why this piece of code was hard to understand was that it depended on a quirk of the way the C compiler for the PDP-11 saved registers in procedure calls. This code failed when ported to other machines and had to be redesigned in Version 7 UNIX. Dennis Ritchie later explained the meaning of this remark:

"You are not expected to understand this" was intended as a remark in the spirit of "This won't be on the exam", rather than as an impudent challenge.

== See also ==
- xv6 – Modern reimplementation of Sixth Edition Unix
