= NICTA =

Australian governmental research organization

- NICTA logo
- Type: Company limited by guarantee
- Industry: Information and communications technology research
- Founded: 2002; 24 years ago
- Defunct: 2015; 11 years ago
- Fate: Defunded, then merger with CSIRO
- Headquarters: Sydney, Australia
- Revenue: 3,366,000 Australian dollar (2023)
- Total assets: 4,226,000 Australian dollar (2023)
- Number of employees: 300
- Website: nicta.com.au

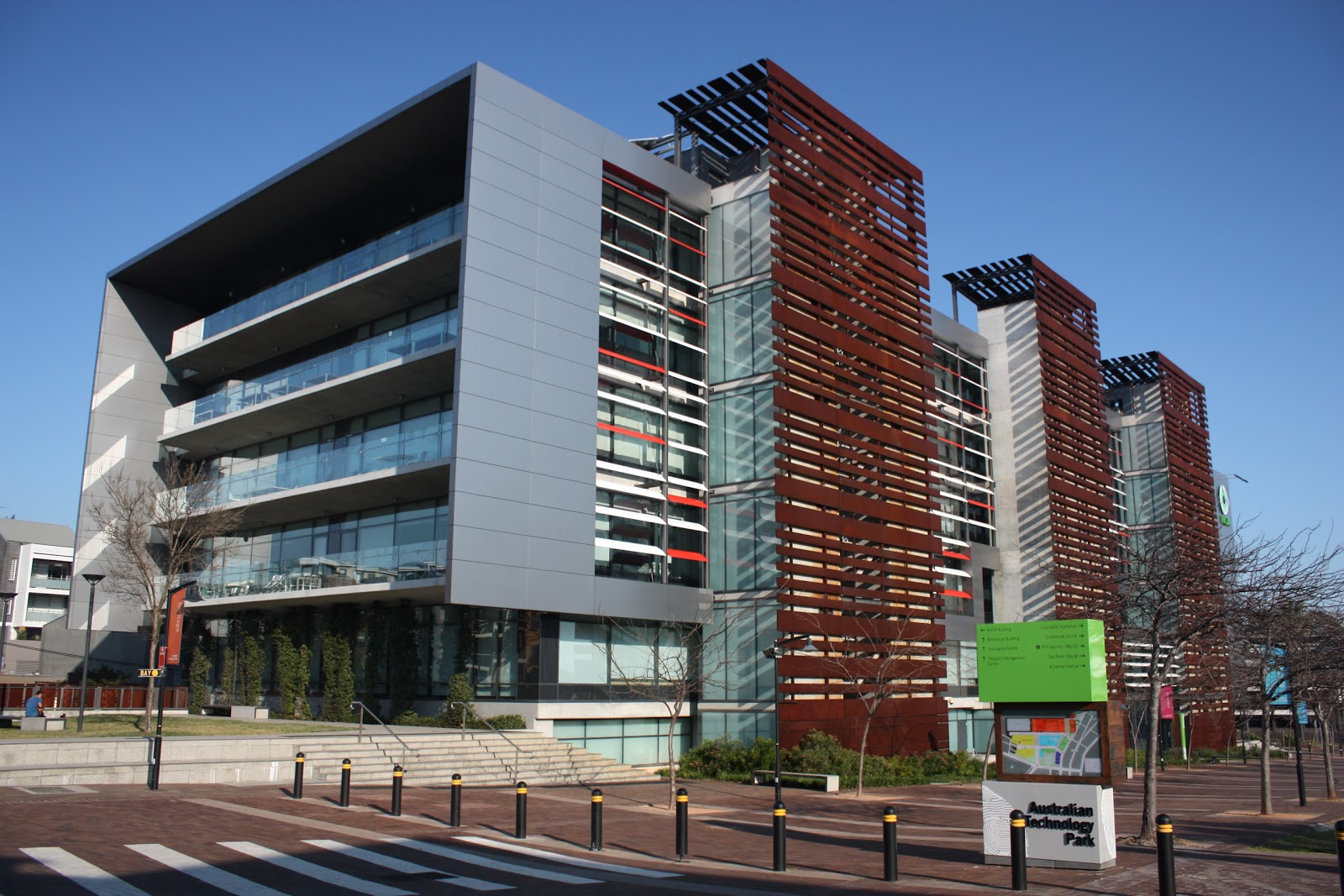
NICTA's headquarters at the Australian Technology Park (ATP).

NICTA (formerly named National ICT Australia Ltd) was Australia's Information and Communications Technology (ICT) Research Centre of Excellence and is now known as CSIRO's Data61. The term "Centre of Excellence" is common marketing terminology used by some Australian government organisations for titles of science research groups. NICTA's role was to pursue potentially economically significant ICT related research for the Australian economy.

NICTA was structured around groups focused primarily on pure research and implementing those ideas within business teams. When its funding ceased, NICTA merged with Commonwealth Scientific and Industrial Research Organisation (CSIRO) to form a new entity named CSIRO's Data61 on 28 August 2015.

== History ==
In 2002, NICTA won a competitive selection process to be established as Australia's national centre of excellence in information and communications technology (ICT) research, under an Australian Government policy initiative to promote science and innovation called Backing Australia's Ability. The creation of the centre was intended to address a formerly identified weakness in long-term strategic ICT research in Australia. NICTA was officially opened on 27 February 2003.

The founding members of NICTA were the University of New South Wales, Australian National University, the Government of New South Wales (NSW), and the Australian Capital Territory Legislative Assembly (ACT). NICTA later acquired other university and government partners. In January 2003, The University of Sydney became a partner. In July 2004, the Victoria State Government and The University of Melbourne became partners. In January 2005, the Queensland Government, the University of Queensland, Griffith University, and the Queensland University of Technology became partners. The University of Melbourne and the Victoria State Government became members in May 2011.

Since foundation NICTA created more than six new companies, collaborated on joint projects with a range of ICT industries, developed a substantial technology and intellectual property portfolio and supplied new expertise to the ICT industry through a NICTA-supported PhD program.

Australian Federal Government funding of NICTA was due to expire in June 2016 and there was a concerted effort to secure a merger with CSIRO. This merger was to be with the CSIRO Digital Productivity Flagship and there was the potential for up to 200 redundancies due to funding cuts to both organisations. This merger was realised in due course as the option of last resort as NICTA lost all Federal funding and CSIRO had significant cuts.

Duane Zitzner (who replaced Hugh F. Durrant-Whyte as CEO in December 2014 after Durrant-Whyte resigned suddenly due to a disagreement with the NICTA Board) left NICTA at the end of May 2015 in the hope that the merger with CSIRO would be completed by the end of June 2015. As of August 2015, the merger had not been finalized and Professor Robert (Bob) Williamson (who also headed NICTA's Machine Learning Research Group) was acting and terminal CEO.

NICTA formally merged with CSIRO to form a new entity called CSIRO's Data61 on 28 August 2015. Mr Adrian Turner was appointed to head the merged unit. He reported to a Deputy Chief Executive of CSIRO and had the positional equivalence of a CSIRO CEO.

== Organisation ==
NICTA research was focused in five scale Research Groups:

- Software Systems
- Mobile Systems
- Machine Learning
- Computer Vision
- Optimisation

NICTA focused on potential economic opportunities that related to the use of information and communication technology. NICTA was primarily funded by government and engaged in additional industry partnerships to augment its base funding. These included start-up corporations or other Australian government funds.

Four NICTA business teams were responsible for determining potential commercial or economic outcomes in the following domains for ICT:

- Broadband and the digital economy
- Infrastructure, transport and logistics
- Security
- Environment

Also, the Engineering and Technology Development team helps to productize research outcomes.

== Locations ==
NICTA had over 700 people (half of whom were graduate students) spread across four cities in Australia at its peak in 2012. This was drastically reduced as first the Victoria state government and then the Federal Government defunded it.

- Australian Technology Park Laboratory and Headquarters, Sydney
- Neville Roach Research Laboratory, Kensington, Sydney
- Canberra Research Laboratory
- Victoria Research Laboratory
- Queensland Research Laboratory

The Neville Roach Laboratory was moved from its standalone location onto the University of New South Wales main campus in July 2015 as a cost saving measure.

In addition, NICTA collaborated with many Australian universities and research organisations, and had smaller numbers of staff on various non-partner (and non-member) university campuses around the country.

== Funding ==
NICTA was primarily funded by the Australian Government as represented by the Department of Communications and the Australian Research Council. NICTA also received funding from industry and several state governments, and was supported by its member and partner universities.
