= Thomas Weiland =

German electrical engineer, physicist and entrepreneur

- Born: 24 October 1951 (age 74); Riegelsberg, Saar Protectorate
- Education: Technische Universität Darmstadt
- Known for: Finite integration technique
- Awards: Gottfried Wilhelm Leibniz Prize (1988); Fellow of IEEE (2012)
- Scientific career
- Fields: Electrical engineering; Computational electromagnetics; Accelerator physics
- Workplaces: CERN; University of Hamburg; Technische Universität Darmstadt; Computer Simulation Technology GmbH

Thomas Weiland (born 24 October 1951) is a German electrical engineer, physicist and entrepreneur. He is a professor of electrical engineering and headed the Institute of Electromagnetic Field Theory at the Department of Electrical Engineering and Information Technology of the Technical University of Darmstadt from 1989 to 2017. In 1988, Weiland was awarded the Gottfried Wilhelm Leibniz Prize. He was also named an IEEE Fellow in the year 2012, for development of the finite integration technique and impact of the associated software on electromagnetic engineering.

== Early life and education ==
Thomas Weiland was born on 24 October 1951 in Riegelsberg, which was then a part of Saar Protectorate. From 1961 to 1970, he attended the Ludwigsgymnasium in Saarbrücken. His thirst for research became apparent early on here, as he received six mathematics and physics prizes at state and national level while still a student. This also included several successful participations in the Jugend forscht program, which was already very popular at the time. After being accepted into the Friedrich Ebert Foundation's study sponsorship program, Weiland studied at the Technische Hochschule Darmstadt (TH Darmstadt) beginning in 1970. He graduated there in 1975 with a diploma in Theoretical Electrical Engineering.

== Scientific career ==
As a research assistant at the Chair of Fundamentals of Electrical Engineering, Thomas Weiland remained in TH Darmstadt for the next four years after receiving his diploma. In the meantime, he received his doctorate in engineering in 1977. In 1979, he joined the Theory Group at the CERN particle laboratory in Switzerland as a fellow. From 1981, he worked as a research associate at the DESY research center in Hamburg and headed the Electromagnetic Fields Group there from 1982 to 1989. In parallel, he led the Wakefield Accelerator Research Group and here he was able to eventually prove the wakefield transformation – which was previously invented by himself and G.A. Voss – with his wakefield experiment in 1987. Also within this period, Weiland completed his habilitation in experimental physics at the University of Hamburg (1984).

Furthermore, in the first half of the 1980s Weiland was a visiting scientist at scientific institutions in the U.S. and Japan several times, including Stanford University. Subsequently, he turned down several offers of professorships in Texas and Berlin, taking over as chair of Electromagnetic Field Theory at the TH Darmstadt (later renamed TU Darmstadt) in 1989 – a position he held until 2017. In 1994 and 1997, he spent two sabbaticals at Stanford University and the University of Victoria.

Starting in 2000, Weiland, together with several other professors at the TU Darmstadt, pushed a comprehensive computational engineering initiative. From 2003 to 2006, he was chairman of the board of directors of the Computational Engineering Research Center, which had been newly established the year before. In 2007, the founding of the Graduate School of Computational Engineering (Graduate School CE) followed as part of the Excellence Initiative of the German federal and state governments.

In the course of his time as professor and head of his institute at the TU Darmstadt, Thomas Weiland guided over 100 doctoral students to a successful doctorate. In turn, ten professorships emerged from the circle of these. Together with his staff, Weiland published almost 1400 scientific publications.

== Scientific work ==
Weiland's research focuses on the development of numerical methods for the computation of electromagnetic fields, with applications in electromagnetic compatibility, accelerator physics, computational engineering (computer-aided modeling, simulation, analysis and optimization), time domain analysis and simulation, as well as multiphysics simulation methods and problem solving.

Weiland had already dealt with the numerical computation of electromagnetic fields in the course of his doctorate. This was not only to shape his own career. Particularly a few years later, it should revolutionize the general approach to prototype construction within electrical engineering and have a lasting influence on it to this day. A central position of Weiland's calculations and his scientific work is occupied by his development of the finite integration technique (FIT). He first presented this in 1977, as a consistent formulation for the discrete representation of Maxwell's basic electromagnetic equations on spatial grids. Finite Integration Theory (also known as Finite Integration Technique) forms the physical-mathematical basis of simulation programs that are currently almost indispensable in the development of a wide range of technological products, such as mobile phones.

== Entrepreneurship and economic importance ==
In order to be able to use the results of his basic electromagnetic research for concrete technical developments, Weiland began in 1985 to bundle his scientific findings with regard to FIT in what was then a new type of software: MAFIA (Maxwell's Equations by the Finite Integration Algorithm), a CAD system, prepared by an international collaboration between DESY, KFA Jülich and LANL which had been initiatively set up by Weiland, quickly proved to be groundbreaking. It allowed electromagnetic fields and their interactions to be modeled and simulated three-dimensionally, automatically and so realistically on the computer that time-consuming experiments or tests during prototype construction became largely superfluous.

For continuous development and commercial distribution of his software, Weiland founded Computer Simulation Technology GmbH (CST) in 1992. CST GmbH operated in the sector of electromagnetic field simulation in the time domain, with offices in 16 countries. In 1998, the algorithms of the MAFIA software were re-embedded into CST Microwave Studio and in 2005 into the CST Studio Suite software package. Companies in various industries (such as the Bosch Group, Airbus Defence & Space, or Dentsply Sirona) use this software based on the Finite Integration Technique to reduce development effort, costs, and time to market for new products.

In the year 2008, CST GmbH was converted into an Aktiengesellschaft in which Weiland acted as chairman of the supervisory board until 2016. In the fourth quarter of 2016, CST AG became part of Dassault Systèmes SE and was thus integrated into Europe's second-largest software group after SAP. Dassault Systèmes saw the integration of the CST solutions into its existing CAD applications as a forward-looking opportunity to set a new industry standard: for multiphysics and multiscale simulation of autonomous vehicles, networked buildings, medical equipment, wearable electronic devices, smartwatches and smart textiles as well as many other objects within the Internet of Things.

Additionally, Weiland founded in 2014 Advanced Computational Engineering GmbH (ACE) together with other shareholders. ACE advises companies on the application of computational engineering methods and on related project development and study preparation. Since 2017 he has been chairman of the supervisory board of ALCAN Systems GmbH which is active in the development of liquid crystal flat panel smart antennas.

== Social commitment and Thomas Weiland Foundation ==
Weiland himself is well aware of the importance of the TU Darmstadt (former TH Darmstadt) in terms of his scientific and entrepreneurial career. He sees it as a place of autonomy and flexibility that allows scientists an extraordinary degree of freedom in both teaching and research – and to which, in his own words, he would like to "give something back" accordingly. With this in mind, following the sale of CST AG in 2016, he provided the university with a sum for a new building.

Enabling young people to study and supporting university students, respectively, is also a very special concern of his. The Thomas Weiland Foundation, which he established 2014, therefore rewards excellent school and study achievements. It currently supports around 50 bachelor's and master's students (and around 20 new ones each year) with a scholarship that largely covers living expenses throughout their studies. In 2021, an additional funding line was created for prize winners of Jugend forscht.

== Awards and honors ==
- Physics Prize, German Physical Society, 1986
- USPAS Prize for Achievement in Accelerator Physics and Technology, US Particle Accelerator School, 1986
- Gottfried Wilhelm Leibniz Prize, German Research Foundation, 1988
- Co-opted as a full member of the Academy of Sciences and Literature of Mainz, 1992
- Max Planck Research Prize, Max Planck Society, 1995
- Philip Morris Research Prize, Philip Morris Foundation, 1997
- Appointed as Honorary Professor at Tongji University, Shanghai, 2004
- Elevated as an IEEE Fellow, 2012
- Co-opted as a full member of the German Academy of Science and Engineering (acatech), 2014
