= Tanja Brühl =

German university president

Tanja Christina Brühl
- Born: 10 May 1969 (age 57)
- Education: Goethe University Frankfurt
- Scientific career
- Thesis: Nichtregierungsorganisationen als Akteure internationaler Umweltverhandlungen (Non-governmental organisations as actors in international environmental negotiations) ISBN 978-3-593-37353-9
- Doctoral advisor: Lothar Brock

Tanja Christina Brühl (born 10 May 1969 in Marburg, Germany) is a German political scientist and president of the Technische Universität Darmstadt.

A central theme of Brühl's scientific work is international environmental policy. Brühl is concerned with the importance of preserving biological diversity and the corresponding policies, agreements and arrangements at the international level.

== Early life and education ==
Brühl studied biology and social studies at the Goethe University Frankfurt and graduated in 1994 with the state examination. Her title of her thesis was "Biodiversity loss: a new problem in international relations" (German: Verlust der biologischen Vielfalt: Ein neues Problem der internationalen Beziehungen).

== Career ==
Early in her career, Brühl worked as a research assistant with Franz Nuscheler at the Chair of Comparative and International Politics at the Mercator University in Duisburg, now the University of Duisburg-Essen. From 1997 she was also active at the Institute for Development and Peace also in Duisburg and was a Fulbright fellow at the American Studies Summer Institute of the New York University. From 1999 she worked as a research assistant for Volker Rittberger at the chair of international politics at the Eberhard Karls University in Tübingen.

In 2001 Brühl returned to Goethe University and became a research assistant at Lothar Brock's Institute for Comparative Politics and International Relations. There she received her doctorate in November 2002 with a thesis on non-governmental organisations as actors in international environmental negotiations. In December 2002 she was appointed associate professor for peace and conflict research. In October 2007 she was appointed professor of political science with a focus on international institutions and peace processes.

On 29 August 2012 Brühl was elected vice-president of the Goethe University Frankfurt. She took office on 1 October 2012, succeeding physicist Roser Valenti. On 6 March 2019 Brühl was elected president of the Technische Universität Darmstadt. Her term of office began on 1 October 2019, replacing Hans Jürgen Prömel after his second term in office. With the change she also became president of the CLUSTER network. On 14 May 2025, the University Assembly of TU Darmstadt confirmed Tanja Brühl in office until 2031. She formulated networking and cooperation in research, teaching and the third mission of TUDa, as well as within TU Darmstadt, as key areas for her second term of office.

== Other activities ==
- Vietnamese-German University (VGU), Member of the University Council

== Recognition ==
In June 2008 Brühl was awarded the 1822 and University Prize for Excellence in Teaching at the Goethe University, endowed with 15,000 euros. In 2009 she was awarded the Hessian University Prize for Excellence in Teaching, endowed with 150,000 euros, for her and her working group.

== Publications ==
- Brühl, Tanja (2003). Nichtregierungsorganisationen als Akteure internationaler Umweltverhandlungen : ein Erklärungsmodell auf der Basis der situationsspezifischen Ressourcennachfrage (in German). Frankfurt am Main: Campus. ISBN 3-593-37353-X. OCLC 53848083.
- —— (1995). Verlust der biologischen Vielfalt ein neues Problem der internationalen Beziehungen (in German). Mosbach. ISBN 978-3-926979-58-2. OCLC 243805761.
- —— (2004). Unternehmen in der Weltpolitik Politiknetzwerke, Unternehmensregeln und die Zukunft des Multilateralismus (in German). Bonn. ISBN 978-3-8012-0348-1. OCLC 181437175.
