= Franziska Lang =

German art historian and archaeologist

- Born: 1959 (age 66–67); Saarbrücken, Saarland, Germany
- Citizenship: German

Academic background
- Education: M.A. (1987), Free University of Berlin; Doctoral degree (1991), Free University of Berlin
- Thesis: Archaische Siedlungen in Griechenland. Struktur und Entwicklung (1991)

Academic work
- Discipline: Archaeology
- Institutions: Technische Universität Darmstadt

Franziska Lang is an archaeologist and professor at the Technische Universität Darmstadt.

== Education ==
Lang got an M.A. from the Free University of Berlin in 1987, and a doctor of philosophy degree in 1991 from the Free University of Berlin.

== Career ==
Lang became a professor at the Technische Universität Darmstadt in 2005.

== Publications ==
- Archaische Siedlungen in Griechenland : Struktur und Entwicklung, 1991
- Das Recht auf informationelle Selbstbestimmung des Patienten und die ärztliche Schweigepflicht in der gesetzlichen Krankenversicherung, 1995
- Klassische Archäologie : eine Einführung in Methode, Theorie und Praxis, 1997
- Werkraum Antike : Beiträge zur Archäologie und antiken Baugeschichte, 2012
