= Technische Universität Darmstadt =

Public university in Darmstadt, Germany

Technical University of Darmstadt
- Technische Universität Darmstadt
- Athena, goddess of wisdom and strategy
- Former name: Technische Hochschule Darmstadt
- Type: Public
- Established: 10 October 1877; 148 years ago
- Affiliations: German Universities Excellence Initiative, TU9, CLUSTER, CESAER, T.I.M.E., EAIE, FGU, EIT, EUA, UNITE!, CAST
- Budget: EUR 546.7 million (2024)
- President: Tanja Brühl
- Academic staff: 350 professors 2,902 (2025)
- Administrative staff: 2,042 (2025)
- Students: 24,437 (winter semester 2025/26)
- Location: Darmstadt, Hessen, Germany; 49°52′30″N 08°39′23″E (inner city); 49°51′40″N 8°40′50″E (Lichtwiese)
- Campus: Urban/Suburban
- Website: www.tu-darmstadt.de/index.en.jsp
- Location within Germany Location within Hesse

The Technische Universität Darmstadt (official English name Technical University of Darmstadt, sometimes also referred to as Darmstadt University of Technology), commonly known as TU Darmstadt, is a public research university in the city of Darmstadt, Germany. It was founded in 1877 and received the right to award doctorates in 1899. In 1882, it was the first university in the world to set up a chair in electrical engineering. In 1883, the university founded the first faculty of electrical engineering and introduced the world's first degree course in electrical engineering. In 2004, it became the first German university to be declared as an autonomous university. TU Darmstadt has assumed a pioneering role in Germany. Computer science, electrical engineering, artificial intelligence, mechatronics, business informatics, political science and many more courses were introduced as scientific disciplines in Germany by Darmstadt faculty.

The Johannes Gutenberg University Mainz, the Goethe University Frankfurt and the Technische Universität Darmstadt together form the Rhine-Main-Universities (RMU). TU Darmstadt is a member of TU9, a network of the most notable German Technische Universitäten (universities of technology) and of the EU-supported European University Alliance Unite! (University Network for Innovation, Technology and Engineering).

TU Darmstadt is a location of the German Research Center for Artificial Intelligence and seat of the Hessian Center for Artificial Intelligence. TU Darmstadt is a member of the Darmstadt-based ATHENE-Center, the largest research institute for applied cybersecurity in Europe. The university is located in the IT cluster Rhine-Main-Neckar, the "Silicon Valley of Germany".

Graduates of TU Darmstadt include Nobel Prize winners, entrepreneurs, managers, billionaires and politicians. As of September 2019, the university is associated with 4 Nobel laureates and 3 Wolf Prize in Physics laureates. For several years, TU Darmstadt has been one of the universities with the most top managers in the German economy. The university is currently among the top 3. The graduates include Oliver Zipse, Peter Grünberg, Chaim Weizmann and John Tu.

== History ==
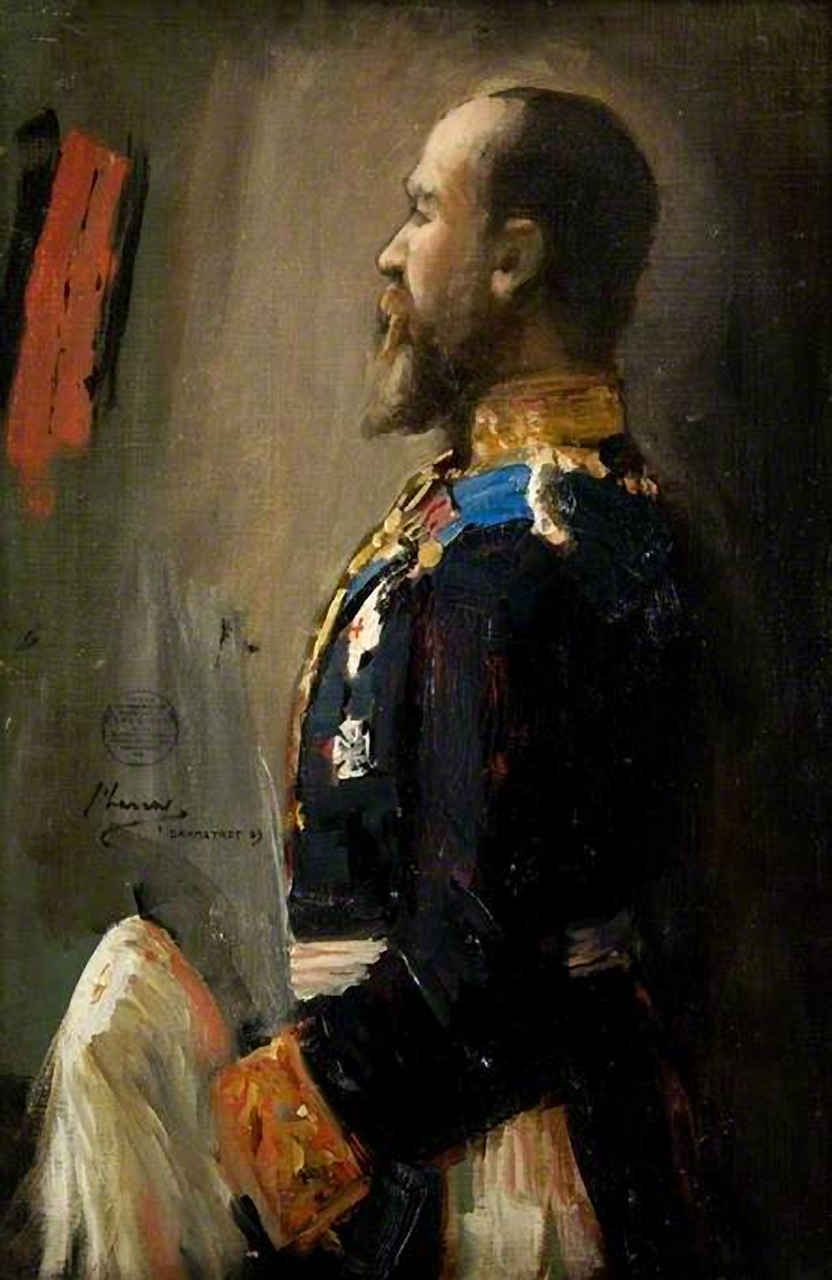
Louis IV, Grand Duke of Hesse-Darmstadt

On 10 October 1877, Louis IV, Grand Duke of Hesse, elevated the Polytechnische Schule to Technische Hochschule zu Darmstadt and thereby raised the status of this educational institution to that of a university so that the Abitur (a school leaving certificate from German Gymnasium schools qualifying for university admission or matriculation) became a requirement for admissions. In 1899, the Technische Hochschule Darmstadt was granted the right to award doctorates.

=== Early beginnings ===
The university's history is varied: its early phases began with the Höhere Gewerbeschule (Higher Trade School), which was founded in 1836 and received its own building near the 'Altes Pädagog' on Kapellplatz in 1844, followed by the Technische Schule (Technical School) in 1864 and the Großherzoglich Hessische Polytechnische Schule (Grand Ducal Hessian Polytechnic) in 1868. At that time, heated discussions were continually held in political circles on the issue as to whether such a poor state as the Grand Duchy of Hessen could afford a technically oriented higher educational institution, or even a polytechnic. After the foundation of Technische Hochschule Darmstadt in 1877, student numbers kept on being so low that in the years from 1881 to 1882 there were long debates in public about closing down the university. In this difficult situation, the local government and the university made the courageous decision to set up the first chair of electrical engineering worldwide. Thus the Faculty of Electrical Engineering came into being as the sixth faculty of the Technische Hochschule Darmstadt, which was a novelty in academia, because until then no other university had had such a faculty. This forward-looking higher education policy paved the way for Darmstadt to take up a leading position in the rapidly developing field of electrical engineering, which in turn led to a continuously rising number of students, so that the closure of the university never was demanded again.

=== First steps as a university ===
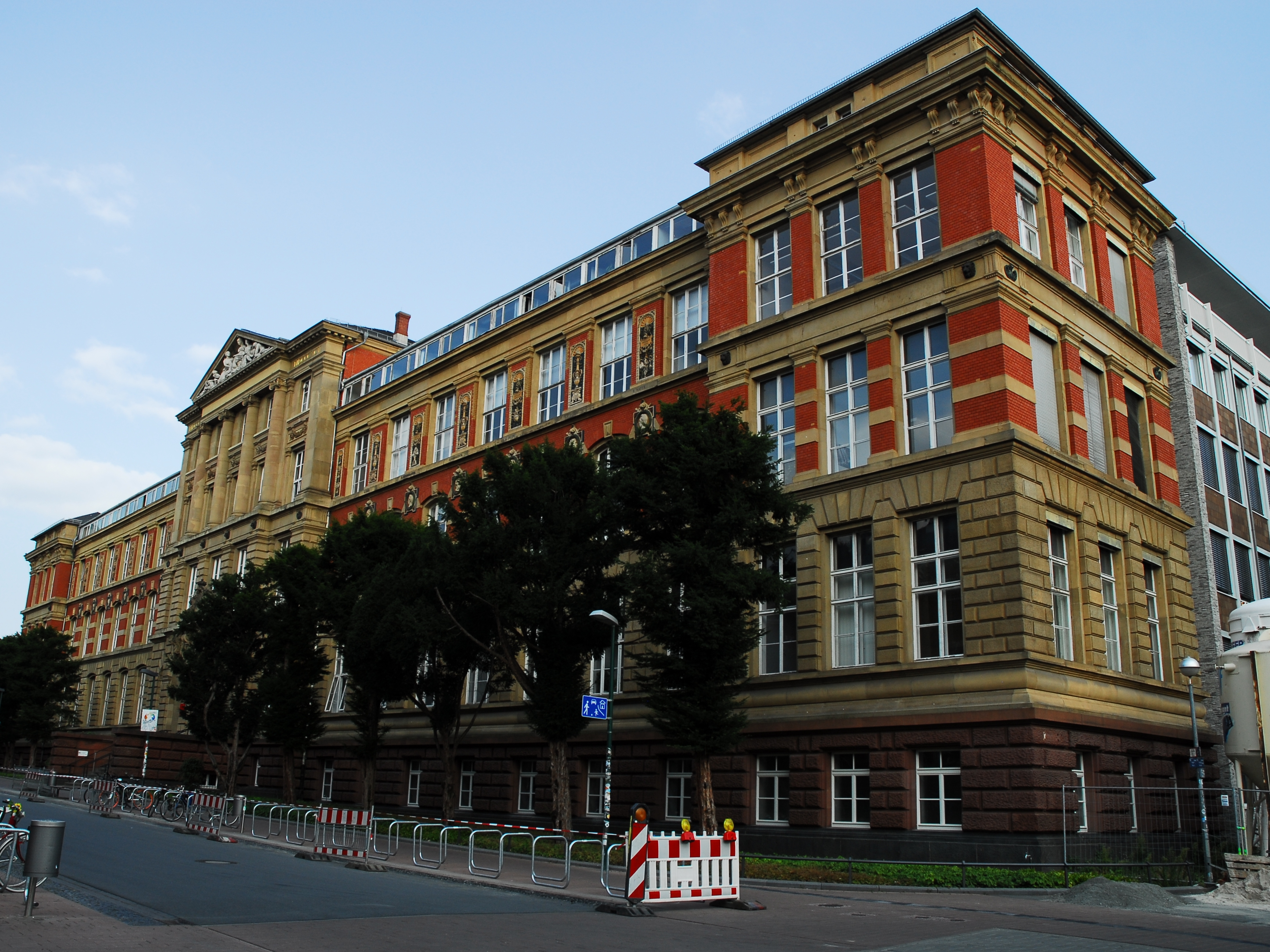
Altes Hauptgebäude (Old Main Building)

In 1895, new buildings were opened in Hochschulstrasse: the Altes Hauptgebäude (the 'Old Main Building' of the university) and an institute building directly opposite. During the two decades before the World War I, all disciplines of the university underwent diversification and expansion. New disciplines such as paper making and cellulose chemistry were introduced, and as early as 1913 a chair of aeronautics and flight mechanics was set up.

Meanwhile, the political climate had become stormier, and a growing political polarization exploded in Darmstadt over the question of foreign students. The Technische Hochschule Darmstadt had an extraordinarily large number of foreign students. In 1906, for instance, as many as three-quarters of the electrical engineering students were from abroad, mainly from states of eastern Europe.

After the World War I there was an urgent need for reform of the education system at Technische Hochschule Darmstadt, which was seen as a prerequisite for meeting the requirements of a modern industrial society. Intense discussions were held on the aim of extending the curriculum beyond the purely technical education in order to prepare the engineer for his leading role in society. A concrete step in this direction was taken in 1924, when the 'General Faculty', which until then had combined all the non-technical subjects, was divided into a Department of Mathematics and Natural Science and a Department of Cultural Studies and Political Science. Moreover, the measures taken to provide students with knowledge outside their own field of study included the upgrading of Economics and the creation of professorships in political science, history of technology and sociology.

=== During World War II ===
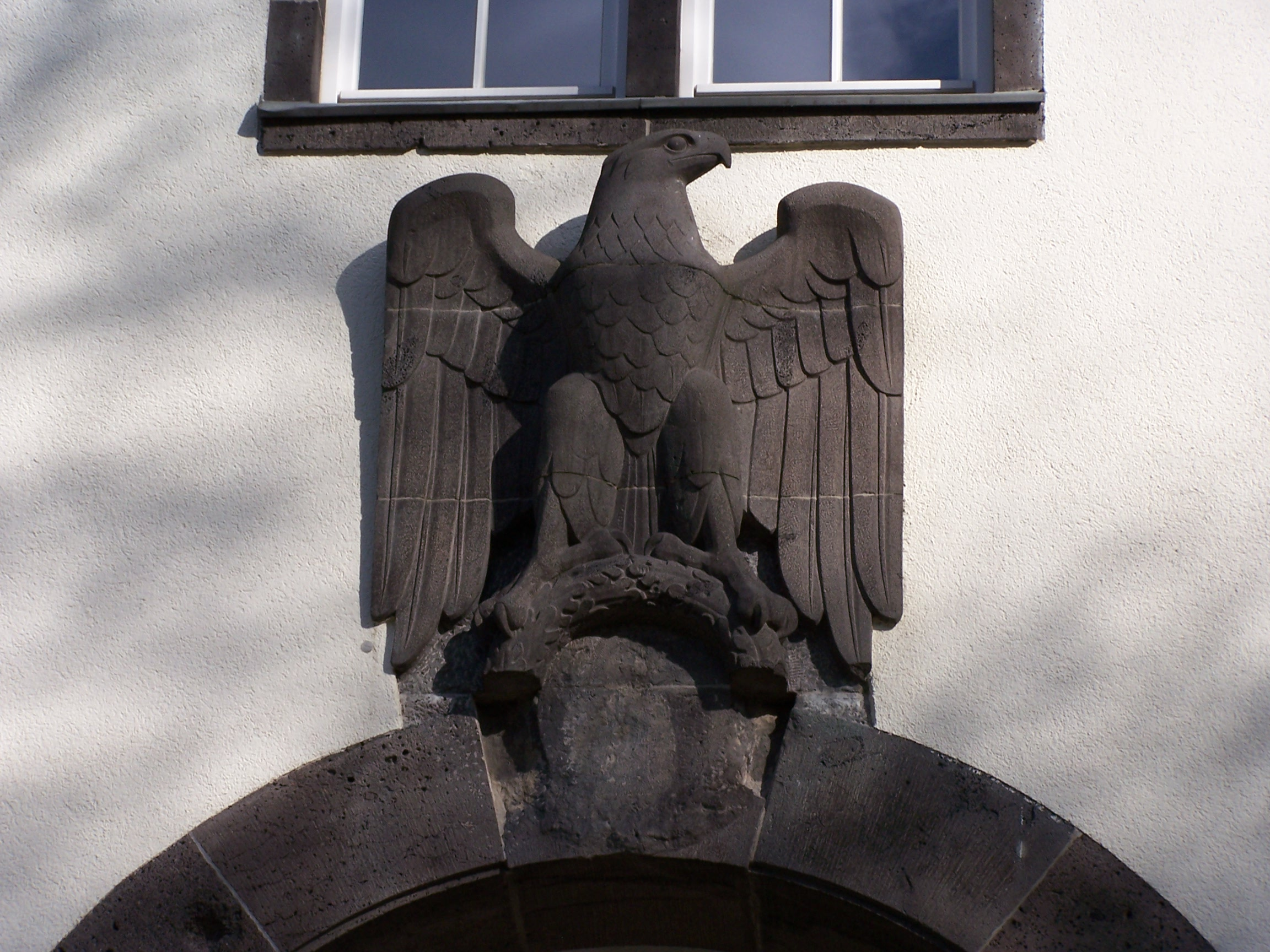
Eagle above the rear main entry to the Robert Piloty Building, nowadays home to the Department of Computer Science. Note the effaced swastika under the eagle.

Like other academic institutions in Germany, TU Darmstadt suffered an exodus of scholars following the rise of the Nazi regime in 1933. Most notably, Gerhard Herzberg, the 1971 Nobel laureate in chemistry, was dismissed from TU Darmstadt in 1934 because his wife was Jewish and emigrated with his family to Canada.

On the night of 11/12 September 1944, eighty per cent of the city, including many of the university's buildings, were destroyed during a bomb attack. For a short period in 1945, parts of the TH Darmstadt may have been closed by decree of the Allies before it was reopened in 1946. The electrical engineering department remained continuously functional, doing work under contract with the U.S. Army to build components of the V-2 guidance system. "But we have to be careful how we word this production order because we don't want the Russians to know that we are cranking up the V-2 system." In spite of the difficult post-war situation, university staff and students alike managed to settle down to university work in the severely damaged buildings, which had to be used as a makeshift solution.

=== Post World War II ===
As early as 1947, Technische Hochschule Darmstadt hosted the first Internationaler Kongress für Ingenieurausbildung (International Congress on Engineering Education), at which the participants discussed the moral responsibility of the technical intelligentsia and of the scientific elite in politics and society. In view of the disastrous consequences of the war, the participants (with the exception of the Americans, who had already contracted with THD faculty to continue weapon development), committed themselves henceforth to do research and teaching in engineering and scientific disciplines solely for the peaceful development of mankind.

1. Technical Science as Ethical and Cultural Task.
2. Present State and Tendencies of Development in Engineering Education Throughout the World.
3. Selection of Students and Social Problems.

The speech delivered by James R. Newman, Director of American Military Government of Hessen, however, made no mention of such a commitment, while stating that:

"An interchange of these [past experience], together with ideas and methods of education along engineering lines, will aid greatly, not only in the reconstruction of battle torn countries, but also in the bringing about of a universal understanding and mutual respect, and the charity which have prevented the understanding, the tolerance, the respect, and the charity so necessary for the peace, happiness, and contentment that is the dream of every human being on this earth."

The post-war period of reconstruction was largely based on a major development programme in the 1960s, by means of which universities and the state reacted to the continuously rising numbers of students. Since almost no land was available in the city centre for new construction projects, the decision was taken in 1963 to use the 'Lichtwiese' (a former airfield on the outskirts of the city) as a site for building extensions to the Technische Hochschule. Thus in the late 1960s and in the early 1970s numerous buildings, including a new student cafeteria, were erected there and ultimately became the university's second campus.

=== University reforms in the 1970s ===
After 1968 the university reform, having been initiated by the student movement, was beginning to take shape both at a national and a regional level. It aimed at creating clear university structures and the involvement of all university members in decision-making processes. In 1970 the Hessisches Hochschulgesetz (Higher Education Law of the Federal State of Hessen) came into force. These gave Technische Hochschule Darmstadt, along with other Hessian universities, a new structure based on the introduction of a presidential statute and a unified administration as well as the subdivision of the university structure into departments.

In the mid 1970s, there was another rapid rise in student numbers. Staff development, however, lagged far behind, resulting in inevitable restrictions on admission imposed either by the central government or by the university. Regardless of the staff's heavy workload, the TH Darmstadt managed to set the course for the future, as evidenced by the School of Information Science, established in 1974, the Zentrum für Interdisziplinäre Technikforschung (Centre for Interdisciplinary Studies on Technology), founded in 1987, and the Department of Materials Science, established in 1989. This department has been housed in a new building on the Lichtwiese since 1996.

=== Renaming ===
By the end of the 19th century, Technische Hochschule Darmstadt had been granted the legal status of a university, and had been offering a correspondingly wide range of subjects. For these reasons, and also with the objective of sharpening public awareness of the university's status at home and abroad, Technische Hochschule Darmstadt was renamed Technische Universität Darmstadt (which is also its official English name albeit often called Darmstadt University of Technology) on 1 October 1997. This name change was partly prompted by misunderstandings that had occurred in English-speaking countries, where Technische Hochschule had often been mistakenly transliterated as 'Technical High School', providing a totally misleading connotation.

=== Autonomy and TU Darmstadt Law ===
On 1 January 2005, the first version of the TU Darmstadt Law applied making TU Darmstadt the first German public university to be given administrative autonomy. New administrative structures were put into place, and their success is being evaluated. For instance, the university can now autonomously administer its budget and buildings. Also, the university can hire professors and negotiate their salaries by itself. Formerly this was done by the State of Hessen. The status of autonomy also allows TU Darmstadt to invest in business start-ups. The Technische Universität Darmstadt is the only German university that has legally committed itself to guarantee their students good studying conditions. The TU Darmstadt law in its current state has legal force up to 31 December 2020.

=== The university as a pioneer ===
In 1882, the Technische Hochschule Darmstadt was the first university in the world to set up a chair for electrical engineering and founded the first faculty for it in 1883. The first chair holder was Erasmus Kittler. In the same year the university introduced the world's first course of study in electrical engineering.

In 1913, the university set up the first chair for aviation and aircraft technology in Germany. The TH Darmstadt set up the first chair for scientific policy in 1951. The first chair holder was Eugen Kogon. He is considered one of the founders of political science in Germany.

The TH Darmstadt shaped the subject of corporate governance in Germany. In 1973, the university established the first chair for management control system in Germany. The first chair holder was Péter Horváth, founder of Horváth & Partners.

In Germany, the beginnings of computer science go back to the Institute for Practical Mathematics of the TH Darmstadt, which the mathematician Alwin Walther built in early 1928. In 1956, the first programming lectures and internships in Germany were offered at the TH Darmstadt. Due to the reputation that the TH Darmstadt had at the time in computer science research, the first international congress on computer science held in German-speaking countries took place in October 1955 at the TH Darmstadt. Robert Piloty, professor at the TH Darmstadt, developed the computer science courses in Germany. In 1968, the TH Darmstadt introduced a first degree course in computer science and in 1975 the first degree course in business informatics.

Artificial intelligence as a scientific field in Germany and Europe was founded by Wolfgang Bibel, professor of intellectics at TU Darmstadt. He set up a research group for artificial intelligence at the TH Darmstadt in 1988. In 1996, the first chair in Germany for renewable energies was set up at TH Darmstadt and staffed with Thomas Hartkopf.

In 2004, it became the first German university to be declared as an autonomous university.

== Academic profile ==
=== Growth in the student population ===
Following is the growth in the student population of TU Darmstadt:

=== Departments ===
Typical for a university of technology, ten out of its 13 academic departments (Fachbereiche, FB) are in engineering, natural sciences, and mathematics, while three departments are in the social sciences and the humanities. The departments (with number of the department) are:

- Department of Law and Economics (FB1)
- Department of History and Social Sciences (FB2)
- Department of Human Sciences (FB3)
- Department of Mathematics (FB4)
- Department of Physics (FB5)
- Department of Chemistry (FB7)
- Department of Biology (FB10)
- Department of Materials and Earth Sciences (FB11)
- Department of Civil and Environmental Engineering (FB13)
- Department of Architecture (FB15)
- Department of Mechanical Engineering (FB16)
- Department of Electrical Engineering and Information Technology (FB18)
- Department of Computer Science (FB20)

=== Fields of study ===
There are five fields of study (Studienbereiche), which offer interdisciplinary degree courses in which students take lectures in multiple departments:

- Computational engineering
- Energy science and engineering
- Information systems engineering
- Mechanics
- Mechatronics

TU Darmstadt offers about 100 courses of study. Beyond bachelor's and master's degrees, it also offers degree courses for teaching positions at German vocational schools and the secondary schools known as gymnasiums.

=== Research profile ===
TU Darmstadt defined three major research fields:

- Energy and Environment (E+E)
- Information and Intelligence (I+I)
- Matter and Materials (M+M).

Each of these research fields cover several, focused Profile Topic which are taken to shape the academic reputation of TU Darmstadt.

=== Research ===
At TU Darmstadt there are several Sonderforschungsbereiche (SFB, collaborative research units) as well as several Graduiertenkolleg's (graduate schools) that are funded by Deutsche Forschungsgemeinschaft. The university has attracted a considerable number of national and international research institutions to the Wissenschaftsstadt Darmstadt (Darmstadt – City of Science). Among them are:

- GSI Helmholtz Centre for Heavy Ion Research (GSI)
- Fraunhofer Institute for Secure Information Technology SIT
- Fraunhofer Institute for Computer Graphics Research IGD
- Fraunhofer Institute for Structural Durability and System Reliability
- European Space Operations Centre (ESOC)
- European Organisation for the Exploitation of Meteorological Satellite (EUMETSAT).
- ATHENE
- German Research Centre for Artificial Intelligence
- Hessian Center for Artificial Intelligence (hessian.AI)

TU Darmstadt collaborates with these research institutes on a broad basis. For instance, TU Darmstadt and GSI agreed on a strategic partnership, which includes collaboration in the establishment of the FAIR Facility for Antiproton and Ion Research.

The European Space Agency has set up a research laboratory at TU Darmstadt, ESA_LAB@TU Darmstadt. It is the first research laboratory the European Space Agency has set up at a German university.

In 2018, TU Darmstadt has won the competition of the European Institute of Innovation and Technology (EIT) and is building an Institute for Manufacturing together with 50 partners including Siemens, Volkswagen, KUKA, German Research Center for Artificial Intelligence and Volvo. There will be an EIT Manufacturing Innovation Hub at the university.

TU Darmstadt is involved in the German Excellence Initiative. This initiative sponsored the Cluster of Excellence Smart Interfaces (2007–2014), the Graduate School of Computational Engineering and the Graduate School of Excellence Energy Science and Engineering. TU Darmstadt is also partially involved with the Cluster of Excellence Normative Orders, based at Goethe University Frankfurt. In the new round of 2025, TU Darmstadt successfully applied with the clusters of excellence Reasonable Artificial Intelligence (RAI) and The Adaptive Mind (TAM). This enables it to apply for further funding as a university of excellence. From 2027, the TU Darmstadt as a part of the Rhine-Main Universities will be inducted into German Excellence Strategy of the Federal and State Governments, a competition for top-level universities research founding.

=== Cooperation with companies ===
The Technische Universität Darmstadt maintains several research collaborations with companies and research institutions. These include, for example:

- PRORETA, a research collaboration with Continental AG, whose goal is to develop driver assistance systems that avoid traffic accidents.
- With Merck Group there is a long cooperation, especial in Chemistry and material science. There is also a Merck Lab in cooperation with the chemistry department.
- Intel Collaborative Research Institute for Secure Computing (ICRI-SC), a joint institute of the Technische Universität Darmstadt and Intel, which deals with the security of system-on-a-chip platforms. It is the first Intel collaborative research center for IT security outside the USA.
- Intel Collaborative Research Institute for Collaborative Autonomous & Resilient Systems (ICRI-CARS), a joint institute of the Technische Universität Darmstadt and Intel to study the security, privacy and safety of autonomous systems that collaborate with each other.
- SAP Research, a cooperation with the software manufacturer SAP, which conducts research in various fields.

TU Darmstadt is also a member of the Competence Center for Applied Security Technology (CAST), the largest corporate network for cybersecurity in German-speaking countries.

=== Strategic partnerships ===
The Technical University distinguishes between strategic alliances, a cooperative lab and a TU Darmstadt cooperation institute in strategic partnerships.

TU Darmstadt maintains strategic alliances with the companies Merck, Deutsche Bahn, Continental, Robert Bosch GmbH and Siemens.

Cooperative Labs are research laboratories that are operated together with the partner and, as a rule, on the grounds of TU Darmstadt. The labs conduct joint and interdisciplinary research into a defined but broad subject area. Together with Merck, TU Darmstadt operates the Merck Lab, which has been investigating novel inorganic composite materials since 2006 that are suitable as printable components for electronic applications.

Selected strategic partnerships can also receive the status of a TU Darmstadt cooperation institute from the university management. Since 2012, the first TU Darmstadt cooperation institute has been the DB Schenker Lab, whose goal is to expand joint research in the fields of transport and logistics and to additionally create relevant offers in the fields of teaching, training and university marketing.

=== Knowledge transfer and business start-ups ===
TU Darmstadt has the innovation and start-up center HIGHEST (Home of Innovation, GrowtH, EntrepreneurShip and Technology Management). HIGHEST supports the development of a business model, the identification of suitable funding programs, networking with mentors, companies and investors, offers lectures and seminars on the subject of innovation and entrepreneurship and provides contact persons. In addition, there are labs at TU Darmstadt on various subject areas in which one can experiment or simply exchange ideas. The autonomy status also enables TU Darmstadt to participate in business start-ups with its own funds. In a competition, TU Darmstadt was honoured by the Federal Ministry for Economic Affairs and Energy as a founding university. The university is regarded as a role model when it comes to making start-up processes fast, simple and transparent. Since 2013, 95 knowledge- and technology-based companies have been founded in the vicinity of TU Darmstadt. The Startup & Innovation Day takes place once a year, where startups from the founding scene of the Rhine-Main-Neckar region present their innovations from a wide variety of areas and development stages. For cooperation with companies, TU Darmstadt set up a collaboration with Hessenmetall, the regional association of the machinery, electronic and automotive industry.

=== High-performance computer ===
The Technische Universität Darmstadt is one of the few German universities that have a high-performance computer. The high-performance computer Lichtenberg is named after Georg Christoph Lichtenberg and has a computing power of about 1 PetaFLOPS. For comparison, the currently fastest high-performance computer Summit owns 148.6 PetaFLOPS (As of June 2019). In 2015 Lichtenberg was listed in the TOP500 at rank 410. In 2017, TU Darmstadt received 15 million euros from the federal government and state for the expansion of the Lichtenberg high-performance computer, the Lichtenberg II. This should have more than twice the power. Lichtenberg II will be used especially in the field of computational engineering, which is a profile topic of TU Darmstadt.

TU Darmstadt is also a member of the Competence Center for High Performance Computing in Hessen (HKHLR), an association of the Goethe University Frankfurt am Main, the Justus Liebig University Giessen, the Philipps University Marburg, the University of Kassel and the Technische Universität Darmstadt. Each of the members has a high-performance computer. As a voting member TU Darmstadt represents Hessian interests in the Gauß-Allianz, the union of all supercomputers at the state level in Germany.

=== Robotics ===
The Technische Universität Darmstadt (TU Darmstadt) is also internationally known for its robot research. The search and rescue robot Hector (Heterogeneous Cooperating Team Of Robots), developed by the department of computer science, competed in the Rescue Robot League 2014 of RoboCup, the oldest and world's largest competition for intelligent robots in various application scenarios, and won the first place. The robot Hector won 1st place in the category Best in Class Autonomy, the most intelligent robot, in the Rescue Robot League in the years from 2012 to 2015 and 2018 to 2019.

In 2015, a team around Oskar von Stryk competed in the DARPA Robotics Challenge. The team made it to the final with two robots in two different teams Hector and ViGIR. Team Hector competed with the robot Johnny 05 and Team ViGIR with the robot Florian.

In 2017, the Argonaut robot, developed by a team led by Stryk, won the ARGOS Challenge for intelligent inspection robots on oil and gas platforms, which the company Total S.A. had launched. The prize was half a million euros. Argonaut is a variant of Taurob tracker and the first fully autonomous, mobile inspection robot for oil and gas plants.

In 2018, Hector competed at the World Robot Summit in Tokyo in the Plant Disaster Prevention Challenge and won 1st place. The research team of Stryk has been building the German Rescue Robotics Centre since 2018.

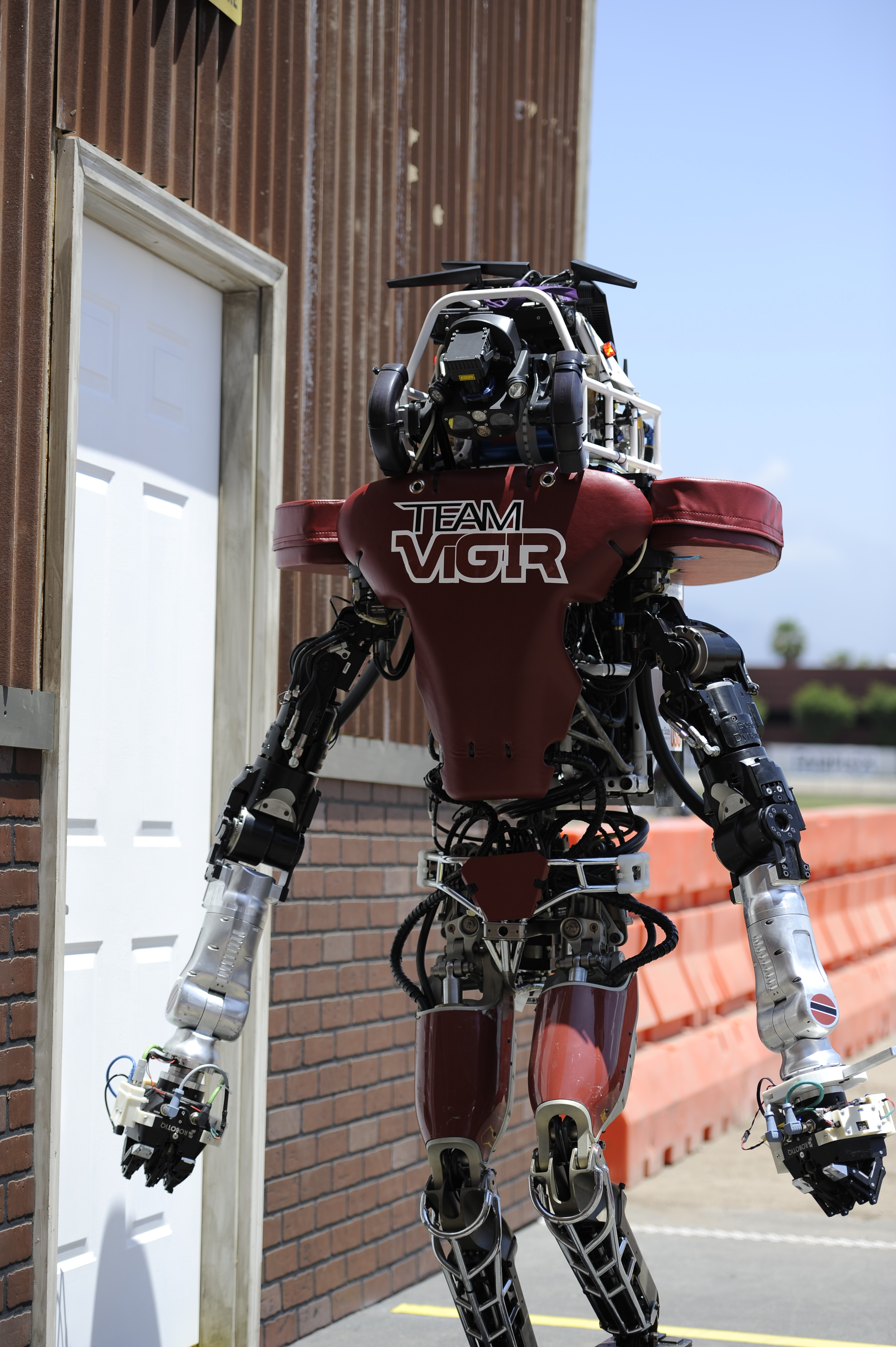
Robot Florian at the DARPA Robotics Challenge 2015

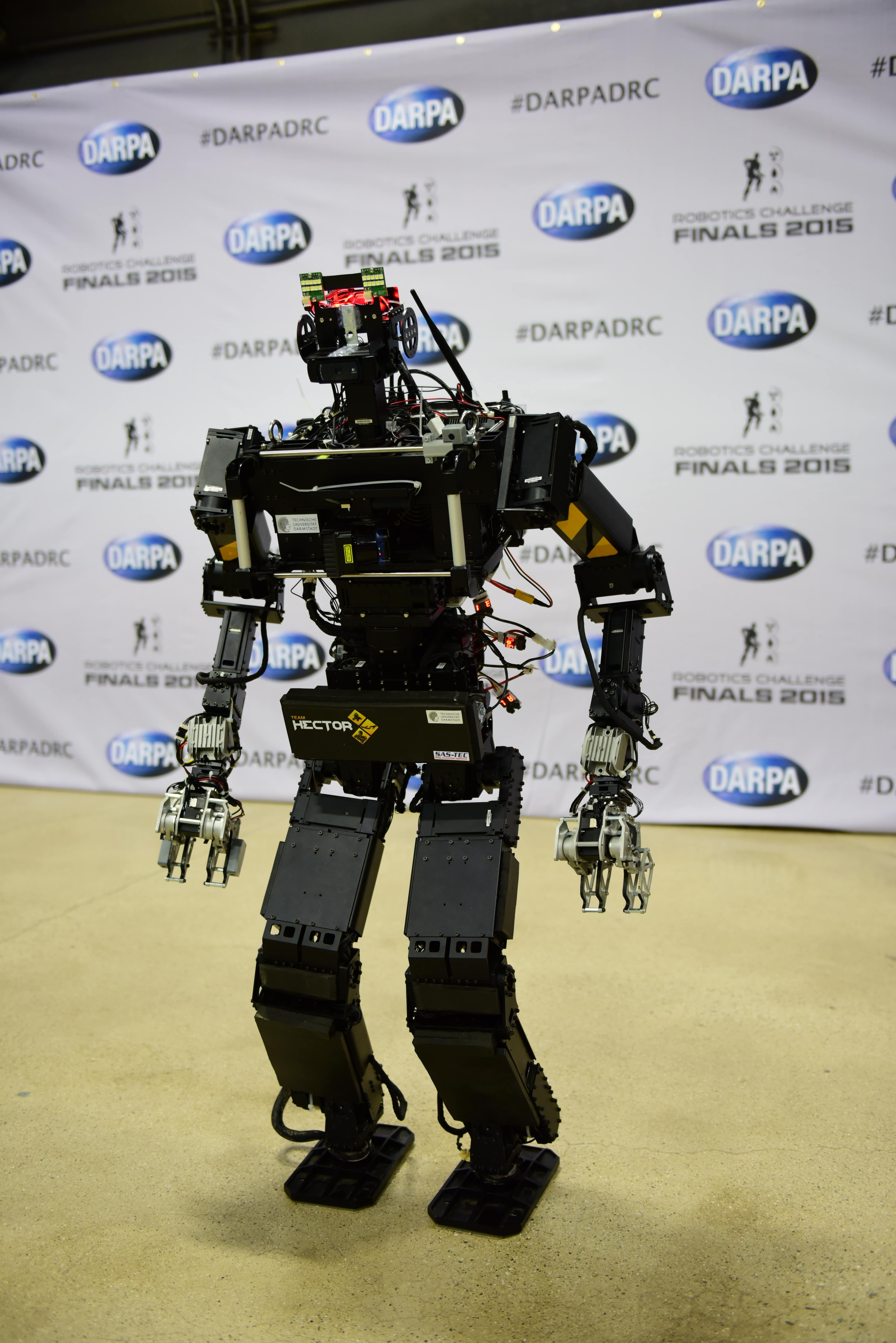
Robot Johnny 05 at the DARPA Robotics Challenge 2015

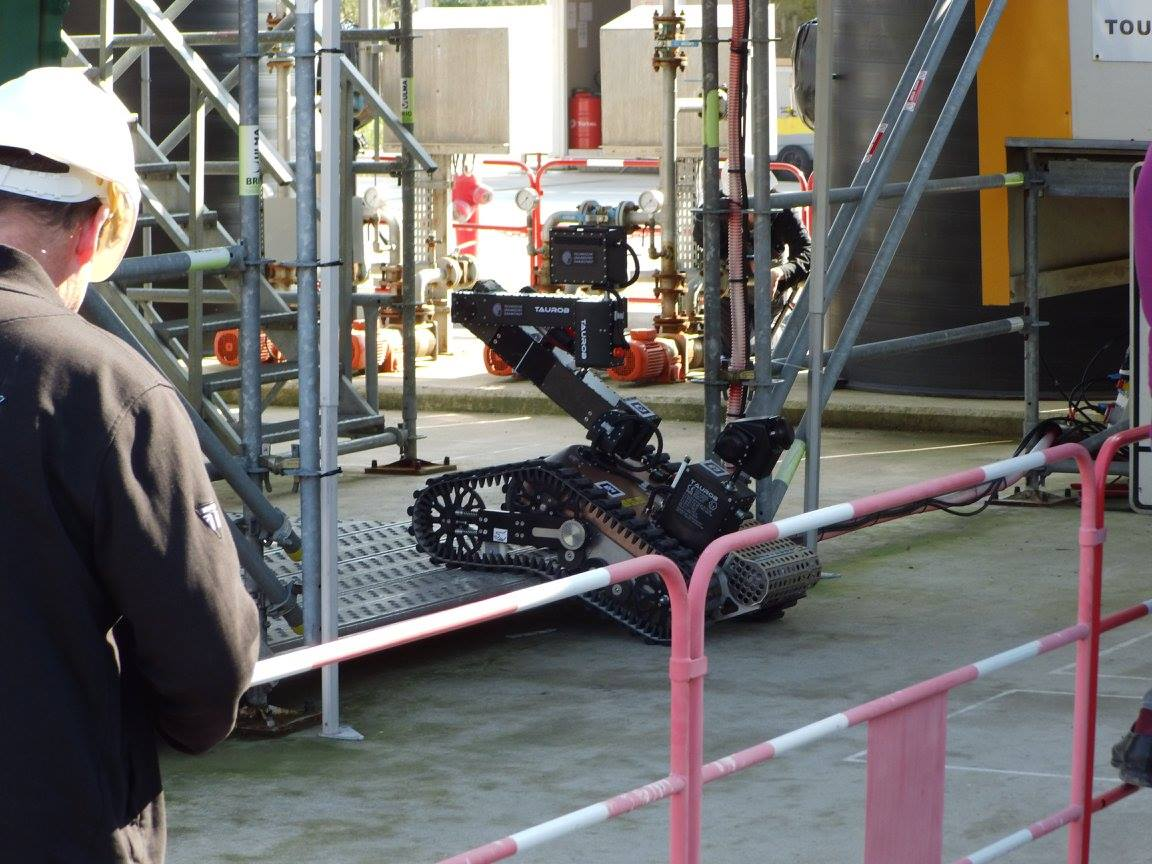
Robot Argonaut at the ARGOS Challenge

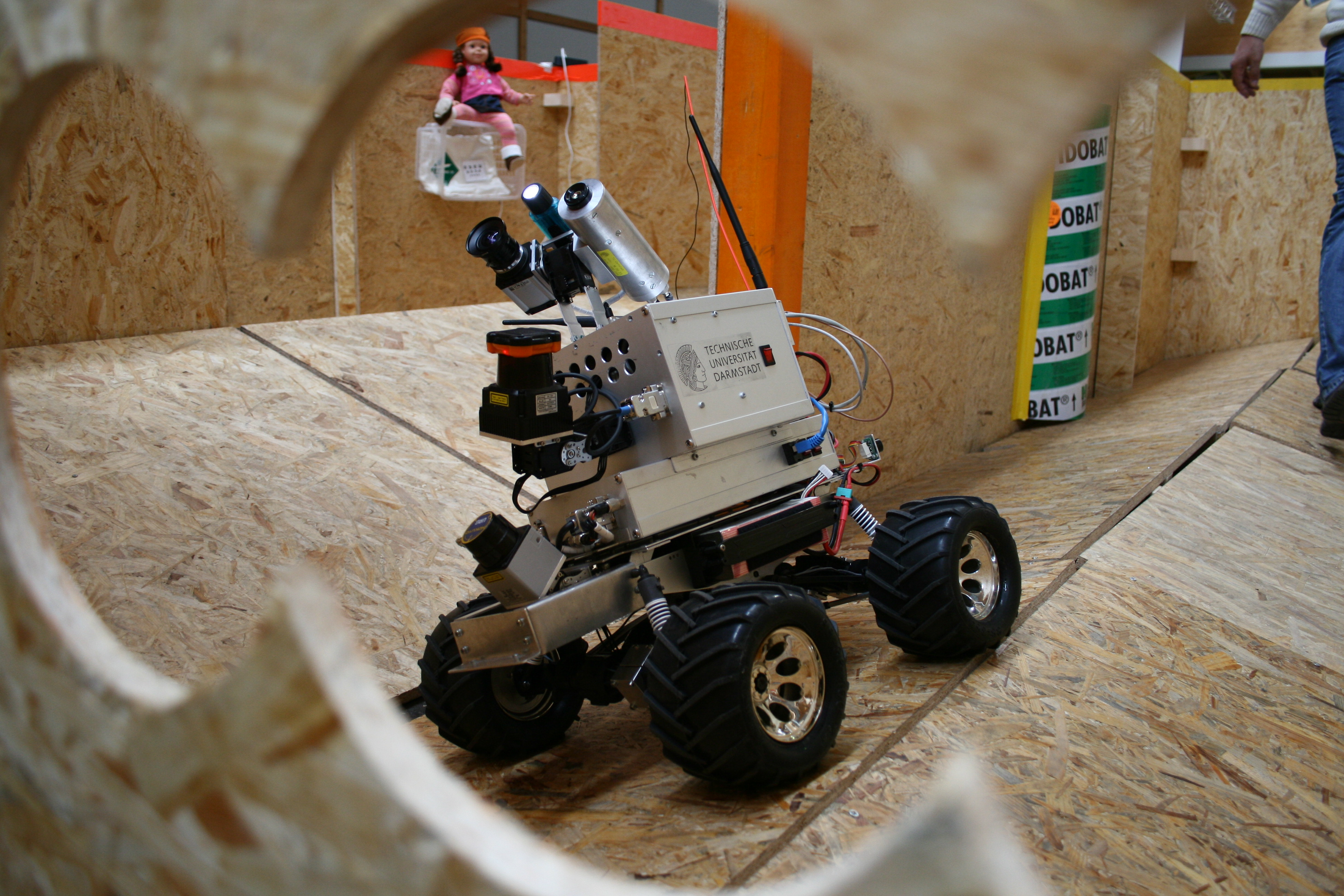
Hector UGV identifies a victim using a probabilistic world model, based on information from heterogeneous sensors.

== Campuses ==
The university, with 164 Buildings and an area of property of 600 acres (2.4 km^{2}), is concentrated at three campuses, Inner City, Lichtwiese and Botanical Garden. But individual facilities can be found in other parts of Darmstadt and in Griesheim, a neighboring town.

Technical University of Darmstadt Campuses
Technical University of Darmstadt Campuses
1 City Centre
2 Lichtwiese
3 Botanical Garden

=== Inner City Campus ===
Technical University of Darmstadt Campus City Centre
Technical University of Darmstadt Campus City Centre
1 Mensa (canteen)
2 Library
3 Audimax (largest lecture hall)
4 Altes Hauptgebäude (old main building)
5 Human Sciences
6 Mechanical Engineering
7 Center for Cybersecurity and Privacy Research
8 Mathematics
9 Physics
10 Computer Science
11 History and Social Sciences
12 Electrical Engineering and Information Technology

This campus lies very central in Darmstadt and is easily reachable by tram and bus from every part of the city. The departments located here are Electrical Engineering and Information Technology (FB18), History and Social Sciences (FB2), Human Sciences (FB3), Computer Science (FB20), Mathematics (FB4), Physics (FB5) and Law and Economics (FB1).

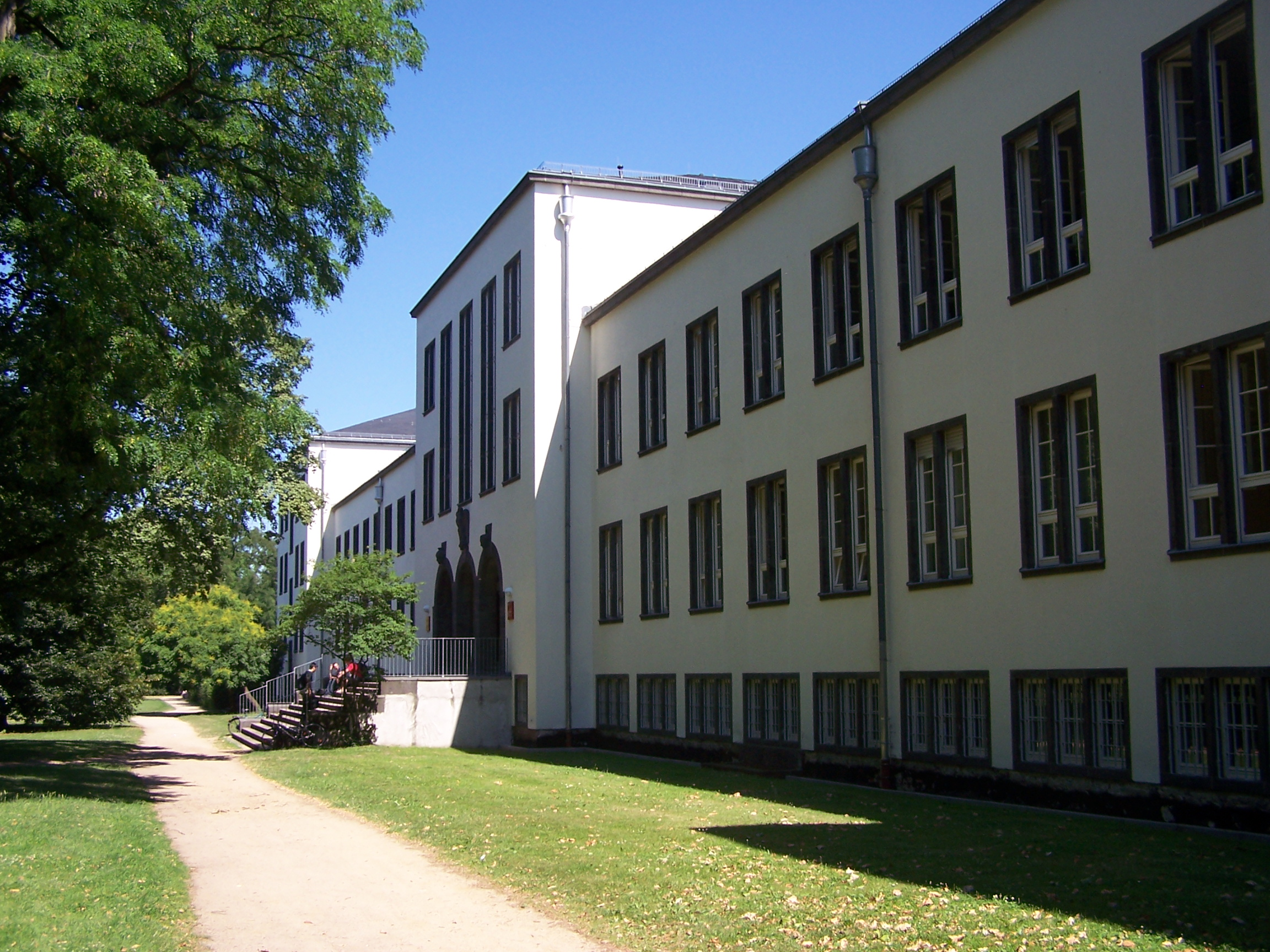
Robert Piloty Building, Department of Computer Science, 2006

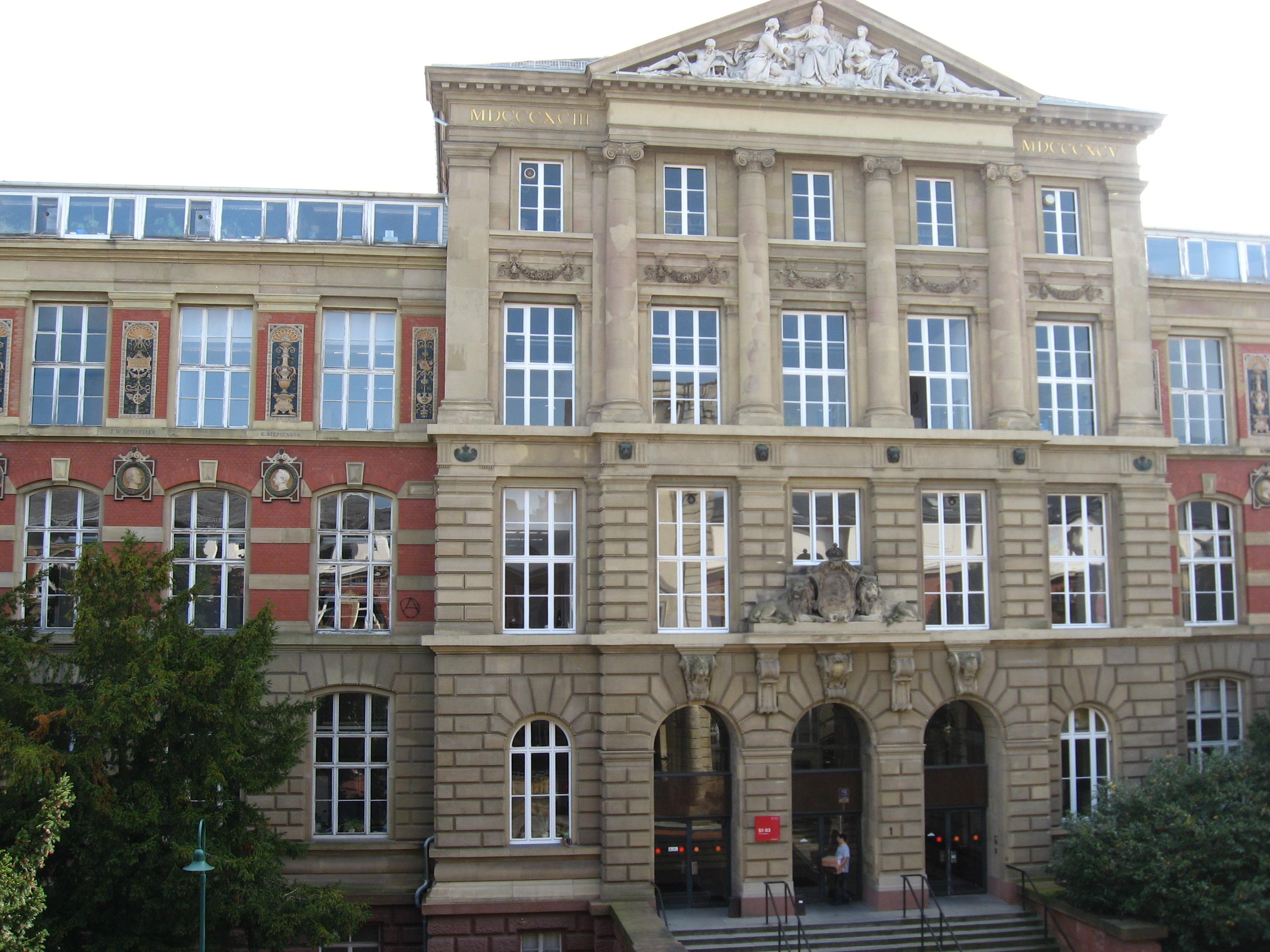
Altes Hauptgebäude of TU Darmstadt, 2008

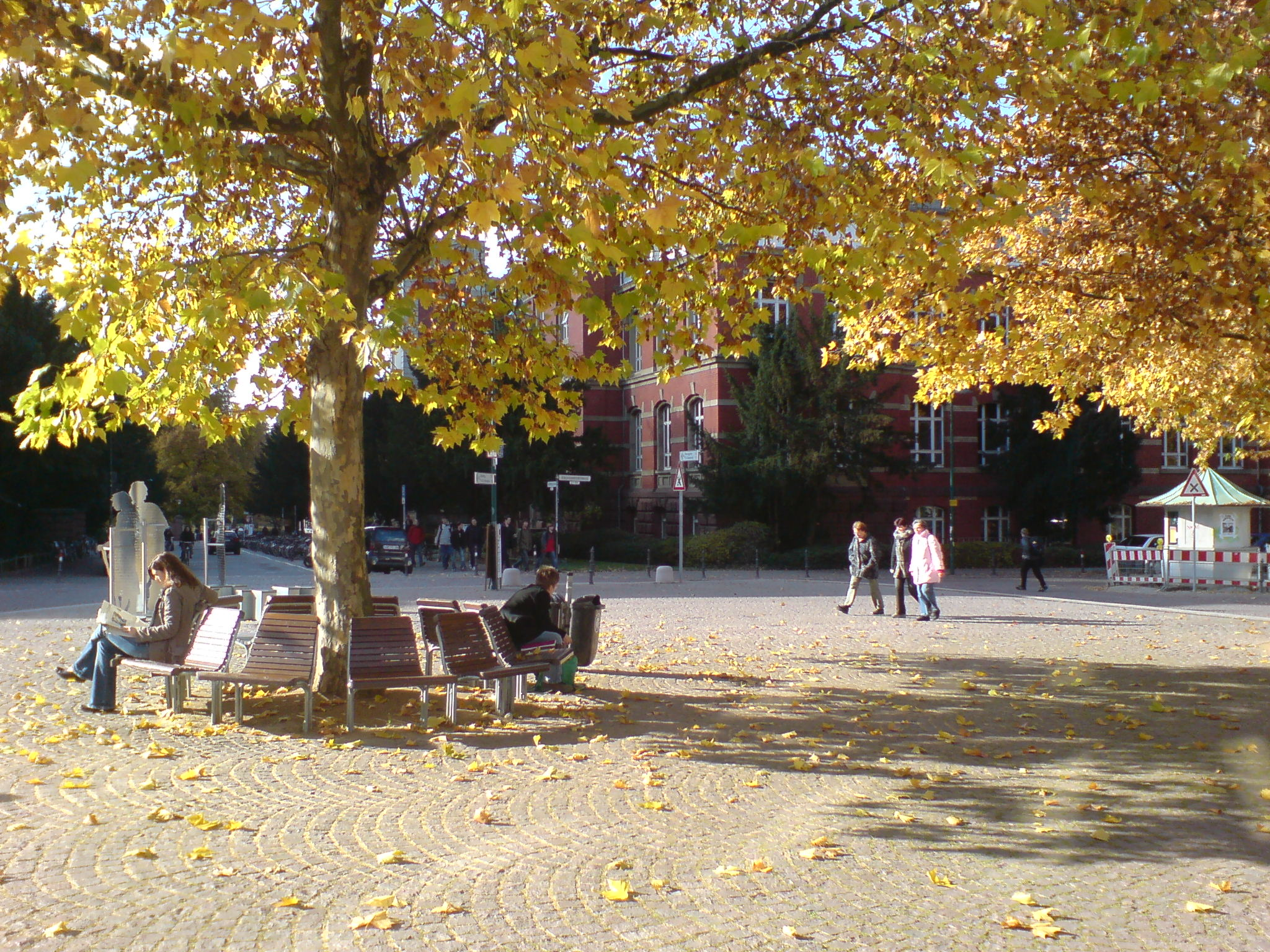
Kantplatz, Darmstadt, 2007

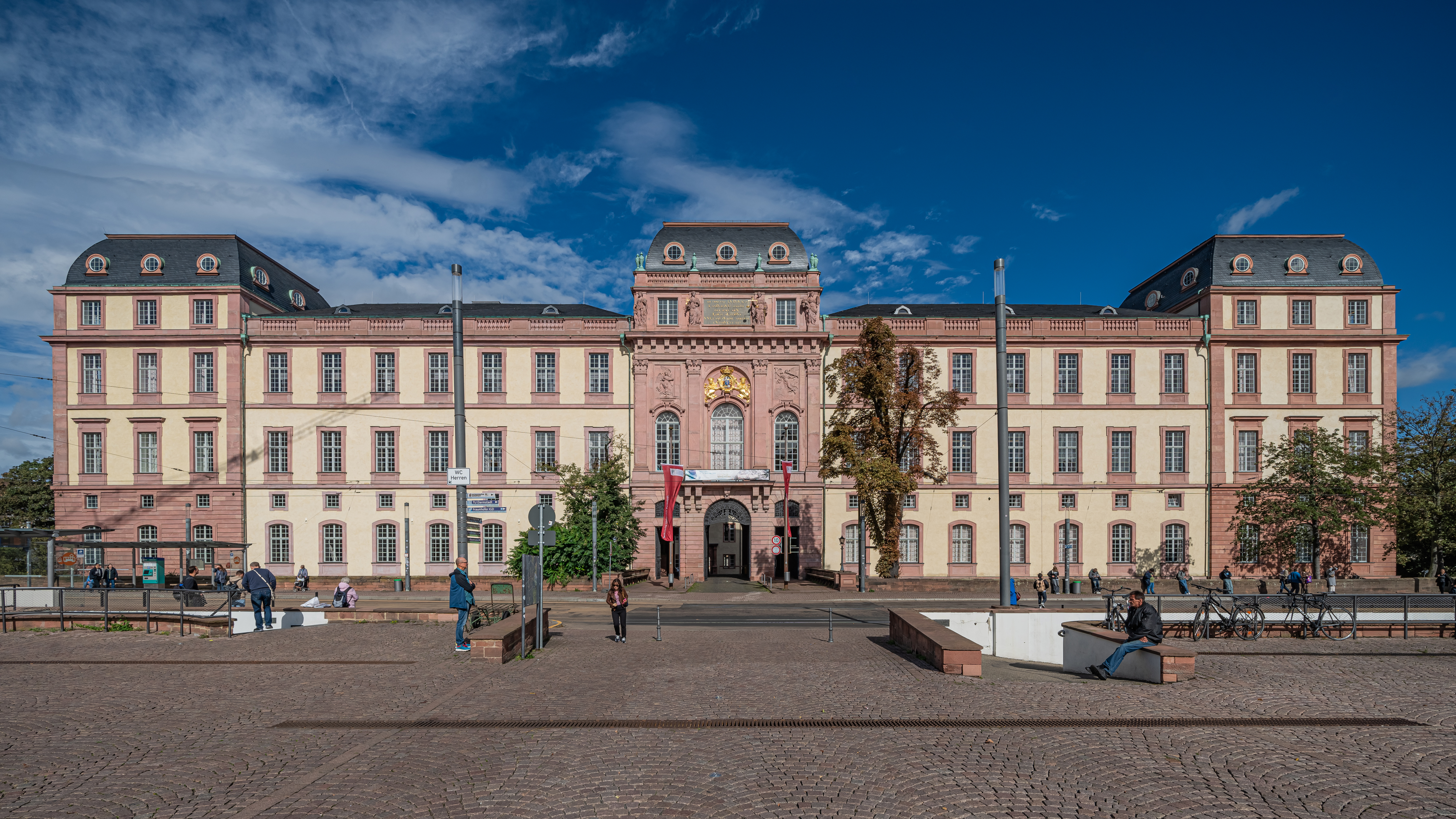
Darmstadt former Ducal Palace, now part of TU Darmstadt, with market square

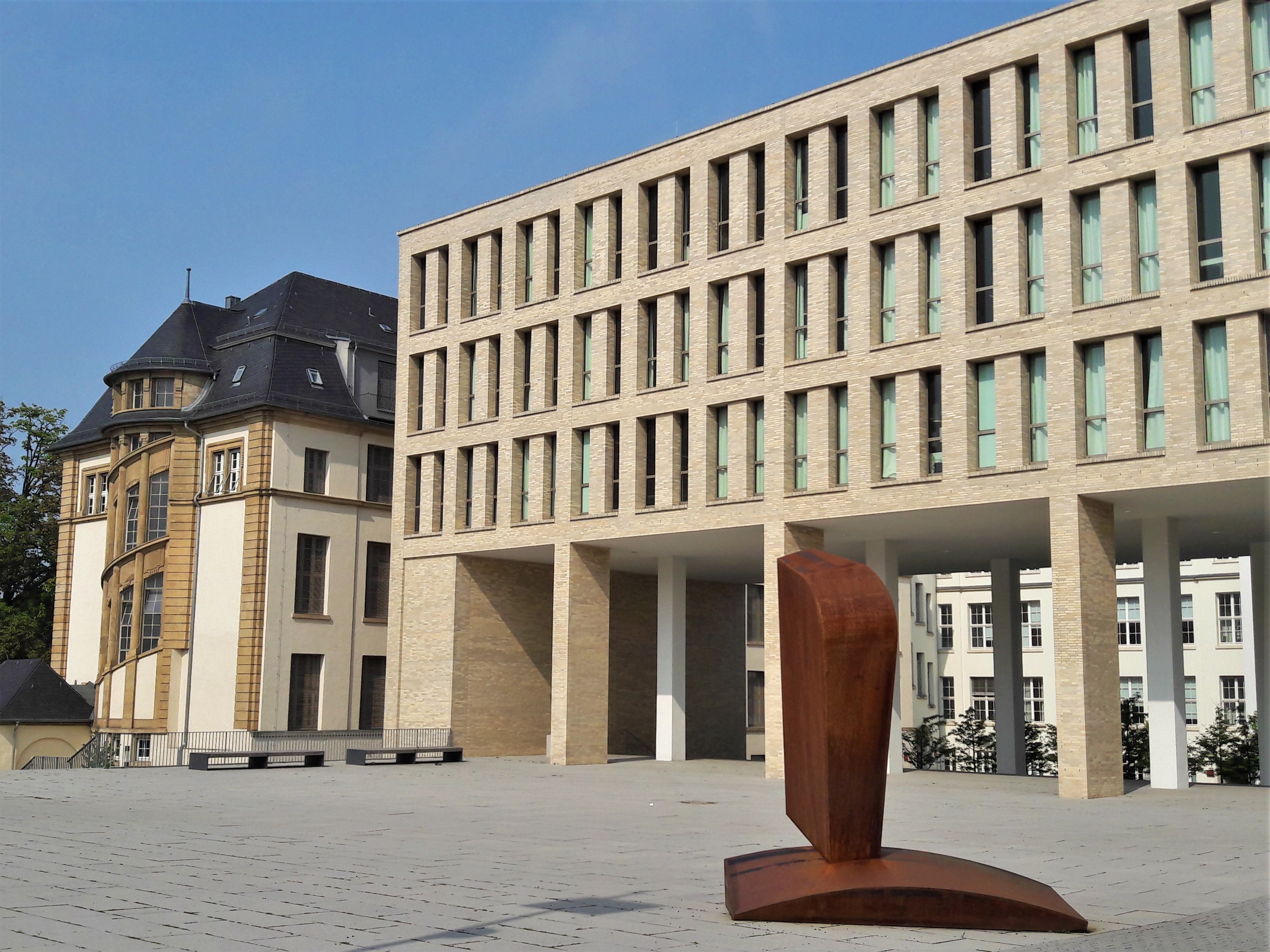
Campus Square, Inner City Campus of TU Darmstadt, with University Library and sculpture "Büste" by Franz Bernhard

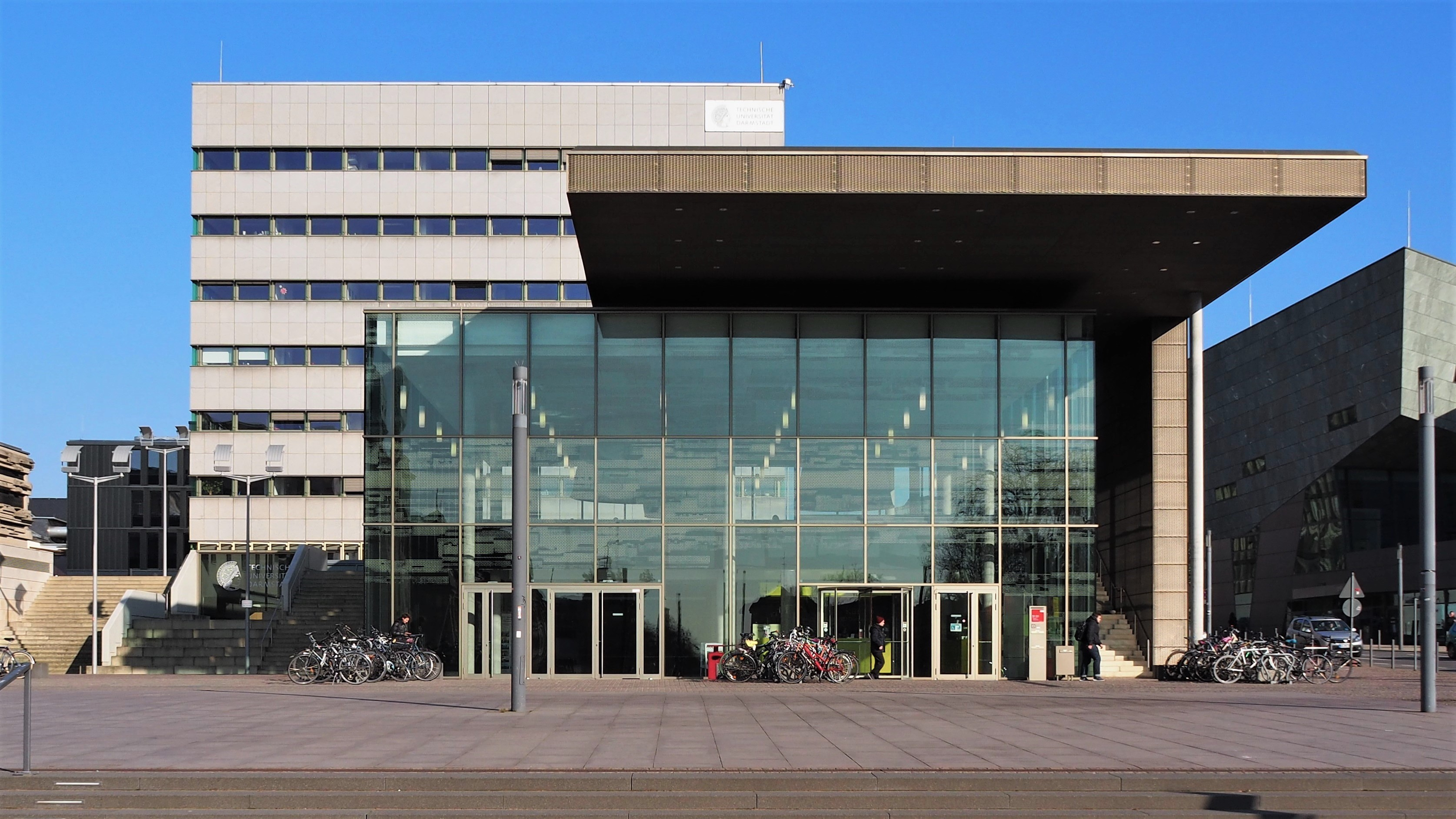
Main Entrance and Administrative Building, City Campus TU Darmstadt 2018

=== Campus Lichtwiese ===
Technical University of Darmstadt Campus Lichtwiese
Technical University of Darmstadt Campus Lichtwiese
1 Mensa (canteen)
2 Library
3 Mechanical Engineering
4 Civil and Environmental Engineering
5 Architecture
6 Center of Smart Interfaces
7 Inorganic Chemistry
8 Physical Chemistry
9 Organic Chemistry
10 Institute of Materials Science (Materials and Earth Sciences)

The Lichtwiese lies in the eastern part of Darmstadt. It is reachable by bus, tram and a nearby train station. The departments located here are Architecture (FB15), Civil Engineering and Geodesy (FB13), Chemistry (FB7), Mechanical Engineering (FB16) and Materials and Earth Sciences (FB11).

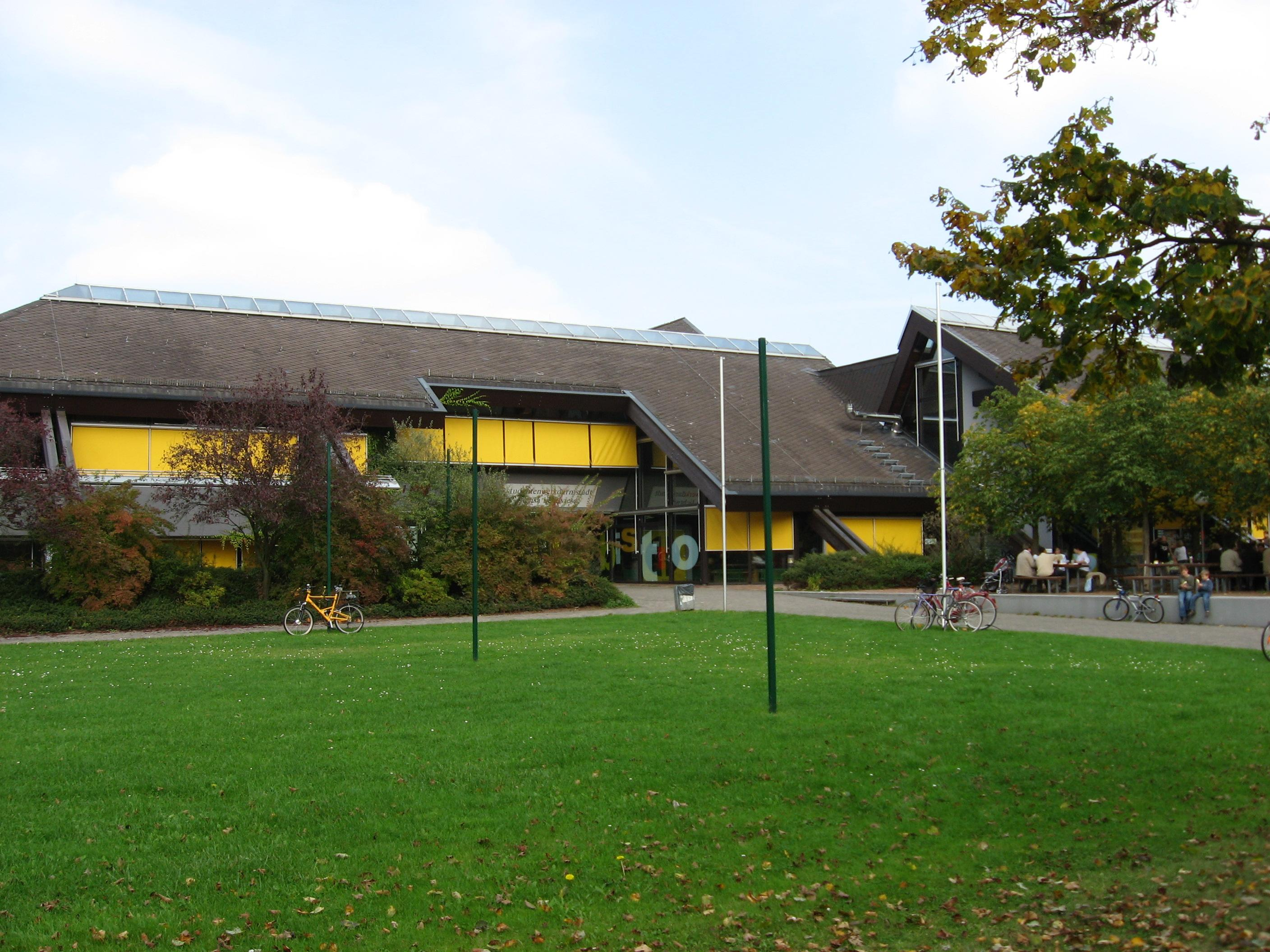
Canteen at Campus Lichtwiese, 2007

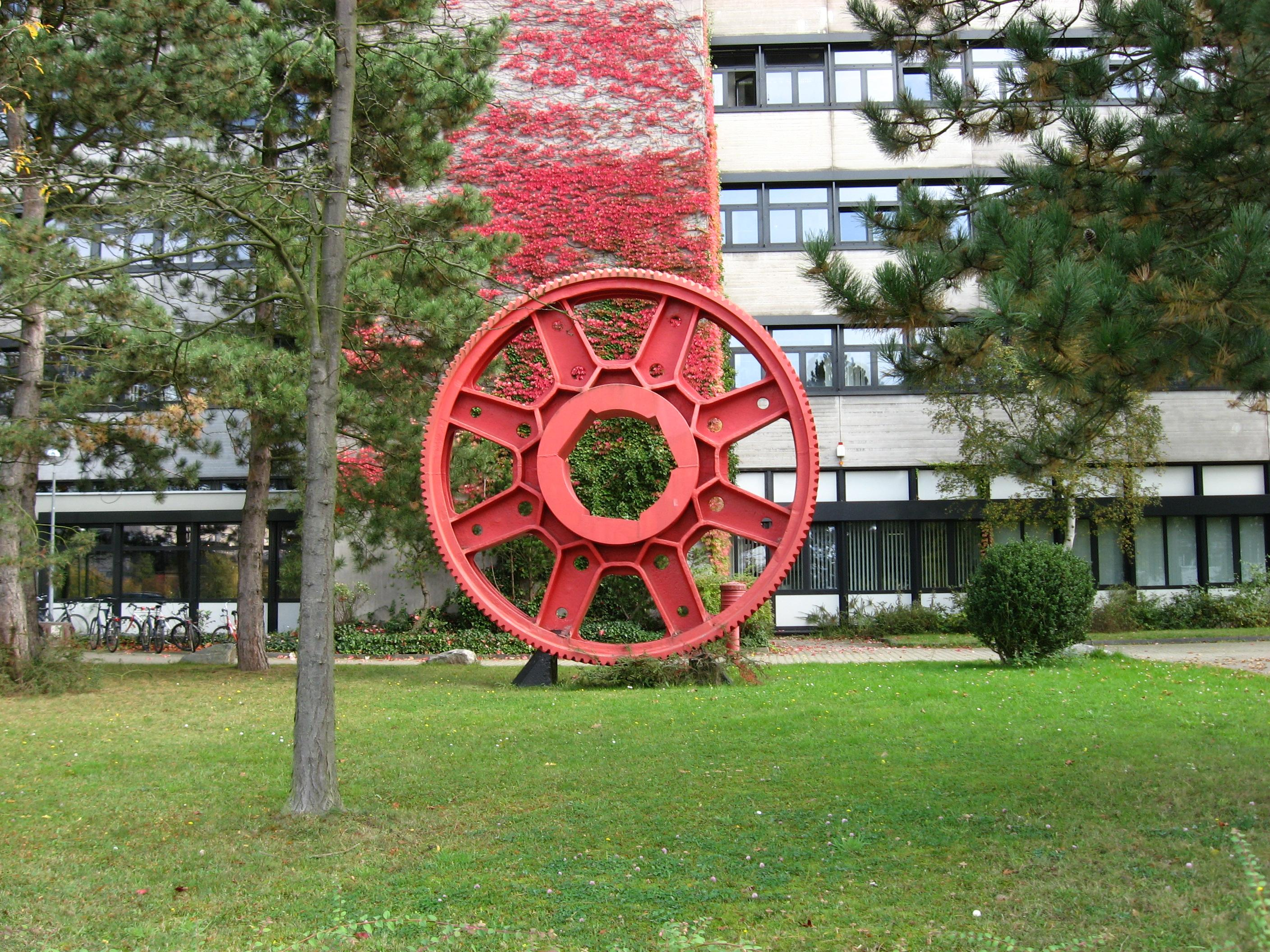
Giant gear in front of the mechanical engineering building, 2007

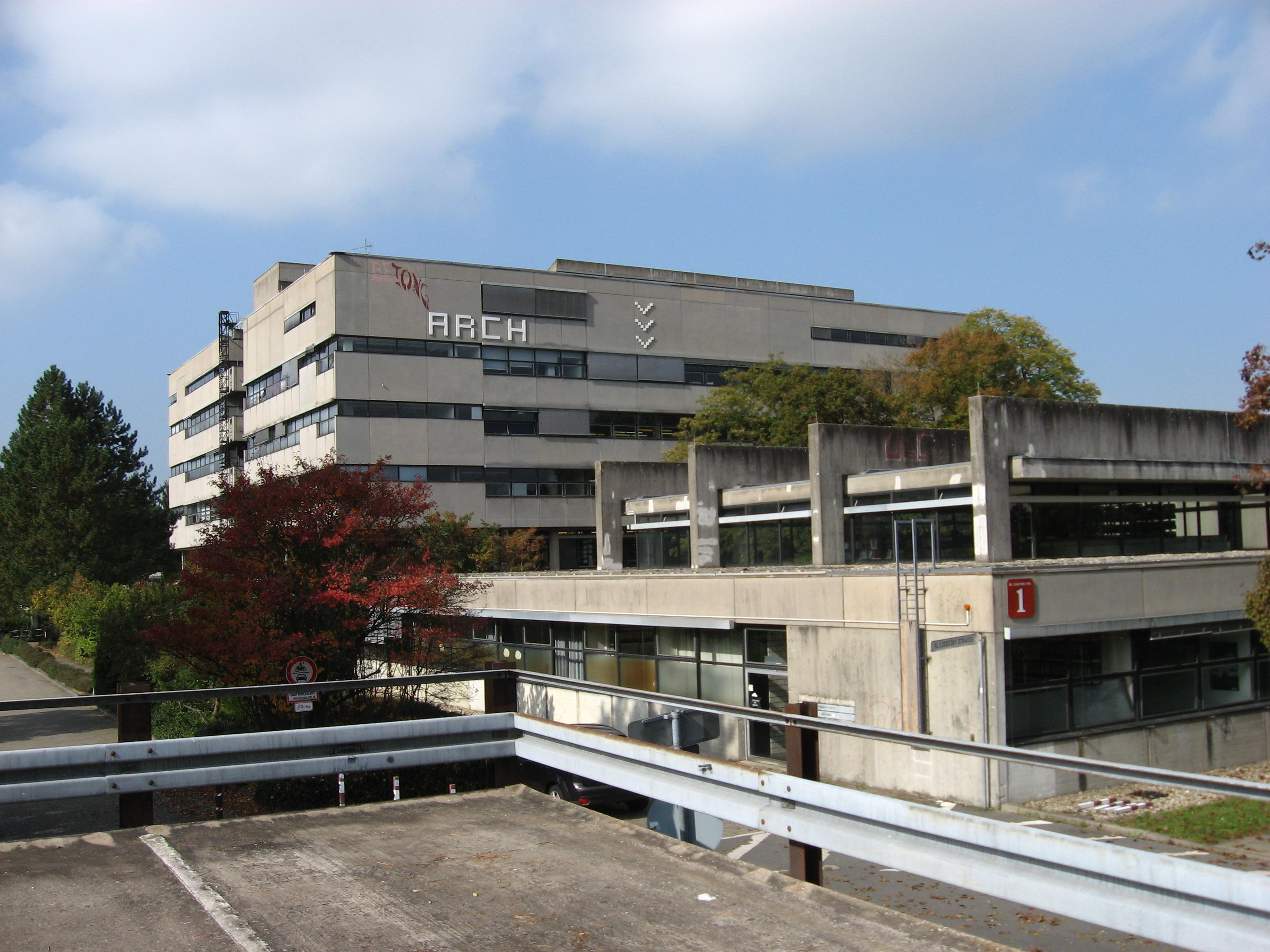
Department of Architecture, 2007

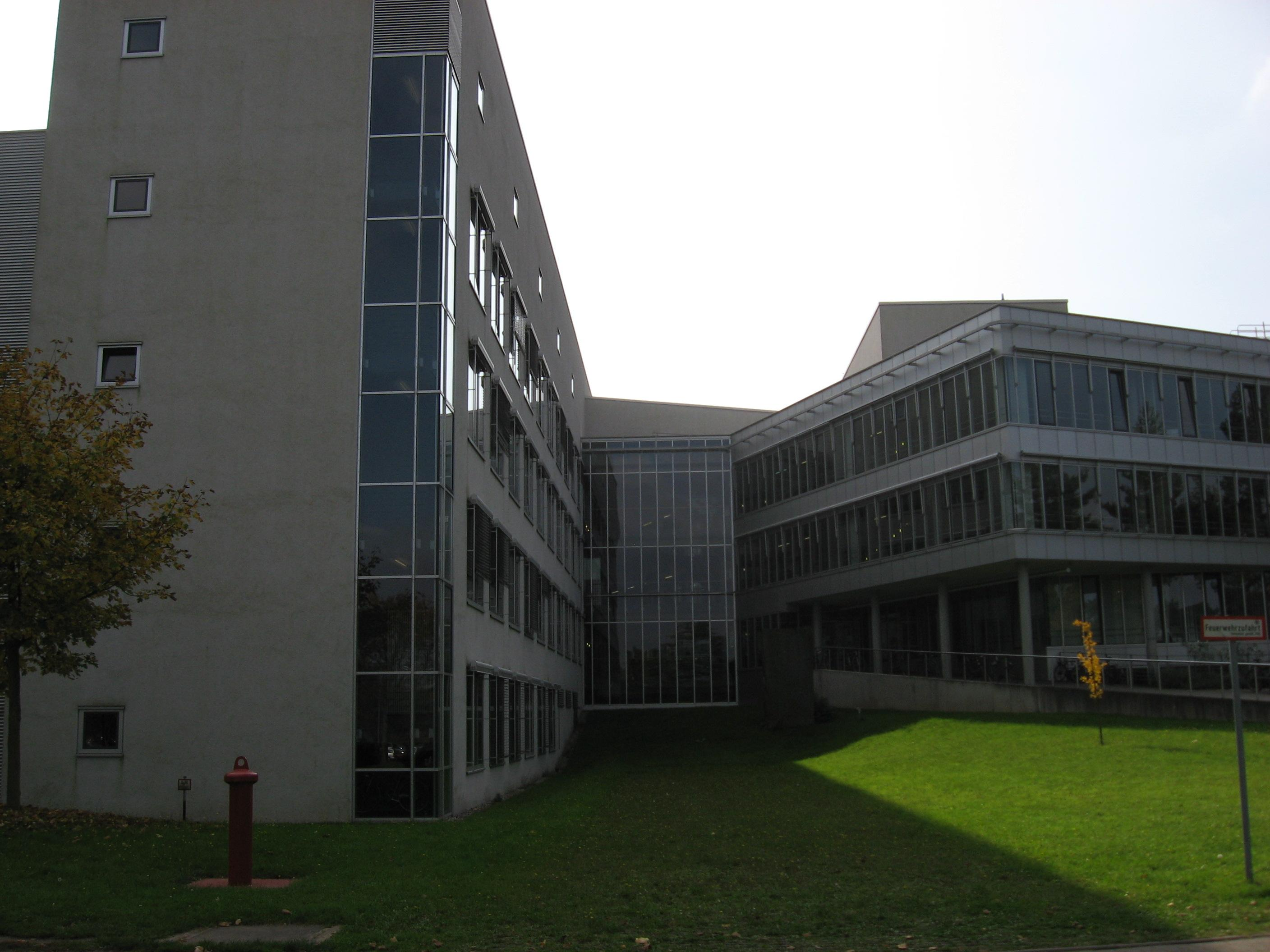
Institute of Materials Science, TU Darmstadt Lichtwiese Campus

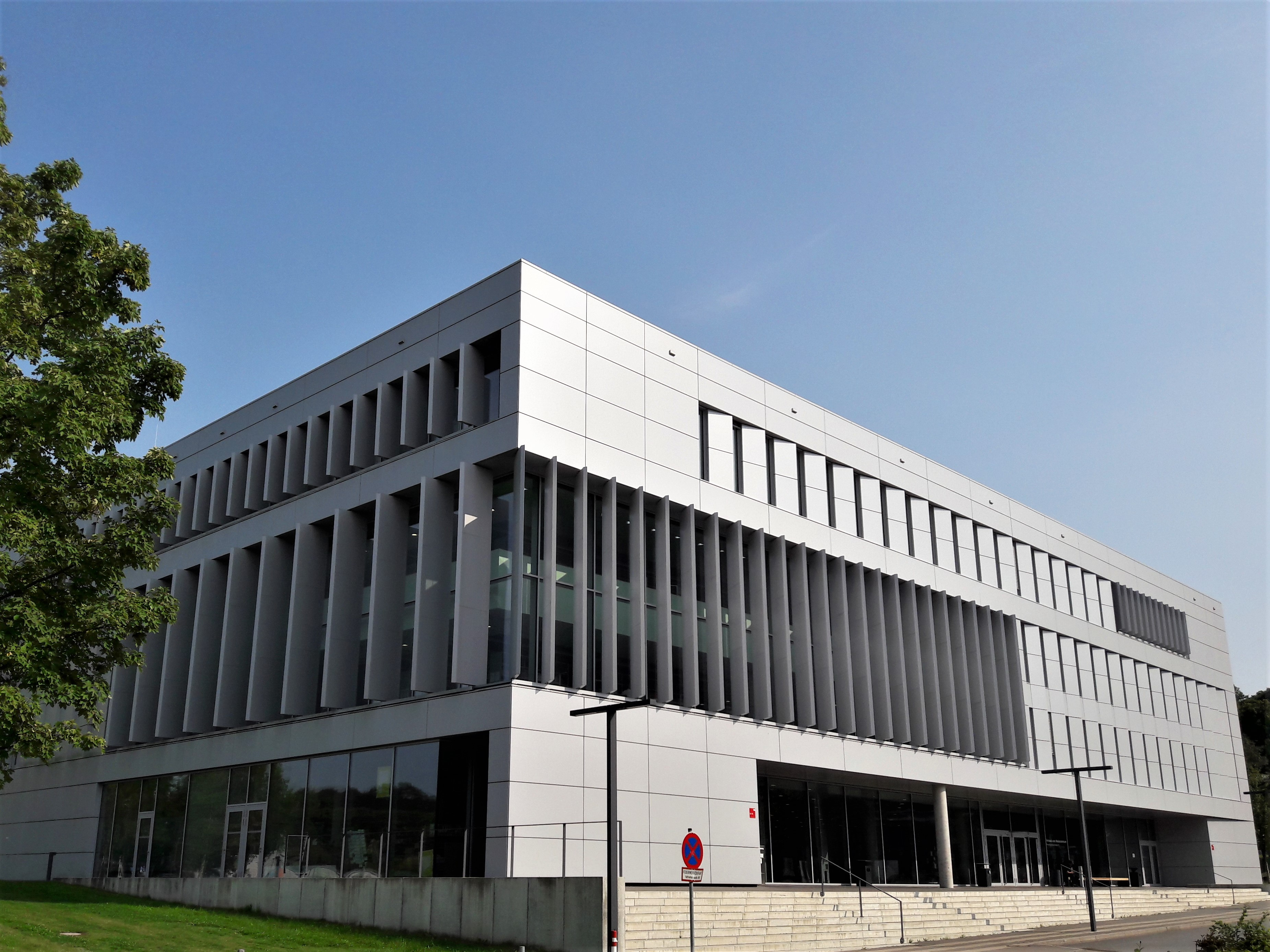
Lecture Halls and Library Building at Lichtwiese Campus

=== Botanical garden ===
Technical University of Darmstadt Campus Botanical Garden
Technical University of Darmstadt Campus Botanical Garden
1 Biology
2 Institute of Applied Geosciences (Materials and Earth Sciences)
3 Institute of Microbiology and Genetics
4 Greenhouse
5 Botanical Garden

The Botanical Garden of TU Darmstadt is located near the Lichtwiese Campus and the Department of Biology (FB10) is located here as well. With additional buildings of the Department of the Materials and Earth Sciences (FB11) and parts of the faculty of Chemical Engineering and Biotechnology of the Darmstadt University of Applied Sciences (h_da) it makes for an additional smaller campus.

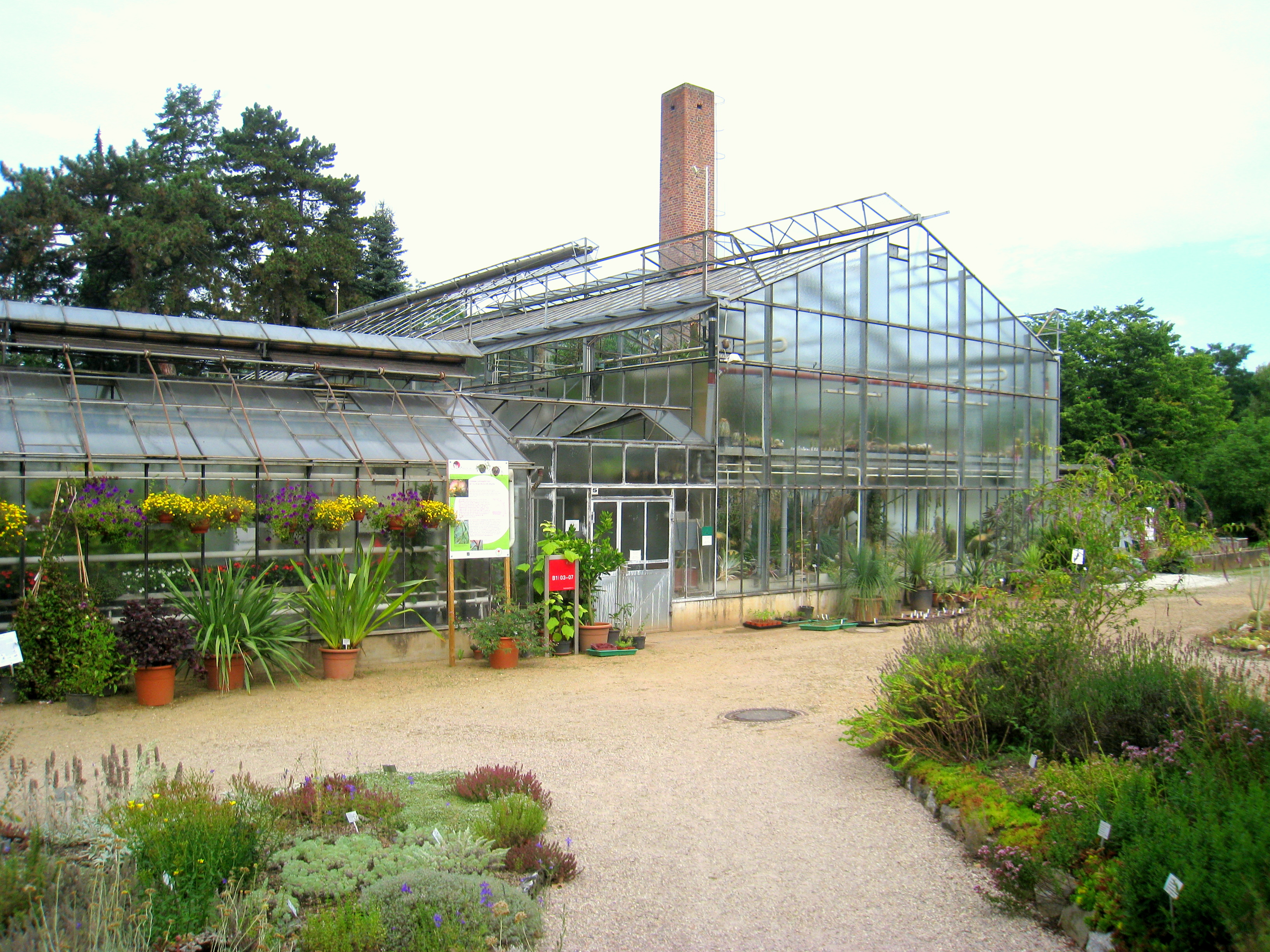
Greenhouse, 2009

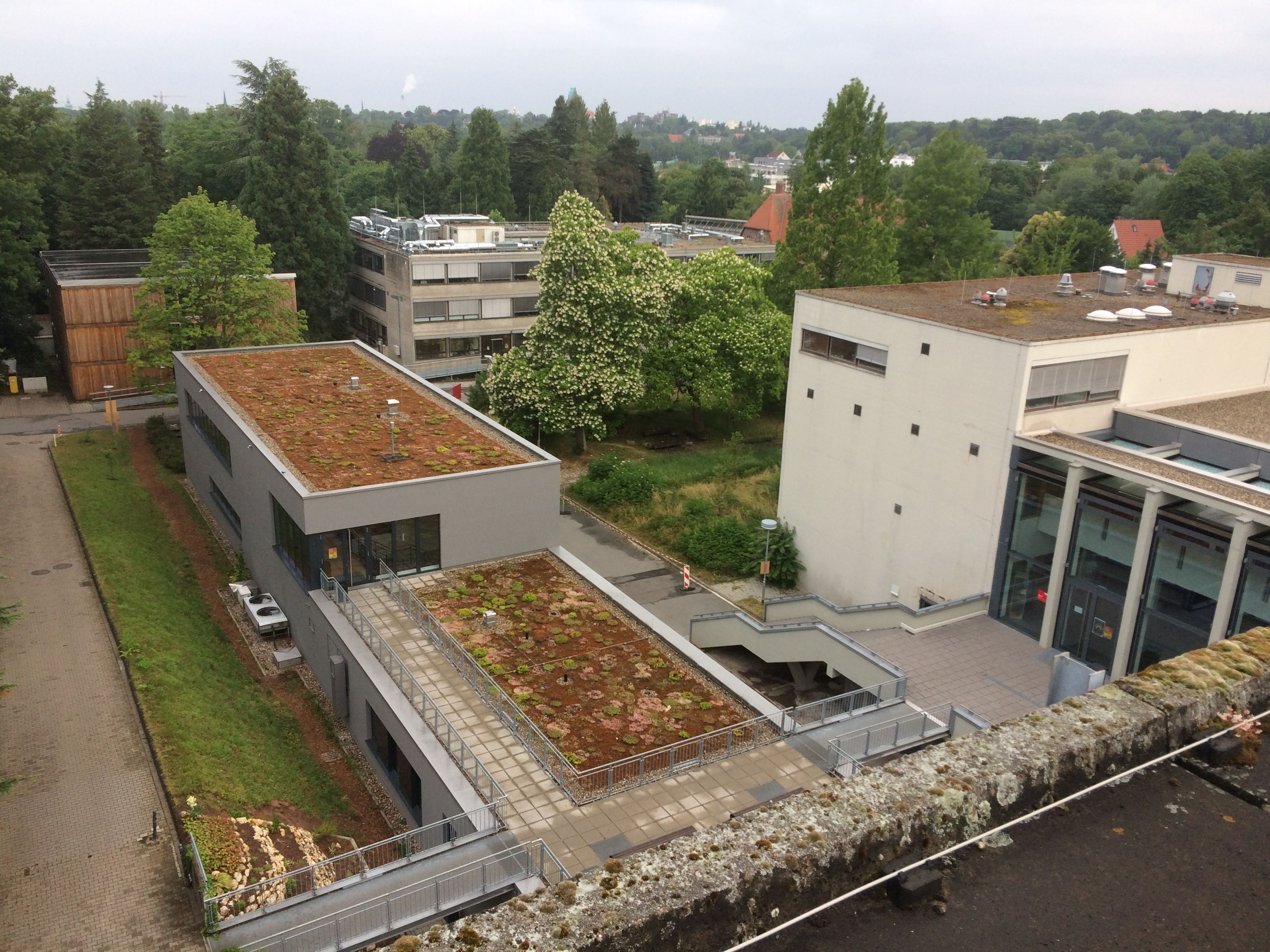
Botanical Garden Campus of TU Darmstadt

=== Griesheim ===
Since 2005, TU Darmstadt owns the August Euler Airfield, Germany's oldest airfield, for scientific purposes. It is named after its founder August Euler, a pioneer aviator. The airfield is not only used to start planes, but also to conduct research on topics where wide spaces are needed, for example driver assistance systems and automotive lighting are being tested here. Located near the airfield are the wind tunnels of TU Darmstadt.

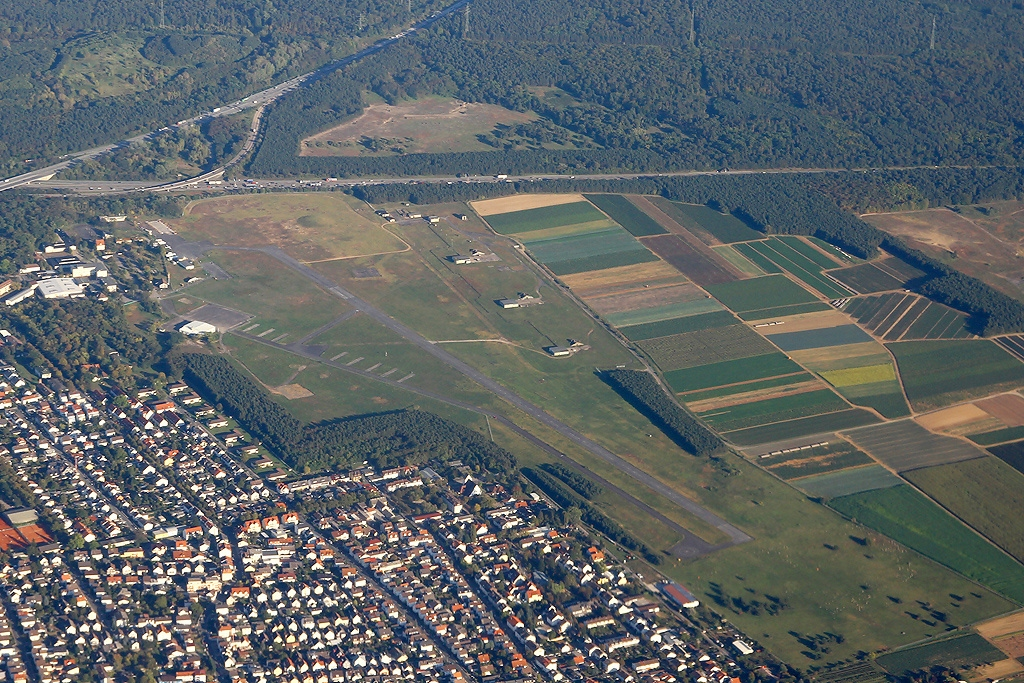
August Euler Airfield, 2011

== Internationality ==
With 18% (2017), the percentage of international students at TU Darmstadt is clearly higher than the average of German universities of 13% (2017/18). TU Darmstadt maintains partnership agreements with over 300 universities in 53 countries world-wide, which enable students to come to TU Darmstadt and to go abroad within their course of studies. For example, the Technische Universität Darmstadt has partnerships with the University of California, Berkeley, Katholieke Universiteit Leuven, Nanyang Technological University, Tsinghua University and Seoul National University. With Tongji University Shanghai, Virginia Polytechnic Institute and State University and Graz University of Technology, TU Darmstadt has developed strategic partnerships.

The Technische Universität Darmstadt has been awarded the title "European University" by the European Commission. Together with 6 other European technical universities, TU Darmstadt has formed the alliance UNITE! (University Network for Innovation, Technology and Engineering). The aim of the project is to create a trans-European campus, to introduce trans-European curricula, to promote scientific cooperation between the members and to strengthen knowledge transfer between the countries. The alliance includes Aalto University, the Royal Institute of Technology, the National Polytechnic Institute of Grenoble, the Polytechnic University of Turin, the Polytechnic University of Catalonia and the University of Lisbon.

The university offers international (English-language) Master's programs and a broad range of double degree programs. The Joint Master Programme "International Cooperation in Urban Development (Mundus Urbano)" is offered together with Université Pierre Mendès-France, International University of Catalonia, and Universita degli Studi di Roma Tor Vergata as part of the Erasmus Mundus programme of the European Commission.

TU Darmstadt is a member of the Conference of European Schools for Advanced Engineering Education and Research.

== Student life ==
=== Activities ===
TU Darmstadt offers various recreational sports courses and operates three sports halls, a sports stadium including various fields, a swimming pool, and a fitness studio. TU Darmstadt won the university competition of the German Olympic Sports Confederation for the third time in succession and has since been awarded the title of the most athletic university in Germany. There are manifold accredited student groups, ranging from the Formula SAE TU Darmstadt Racing Team (DART), TU Darmstadt Space Technology (TUDSaT), Akaflieg Darmstadt, and Chaos Computer Club to a theater group, an orchestra, and the campus radio AudioMax. The annual job fair konaktiva, which connects approximately 10,000 students with potential employers, is organized by volunteer students.

=== Students' representation ===
Students at TU Darmstadt are represented by the students' parliament (Studierendenparlament, StuPa), which is elected annually and in turn elects the General Students' Committee (Allgemeiner Studierendenausschuss, AStA). The AStA is the students' government and engages in university politics and provides social and economic counseling for students. Moreover, it runs the café 60,3qm ("60.3 square meters"), a beer garden and a club in the Ducal Palace, a store for office supplies, and a bicycle garage. In addition to the regular university curriculum, students can attend various non-credit courses held by students and coordinated by the AStA.

Complementing the General Students' Committee, which represents all students enrolled at TU Darmstadt, the students of each department (Fachschaft) are represented by an elected students' council (Fachschaftsrat). Students of the Fachschaft participate in a number of committees of their department, such as the department's council (Fachbereichsrat), which consists of professors, students, academic staff and administrative staff.

=== Legends ===
Since the 1970s, the fictitious student Fritz Filter passed numerous examinations at the Department of Architecture before graduating with a Diplom degree in 2004. His thesis featured the design of the department building. Fritz Filter turned in multiple further architecture theses since then.

=== Housing ===
According to a survey determined in 2016, students in Darmstadt paid an arithmetic mean of 348 euros a month for rent, heat and utilities. With the German average being 323 euros at the time, this made Darmstadt the ninth most expensive city for students in Germany. This value only includes students who live alone, are not married and are pursuing their first degree. In 2016, on national average, approximately 20% lived with their parents, 12% lived in a hall of residence, 1% were lodgers, 30% were sharing a flat with others, 17% were living alone and 21% were sharing a flat with their partner. There are about 2600 beds in 10 halls of residence offered by the state-run student affairs organization Studierendenwerk Darmstadt for students of TU Darmstadt and the Darmstadt University of Applied Sciences.

== Reputation and ranking ==
University rankings

Overall – Global & National
QS World 2026	250	15
THE World 2026	251–300	26–30
ARWU World 2026	501–600	36–41

In the QS World University Rankings of 2026, the university secured a global ranking of 250, making it the 15th top university nationally. According to the Times Higher Education World University Rankings for the year 2026, it was placed within the 251–300 range globally and ranked between 26th and 30th in the national context. Furthermore, in the 2026 ARWU World Rankings, it fell within the 501–600 category on a global scale, while its national position varied between 36th and 41st.

For several years, TU Darmstadt has been one of the universities with the most top managers in the German economy. The university ranks currently number one. In total nine board members of DAX listed companies have studied there.

On average, graduates receive the second-highest salary of all public universities in Germany in the first two years of their careers.

In the latest Humboldt-Ranking of the Alexander von Humboldt Foundation, TU Darmstadt takes first place in engineering.

According to the research report 2018 of the German Research Foundation (DFG), which breaks down the grants for the period 2014 to 2016, TU Darmstadt received the highest grants of any German university in the field of computer science and the fourth highest grants in engineering. In a competitive selection process, the DFG selects the best research projects from researchers at universities and research institutes and finances them.

According to CSRankings, a ranking that makes it possible to evaluate the scientific achievements of universities in individual areas of computer science, TU Darmstadt is the leading university in Europe in the fields of cryptography, IT security and software engineering. In the fields of artificial Intelligence, robotics, machine learning, computer vision and computational linguistics, the university ranks second among European universities and first among German universities. It is one of the top 10 universities in Europe in all scientific fields of computer science. CSRankings is one of three rankings that are recognized according to the criteria of the Computing Research Association (CRA). The CRA has defined four criteria: rankings should be based on "good" (clean and curated) data, the data should be transparent and available, and the methodology should be based on objective criteria. CSRankings aims to reflect the quality of research by relating the contributions of universities in selective conferences to the size of the university. This methodology should be less susceptible to manipulation than the measurement of citation. The methodology is transparent and accessible.

In the university ranking 2018 of the German business magazine Wirtschaftswoche, TU Darmstadt is considered to be the best university for business informatics. In industrial engineering the university secures the 3rd place. In mechanical engineering and electrical engineering TU Darmstadt ranks 4th.

In the Research Ranking of the Association for Information Systems, TU Darmstadt ranks 16th in business informatics worldwide, 3rd in Europe after the Copenhagen Business School and London School of Economics and Political Science and 1st in Germany.

According to the Stepstone salary report for graduates 2017, TU Darmstadt graduates earn the highest salary in engineering and information technology in Germany compared to graduates of other German universities.

In the QS Graduate Employability Rankings 2019, TU Darmstadt ranked 3rd in Germany, 22nd in Europe and 78th in the world.

According to Reuters, TU Darmstadt is among Europe's most innovative universities in 2019.

== Notable faculty and alumni ==
=== Nobel laureates ===
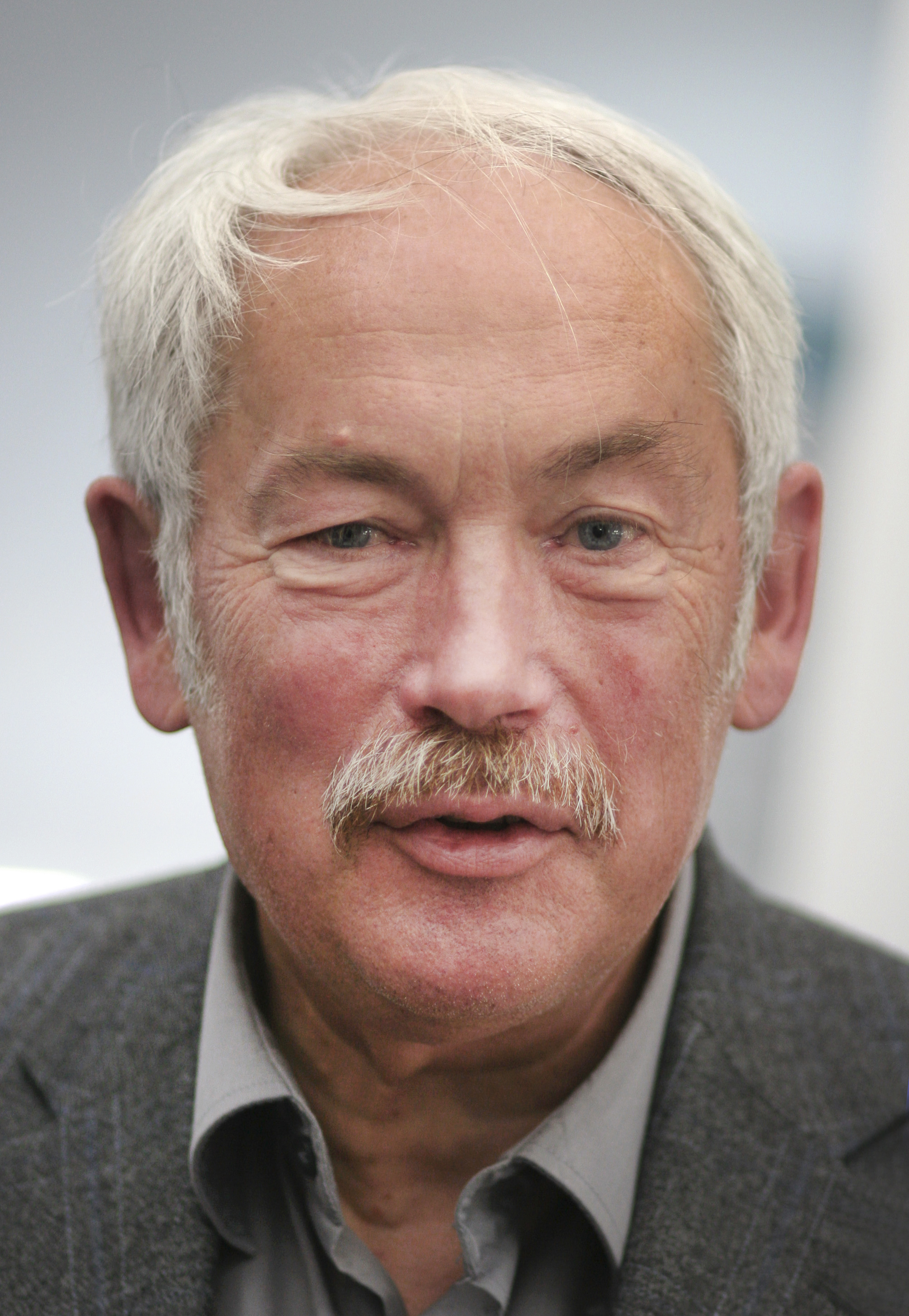
Peter Grünberg

Nobel laureates, who studied, taught and researched at the TH/TU Darmstadt:

- Peter Grünberg, physicist and Nobel laureate in Physics (2007)
- Horst Ludwig Störmer, physicist and Nobel laureate in Physics (1988), short time
- Gerhard Herzberg, chemist, physicist and Nobel laureate in Chemistry (1971)
- Hermann Staudinger, chemist and Nobel laureate in Chemistry (1953), short time

Taught at TH/TU Darmstadt through Emanuel Merck Lectureship:

- Susumu Kitagawa, chemist and Nobel laureate in Chemistry (2025)
- Carolyn Bertozzi, chemist and Nobel laureate in Chemistry (2022)
- Jennifer Doudna, biochemist and Nobel laureate in Chemistry (2020)
- Frances H. Arnold, chemist and Nobel laureate in Chemistry (2018)
- Harold Kroto, chemist and Nobel laureate in Chemistry (1996)
- Jean-Marie Lehn, chemist and Nobel laureate in Chemistry (1987)
- Manfred Eigen, chemist and Nobel laureate in Chemistry (1967)

Other Nobel laureates are associated with the university:

- Gerhard Ertl, chemist and Nobel laureate in Chemistry (2007), Hochschulrat (university council)
- K. Alex Müller, physicist and Nobel laureate in Physics (1987), Honorary doctorate
- Karl Ziegler, chemist and Nobel laureate in Chemistry (1963), Honorary doctorate
- Otto Hahn, chemist and Nobel laureate in Chemistry (1944), Honorary doctorate
- Carl Bosch, chemist, engineer and Nobel laureate in Chemistry (1931), Honorary doctorate
- Richard Willstätter, chemist and Nobel laureate in Chemistry (1915), Honorary doctorate

=== Business ===
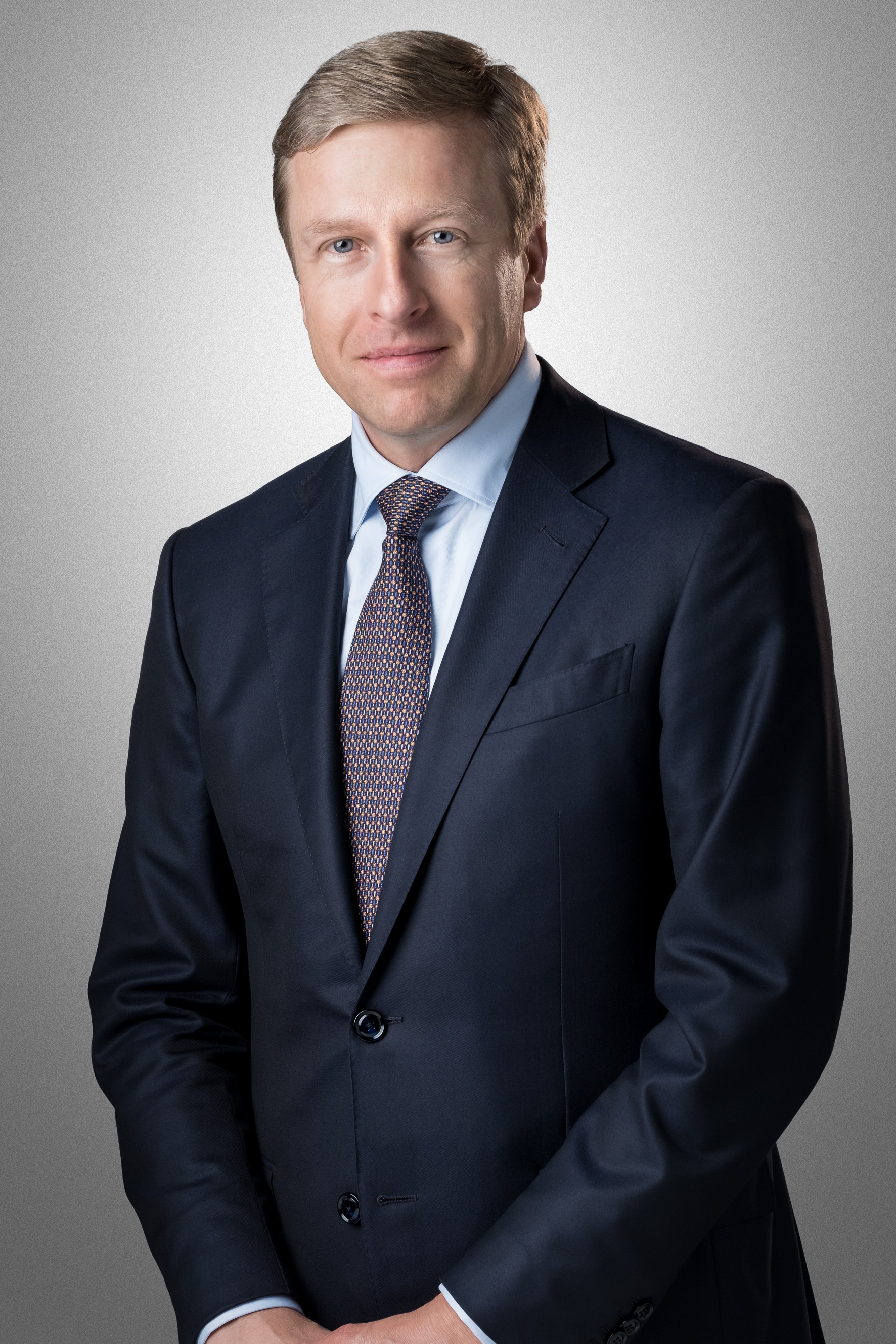
Oliver Zipse, Chairman of the Board of Management of BMW AG

- John Tu, founder of Kingston Technology and billionaire
- Vikram Lal, founder of Eicher Motors and billionaire
- Peter Schnell, founder of Software AG
- Enis Ersü, founder of ISRA VISION AG
- Péter Horváth, founder of Horváth & Partners
- Detlev Riesner, founder of QIAGEN
- Hans Dieter Pötsch, chairman of the board of management and chairman of the supervisory board of Porsche SE
- Oliver Zipse, chairman of the board of management of BMW AG
- Christoph Franz, chairman of Hoffmann-La Roche AG
- Carsten Kratz, managing director and senior partner of the Boston Consulting Group
- Marcus Kuhnert, member of the executive board and chief financial officer of Merck
- Kai Beckmann, CEO and chairman of the executive board of Merck
- Tobias Meyer, member of the board of management of Deutsche Post AG
- Nicolai Setzer, member of the executive board of Continental AG
- Werner Steinmüller, member of the executive board of Deutsche Bank
- Wolfgang Bernhard, former member of the board of management of Daimler AG
- Hans Demant, former chairman of Adam Opel GmbH
- Karl-Friedrich Rausch, member of the executive board of Deutsche Bahn AG
- Bert Rürup, former chairman of the German Council of Economic Experts
- Udo Steffens, former president and CEO Frankfurt School of Finance & Management
- Klaus-Dieter Vöhringer, former CEO of DaimlerChrysler AG
- Andreas Georgi, former member of the Board of Management of Dresdner Bank AG
- Walter Siepmann, industrialist and majority owner of Siepmann

=== Historical personalities ===
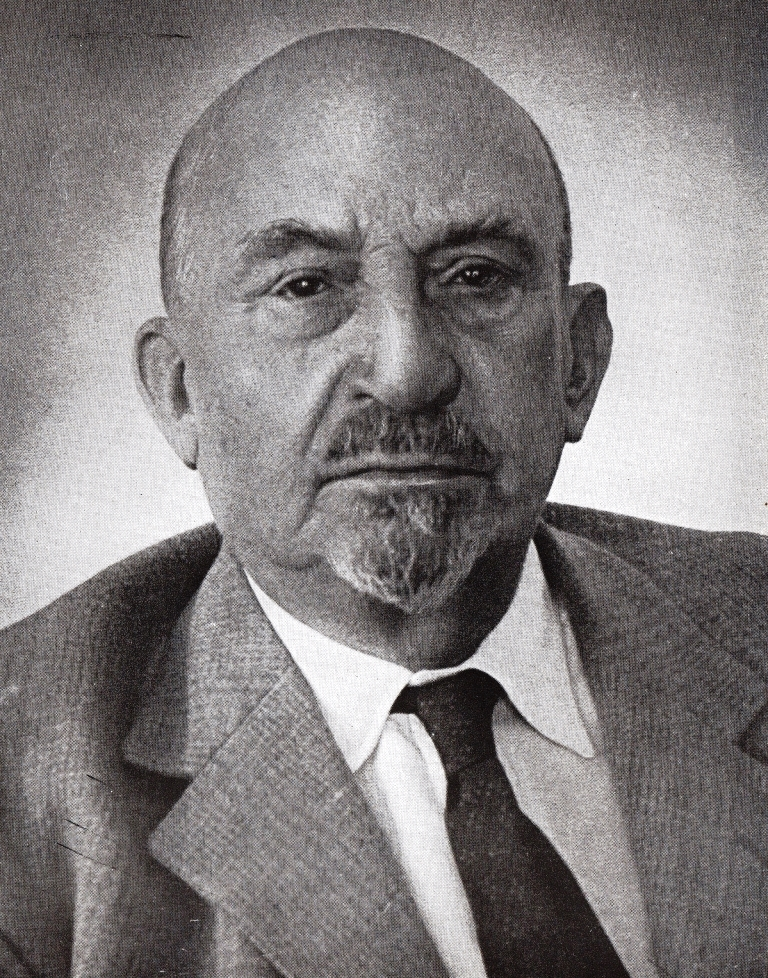
Chaim Weizmann

- Chaim Weizmann, first president of Israel
- Karl Plagge, recognized as one of the Righteous Among the Nations
- Jovanka Bončić-Katerinić, first woman to obtain an engineering degree in Germany
- Günter Behnisch, architect of the Olympiastadion (Munich)
- Edmund Collein, east German architect and town planner
- Wolfgang Rösch, vicar general of the Diocese of Limburg
- Franz-Josef Kemper, Olympic medalist
- Gerhard Hennige, Olympic medalist
- Josef Ganz, Jewish automotive engineer and father of the original "Volkswagen"

=== Science ===
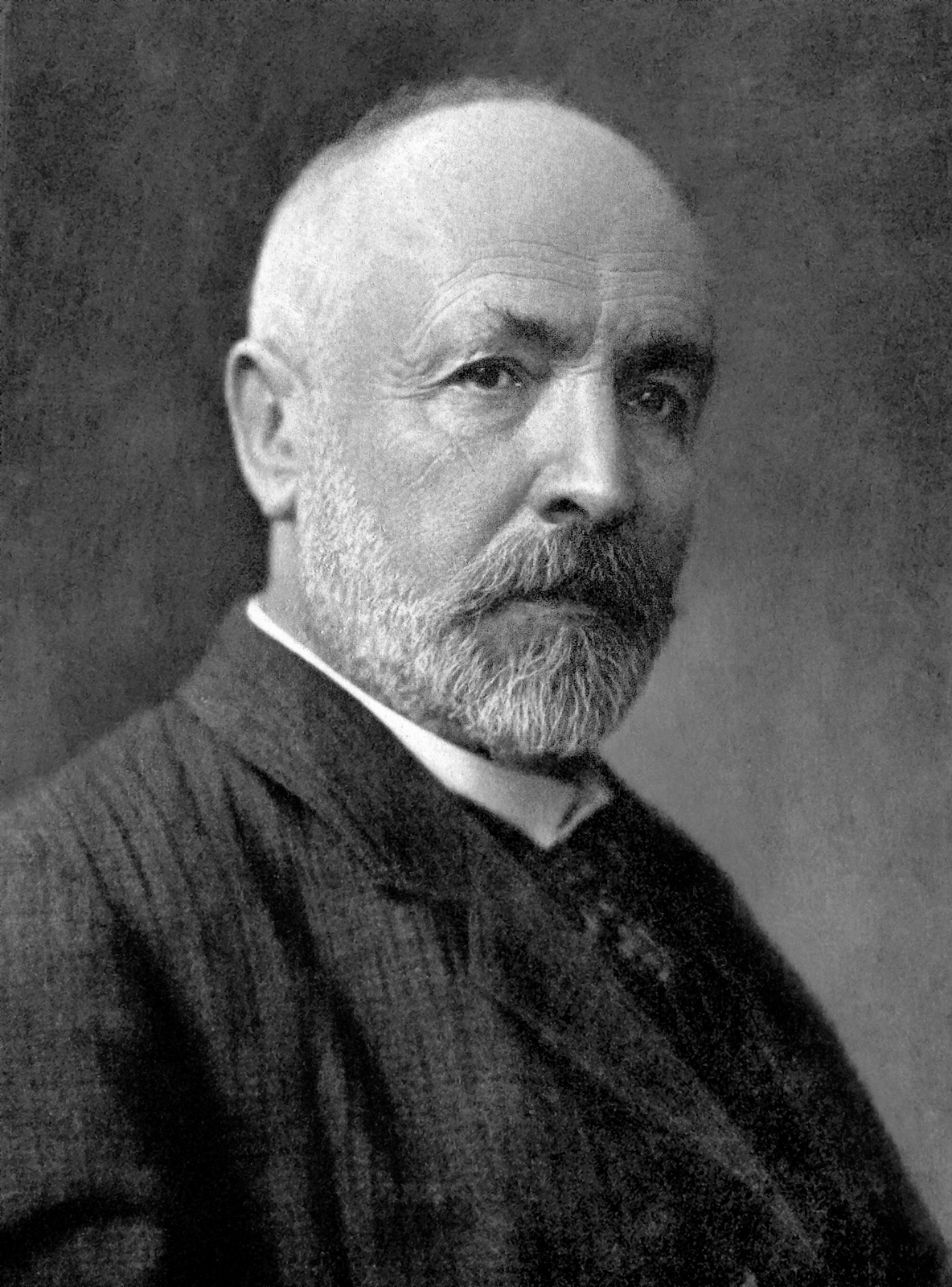
Georg Cantor

- Ralf Riedel, material scientist
- Marcus Rohrbach, computer scientist and Alexander von Humboldt Professor of the Alexander von Humboldt Foundation (2024)
- Angela Yu, cognitive scientist and Alexander von Humboldt Professorship of the Alexander-von-Humboldt-Stiftung (2021)
- Ulrike Kramm, chemist and winner of the Heinz Maier-Leibnitz-Preis (2020)
- Franziska Lang, classical archaeologist and Vice President for Academic Careers (2023)
- Marc Alexa, computer scientist and winner of the Heinz Maier-Leibnitz-Preis (2003)
- Harald Rose, physicist and laureate of the Wolf Prize in Physics (2011)
- Maximilian Haider, physicist and laureate of the Wolf Prize in Physics (2011)
- Peter Grünberg, physicist and laureate of the Wolf Prize in Physics (2007)
- Georg Cantor, creator of set theory
- Ernst Schröder, mathematician and known for his monumental lectures on the algebra of logic
- Lothar Collatz, mathematician and known for the still unsolved 3x + 1 problem
- William Prager, mathematician and known for Drucker–Prager yield criterion
- Karl Hessenberg, known for the Hessenberg matrix
- Erwin Kreyszig, applied mathematician and distinguished author, having written the textbook Advanced Engineering Mathematics, the leading and most famous textbook for civil, mechanical, electrical, and chemical engineering undergraduate engineering mathematics.
- Carl Adam Petri, mathematician and inventor of the Petri nets
- Sigurd Hofmann, physicist and discoverer of the chemical elements darmstadtium (Ds, atomic number 110), roentgenium (Rg, 111) and copernicium (Cn, 112)
- Peter Armbruster, physicist and discoverer of the elements 107 (bohrium), 108 (hassium), 109 (meitnerium), 110 (darmstadtium), 111 (roentgenium) and 112 (copernicium)
- Hans Busch, pioneer of electron optics and laid the theoretical basis for the electron microscope.
- Paolo Giubellino, Scientific Managing Director of the Facility for Antiproton and Ion Research and the GSI Helmholtz Centre for Heavy Ion Research
- Wolfgang Bibel, one of the founders of the research area of artificial intelligence in Germany and Europe
- Ottmar Edenhofer, lead author of the reports published by the Intergovernmental Panel on Climate Change which was awarded the Nobel Peace Prize (2007)
- Mohan Munasinghe, vice-chairman of the Intergovernmental Panel on Climate Change which was awarded the Nobel Peace Prize (2007)
- Andreas Dreizler, mechanical engineer and Leibniz Prize laureate (2014)
- Rainer Waser, electrical engineer and Leibniz Prize laureate (2014)
- Lutz Raphael, historian and Leibniz Prize laureate (2013)
- Jürgen Eckert, engineer and Leibniz Prize laureate (2009)
- Jürgen Rödel, material scientist and Leibniz Prize laureate (2009)
- Johannes Buchmann, computer scientist, mathematician and Leibniz Prize laureate (1993)
- Randolf Menzel, zoologist and Leibniz Prize laureate (1991)
- Thomas Weiland, physicist and Leibniz Prize laureate (1988)
- Wolfram Saenger, biochemist and Leibniz Prize laureate (1988)
- Bernd Giese, chemist and Leibniz Prize laureate (1987)
- Frank Steglich, physicist and Leibniz Prize laureate (1986)
- Eric Bodden, Heinz Maier-Leibnitz-Preis laureate (2014)
- Stefan Roth, Heinz Maier-Leibnitz-Preis laureate (2012)
- Christina Thiele, Heinz Maier-Leibnitz-Preis laureate (2010)
- Torsten Granzow, Heinz Maier-Leibnitz-Preis laureate (2008)
- Nicole Deitelhoff, Heinz Maier-Leibnitz-Preis laureate (2008)
- Carsten Bolm, Heinz Maier-Leibnitz-Preis laureate (1991)
- Alexandre Obertelli, Alexander von Humboldt Professorship of the Alexander-von-Humboldt-Stiftung (2019)
- Johann Dietrich Wörner, Director General of the European Space Agency
- Kurt H. Debus, rocket scientist and first Kennedy Space Center director
- Robert Piloty, pioneer of computer engineering and one of the founding fathers of computer science courses in Germany
- Peter Mertens, one of the founding fathers of business informatics courses in Germany
- Marc Baldus, physicist and professor of structural biology at Utrecht University
- Hanns-Peter Boehm, chemist and a pioneer of graphene research
- Sabine Brunswicker, professor for digital innovation and the Founder and Director of Research Center for Open Digital Innovation (RCODI)
- Friedrich Dessauer, pioneer of X-ray technology
- Mikhail Dolivo-Dobrovolsky, inventor of the three-phase electrical motor
- Barbara Drossel, physicist
- José Luis Encarnação, inventor of the Graphical Kernel System
- Paul Friedländer, chemist
- Kurt Hohenemser, aerospace engineer and pioneer in helicopter design
- Karl Küpfmüller, electrical engineer
- El Lissitzky, architect and designer
- Ernst May, architect and city planner of New Frankfurt
- Ernst Neufert, architect
- Gustav Niemann, mechanical engineer
- Fritz von Opel rocket pioneer
- Frank Schimmelfennig, political scientist
- Bernhard Schlink, former judge and writer (The Reader)
- Ernst Schröder, mathematician
- Gerhard M. Sessler, inventor of the electret microphone
- Thomas Sieverts, architect and urban planner
- Rudolf Wille, mathematician
- Hermann Zapf, typeface designer (Palatino, Optima, Zapfino)
- Eduard Zintl, chemist and discoverer of the Zintl phase
- Gustaf Wrede, engineer and politician

== See also ==
- University and State Library Darmstadt
