= Tinix =

- Developer: Yu Yuan
- OS family: Unix-like
- Working state: Current
- Source model: Source-available
- Initial release: 2006; 19 years ago
- Marketing target: Education
- Available in: Chinese
- Update method: Compile from source code
- Platforms: IA-32, x86-64
- Kernel type: Microkernel

Tinix (Try It as miNIX-like operating system), is a tutorial operating system (OS) written by Yu Yuan. Designed primarily to teach fundamentals rather than to do work. In his book "Writing OS DIY", Yu provides all source code for Tinix. Tinix borrows many concepts and methods from Minix. The book compensates for practical computer programming skills, especially in x86 assembly language, lacking in Andrew S. Tanenbaum's book "Operating Systems: Design and Implementation", 1987, 1997, 2006.
