= OSDI =

OSDI can mean:

- Operating Systems: Design and Implementation, a computer science book by Andrew S. Tanenbaum
- The Symposium on Operating Systems Design and Implementation, a computer science conference sponsored by USENIX
- The ICAO code for Damascus International Airport in Syria
- Ocular Surface Disease Index (OSDI), a questionnaire used to diagnose dry eye syndrome
