= Minix 3 =

Unix-like operating system

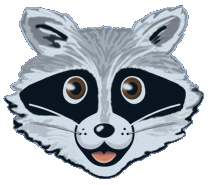

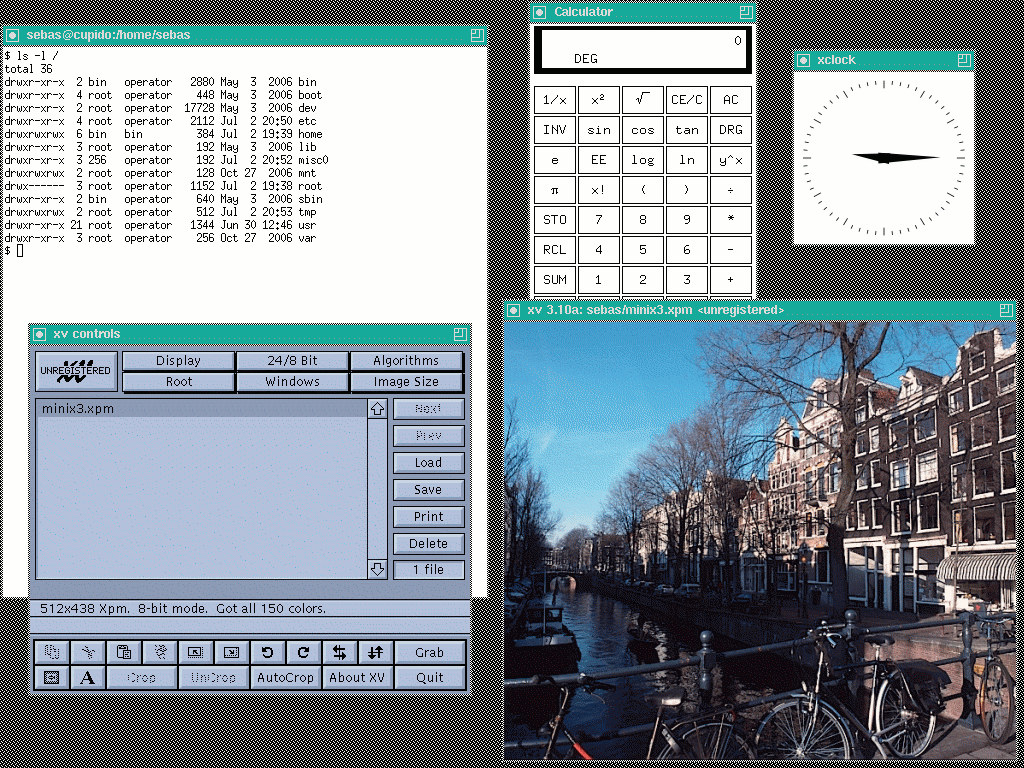
- Minix 3 running X11 with twm as window manager
- Developer: Andrew S. Tanenbaum et al.
- Written in: C, assembly language
- OS family: Unix-like
- Working state: Discontinued
- Source model: Open source
- Initial release: 24 October 2005; 20 years ago
- Latest release: 3.3.0 / September 16, 2014; 11 years ago
- Latest preview: 3.4.0 rc6 / May 9, 2017; 9 years ago
- Repository: git.minix3.org
- Marketing target: Embedded systems, education
- Available in: English
- Supported platforms: IA-32, ARM
- Kernel type: Microkernel
- Userland: Minix, NetBSD
- Default user interface: ash
- License: 2005: BSD-3-Clause (Note: BSD-3-Clause with a fourth clause); Original: BSD-3-Clause
- Preceded by: Minix 1.0, 1.5, and 2.0
- Official website: www.minix3.org

Minix 3 is a small, Unix-like operating system published under a BSD-3-Clause license, and is a successor project to the earlier versions, Minix 1.x and 2.0.

The project's main goal is for the system to be fault-tolerant by detecting and repairing its faults on the fly, with no user intervention. The main uses of the system are envisaged to be embedded systems and education.

As of 2017, Minix 3 supports IA-32 and ARM architecture processors. It can also run on emulators or virtual machines, such as Bochs, VMware Workstation, Microsoft Virtual PC, Oracle VirtualBox, and QEMU. A port to PowerPC architecture is in development. In 2026, an independent Minix 3 fork called MEECHO was released for the 64-bit Arm architecture (AArch64). According to the project documentation, it boots on QEMU and on the Rockchip RK3566-based BIGTREETECH CB2 single-board computer. The distribution comes on a live CD and does not support live USB installation. The project has been dormant since late 2018, and the latest release is 3.4.0 rc6 from 2017, although the Minix 3 discussion group is still active.

Minix 3 is the Intel Management Engine (ME) OS found in Intel's Platform Controller Hub, starting with the introduction of ME 11, which is used with Skylake and Kaby Lake processors. It was debated that Minix could have been the most widely used OS on x86/AMD64 processors, with more installations than Microsoft Windows, Linux, or macOS, because of its use in the Intel ME.

== Goals of the project ==
Structure of monolithic kernel– and microkernel-based operating systems, respectively

Reflecting on the nature of monolithic kernel–based systems, where a driver (which has, according to Minix creator Tanenbaum, approximately 3–7 times as many bugs as a usual program) can bring down the whole system, Minix 3 aims to create an operating system that is a "reliable, self-healing, multiserver Unix clone".

To achieve that, the code running in kernel must be minimal, with the file server, process server, and each device driver running as separate user-mode processes. Each driver is carefully monitored by a part of the system named the reincarnation server. If a driver fails to respond to pings from this server, it is shut down and replaced by a fresh copy of the driver.

In a monolithic system, a bug in a driver can easily crash the whole kernel. This is far less likely to occur in Minix 3.

== History ==
MINIX 3 versions
Version	Release date	Description
3.1.0 (OSDI3)	2005-10-18	The first release of Minix 3 (Book Release), under BSD-3-Clause
3.1.1 (SOSP)	2005-10-24	The last version under the standard BSD-3-Clause license
3.1.2	2006-04-18	The first version under the custom BSD-3-Clause license
3.1.2a	2006-05-29	New Packman package manager; Fixed an installation issue with auto-partitioning disks.
3.1.3	2007-04-13	Added new virtual file system
3.1.3a	2007-06-08	Bug fixes
3.1.4	2009-06-09	Virtual memory support; Improved virtual machine support (when Minix runs as guest)
3.1.5	2009-11-05	Performance improvements; Shared memory; setitimer function; ISO 9660 file system; Open Sound System; Trap NULL accesses now, for user convenience; Improved signal handling; Better support for debuggers (ptrace improvements, etc.); Network card autodetection (for supported PCI cards), improved network configuration
3.1.6	2010-02-08	New Network drivers: Atheros L2, Intel E1000, Realtek 8169, DEC Tulip; PipeFS – removed pipe handling from filesystem drivers; HGFS – support for mounting VMware shared folders as file system; VFS: supplemental group support and sticky bit support; Floating-point unit support; System Event Framework (SEF); Experimental APIC support
3.1.7	2010-06-16	User-space scheduling and a scheduling server; Proper support for multiple Ethernet cards of the same type; Boot monitor allows loading images > 16 MB; Build-system support for building Minix with GCC; Support for Windows-1251 and KOI8-U character sets
3.1.8	2010-10-04	New package management infrastructure: pkgsrc and pkgin; Unix domain socket support; Multiboot support; ext2 support; ACPI driver; full APIC mode including I/O APICs; Experimental AHCI support
3.2.0	2012-02-29	Porting GNU Debugger to Minix 3 and implementing core dumping support; FUSE support with experimental NTFS-3G file system; Gradually replacing userland, from Minix to NetBSD; Replacing the default compiler ACK with Clang; GCC is also supported; Switch to ELF and NetBSD libc libraries; Pkgsrc upstreaming and application porting; Asynchronous virtual filesystem (VFS) server; Replacing the bootloader from Minix to NetBSD; NCQ support in the AHCI driver
3.2.1	2013-02-21	Support for dynamically linked executables; Removal of Intel segments; Dropped support for a.out binaries; Cross-compilation support; Device Driver Environment kit support; VBFS – support for mounting VirtualBox Shared Folder as file system
3.3.0	2014-09-15	ARM architecture support; cross-compilable; Support for mmap() I/O mechanism; allows for shared dynamic libraries and lower memory needs; New input infrastructure: input server and keyboard driver separated from TTY; VND: vnode disk (loopback) block driver; LLVM Bitcode build of the system; Import of LLVM and clang in the sources; Unified block cache shared by FSes and VM; Improved NetBSD compatibility: utilities, calls, types (lots of 64-bit), toolchain, codebase, and packages; C type for messages: cleaner, bigger; Improved driver modularity: UDS separate from PFS, PTY from TTY, one controller per at_wini instance, LOG removed from boot image; Packages are now dynamically linked
3.4.0 rc6	2017-05-09	X11 is now part of the operating system
Book Release; Old release; Current stable release; Current development release

Minix 3 was publicly announced on 24 October 2005 by Andrew Tanenbaum during his keynote speech on top of the Association for Computing Machinery (ACM) Symposium Operating Systems Principles conference. Although it still serves as an example for the third edition of Tanenbaum and Woodhull's textbook (2006), it is comprehensively redesigned to be "usable as a serious system on resource-limited and embedded computers and for applications requiring high reliability."

Initially released under the same BSD-3-Clause license that Minix was licensed under since 2000, in late 2005, the copyright owner was changed and a fourth clause was added.

== Reliability policies ==
One of the main goals of Minix 3 is reliability. Below are some of the more important principles that enhance its reliability.

=== Reduce kernel size ===
Monolithic operating systems such as Linux and FreeBSD and hybrids like Windows have millions of lines of kernel code. In contrast, Minix 3 has about 6,000 lines of executable kernel code, which can make problems easier to find in the code.

=== Cage the bugs ===
In monolithic kernels, device drivers reside in the kernel. Thus, when a new peripheral is installed, unknown, untrusted code is inserted in the kernel. One bad line of code in a driver can bring down the system.

In contrast, in Minix 3, each device driver is a separate user-mode process. Drivers cannot execute privileged instructions, change the page tables, perform arbitrary input/output (I/O), or write to absolute memory. They must make kernel calls for these services and the kernel checks each call for authority.

=== Limit drivers' memory access ===
In monolithic kernels, a driver can write to any word of memory and thus accidentally corrupt user programs.

In Minix 3, when a user expects data from, for example, the MINIX file system, it builds a descriptor telling who has access and at what addresses. It passes an index to this descriptor to the file system, which may pass it to a driver. The file system or driver then asks the kernel to write via the descriptor, making it impossible for them to write to addresses outside the buffer.

=== Survive bad pointers ===
Dereferencing a bad pointer within a driver will crash the driver process, but will not affect the system as a whole. The reincarnation server will restart the crashed driver automatically. Users will not notice recovery for some drivers (e.g., disk and network) but for others (e.g., audio and printer), they might. In monolithic kernels, dereferencing a bad pointer in a driver normally leads to a system crash.

=== Tame infinite loops ===
If a driver gets into an infinite loop, the scheduler will gradually lower its priority until it becomes idle. Eventually the reincarnation server will see that it is not responding to status requests, so it will kill and restart the looping driver. In a monolithic kernel, a looping driver could hang the system.

=== Limit damage from buffer overflows ===
Minix 3 uses fixed-length messages for internal communication, which eliminates certain buffer overflows and buffer management problems. Also, many exploits work by overrunning a buffer to trick the program into returning from a function call using an overwritten stack return address pointing into attacker controlled memory, usually the overrun buffer. In Minix 3, this attack is mitigated because instruction and data space are split and only code in (read-only) instruction space can be executed, termed executable-space protection. However, attacks which rely on running legitimately executable memory in a malicious way (return-to-libc, return-oriented programming) are not prevented by this mitigation.

=== Restrict access to kernel functions ===
Device drivers obtain kernel services (such as copying data to users' address spaces) by making kernel calls. The Minix 3 kernel has a bit map for each driver specifying which calls it is authorized to make. In monolithic kernels, every driver can call every kernel function, authorized or not.

=== Restrict access to I/O ports ===
The kernel maintains a table telling which I/O ports each driver may access. Thus, a driver can only touch its own I/O ports. In monolithic kernels, a buggy driver can access I/O ports belonging to another device.

=== Restrict communication with OS components ===
Not every driver and server needs to communicate with every other driver and server. Accordingly, a per-process bit map determines which destinations each process may send to.

=== Reincarnate dead or sick drivers ===
A special process, called the reincarnation server, periodically pings each device driver. If the driver dies or fails to respond correctly to pings, the reincarnation server automatically replaces it with a fresh copy. Detecting and replacing non-functioning drivers is automatic, with no user action needed. This feature does not work for disk drivers at present, but in the next release the system will be able to recover even disk drivers, which will be shadowed in random-access memory (RAM). Driver recovery does not affect running processes.

=== Integrate interrupts and messages ===
When an interrupt occurs, it is converted at a low level to a notification sent to the appropriate driver. If the driver is waiting for a message, it gets the interrupt immediately; otherwise it gets the notification the next time it does a RECEIVE to get a message. This scheme eliminates nested interrupts and makes driver programming easier.

== Architecture ==
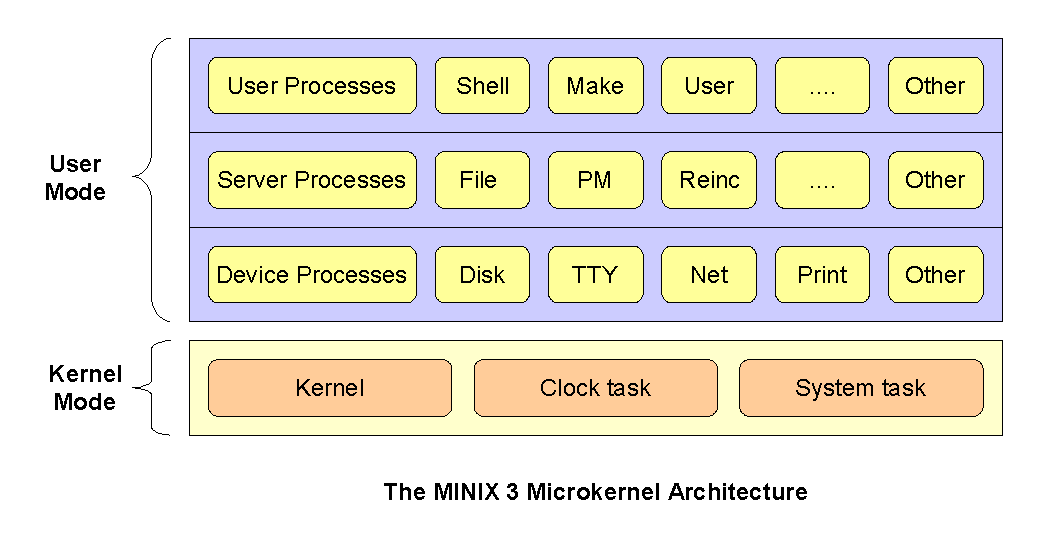
The architecture of Minix 3

As can be seen, at the bottom level is the microkernel, which is about 4,000 lines of code (mostly in C, plus a small amount of assembly language). It handles interrupts, scheduling, and message passing. It also supports an application programming interface (API) of about 30 kernel calls that authorized servers and drivers can make. User programs cannot make these calls. Instead, they can issue POSIX system calls which send messages to the servers. The kernel calls perform functions such as setting interrupts and copying data between address spaces.

At the next level up are the device drivers, each one running as a separate userland process. Each one controls some I/O device, such as a disk or printer. The drivers do not have access to the I/O port space and cannot issue I/O instructions directly. Instead, they must make kernel calls giving a list of I/O ports to write to and the values to be written. While this scheme incurs a small amount of overhead (typically 500 ns), it allows the kernel to check authorization, so that, for example, the audio driver cannot write to the disk.

At the next level are the servers. This is where nearly all the operating system functionality is located. User processes obtain file service, for example, by sending messages to the file server to open, close, read, and write files. In turn, the file server gets disk I/O performed by sending messages to the disk driver, which controls the disk.

One of the key servers is the reincarnation server. Its job is to poll all the other servers and drivers to check on their health periodically. If a component fails to respond correctly, or exits, or gets into an infinite loop, the reincarnation server (which is the parent process of the drivers and servers) kills the faulty component and replaces it with a fresh copy. In this way the system is automatically self-healing without interfering with running programs.

Currently the reincarnation server, the process server, and the microkernel are part of the trusted computing base. If any of them fail, the system crashes. Nevertheless, reducing the trusted computing base from 3-5 million lines of code, as in Linux and Windows systems, to about 20,000 lines greatly enhances system reliability.

== Differences between Minix 3 and prior versions ==
Diagram of the relationships between several Unix-like systems

Minix 1.0, 1.5, and 2.0 were developed as tools to help people learn about the design of operating systems.

Minix 1.0, released in 1987, was 12,000 lines of C and some x86 assembly language. Source code of the kernel, memory manager, and file system of Minix 1.0 are printed in the book. Tanenbaum originally developed Minix for compatibility with the IBM PC and IBM PC/AT microcomputers available at the time.

Minix 1.5, released in 1991, included support for MicroChannel IBM PS/2 systems and was also ported to the Motorola 68000 and SPARC architectures, supporting the Atari ST, Commodore Amiga, Apple Macintosh and Sun Microsystems SPARCstation computer platforms. A version of Minix running as a user process under SunOS was also available.

Minix 2.0, released in 1997, was only available for the x86 and Solaris-hosted SPARC architectures. Minix-vmd was created by two Vrije Universiteit researchers, and added virtual memory and support for the X Window System (X11).

Minix 3 does the same, and provides a modern operating system with many newer tools and many Unix applications. Prof. Tanenbaum once said:

Please be aware that MINIX 3 is not your grandfather's MINIX ... MINIX 1 was written as an educational tool ... MINIX 3 is that plus a start at building a highly reliable, self-healing, bloat-free operating system ... MINIX 1 and MINIX 3 are related in the same way as Windows 3.1 and Windows XP are: same first name.

Many improvements have also been made in the structure of the kernel since the Minix 2 release, making the system more reliable.

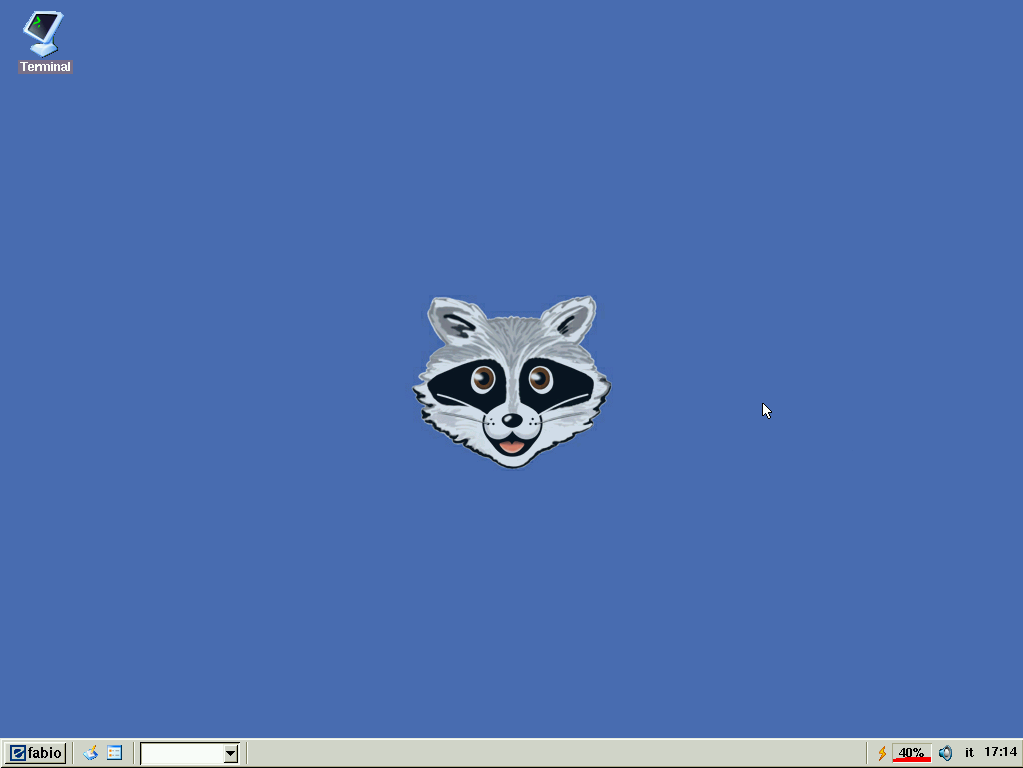
Minix 3.1.7 running X Window System (X11) with the Equinox Desktop Environment (EDE)

Minix version 3.1.5 was released 5 November 2009. It contains X11, Emacs, vi, cc, GCC, Perl, Python, Almquist shell, Bash, Z shell, FTP client, SSH client, Telnet client, Pine, and over 400 other common Unix utility programs. With the addition of X11, this version marks the transition away from a text-only system. Another feature of this version, which will be improved in future ones, is the ability of the system to withstand device driver crashes, and in many cases having them automatically replaced without affecting running processes. In this way, Minix is self-healing and can be used in applications demanding high reliability.

Minix 3.2.0 was released in February 2012. This version has many new features, including the Clang compiler, experimental symmetric multiprocessing support, procfs and ext2fs filesystem support, and GNU Debugger (GDB). Several parts of NetBSD are also integrated in the release, including the bootloader, libc and various utilities and other libraries.

Minix 3.3.0 was released in September 2014. This release is the first version to support the ARM architecture in addition to x86. It also supports a NetBSD userland, with thousands of NetBSD packages running right out of the box.

== Compared to other teaching operating systems ==
System	Lines of code	Kernel type	Language	Hardware environment	Lacks (vs others)
Minix 1	~12k	Microkernel	C	x86-16	?
Minix 2	~23k	Microkernel	C	x86-32	?
Minix 3	~100k+	Microkernel	C	x86-32	—N/a
Nachos	~15k	No kernel. User-space OS simulator	C++	MIPS simulator	SMP, paging, real hardware
Pintos	~25k	Monolithic	C	x86 (typically under QEMU/Bochs)	SMP, user-space drivers
Xinu	~10k	Monolithic	C	x86 / ARM	SMP, paging, virtual memory
xv6	~10k	Monolithic	C	x86 / x86-64 / RISC-V	user-space drivers, POSIX layer

== Mascot ==
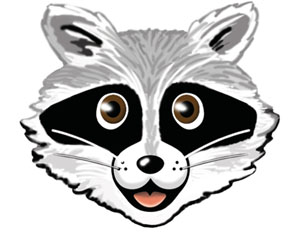
Rocky Raccoon, the mascot of Minix 3

Rocky Raccoon is the mascot of Minix 3.

== MINIXCon ==
MINIXCon is a conference for sharing talks, efforts and research related to Minix.

It was held once in 2016. MINIXCon2017 was cancelled due to lack of talks submitted.

== See also ==
- Comparison of operating system kernels
- List of computing mascots
- Category:Computing mascots
