= Pintos =

Pintos can refer to:

- Binaki (also called "pintos"), type of steamed corn tamales originating in the Philippines
- Chungbo Pintos, former name of the now-defunct South Korean baseball team Hyundai Unicorns
- Pintos (surname)
- Pintos (operating system), teaching operating system for 80x86

== See also ==
- Pinto (disambiguation)
