= Modern Operating Systems =

Book by Andrew S. Tanenbaum

- First edition, 1992
- Author: Andrew S. Tanenbaum (and Herbert Bos for 4th and 5th editions)
- Language: English, German
- Series: Learning
- Subject: covers current UNIX® standards (POSIX.1-2001 /SUSv3 and POSIX.1-2008 /SUSv4 )
- Published: 1st edition 1992; 2nd edition 2001; 3rd edition 2007; 4th edition March 20, 2014; 5th edition 2022
- Publisher: Prentice Hall (1st-3rd); Pearson PLC (4th-5th)
- Pages: 1101
- ISBN: 978-0133591620

Page 851: Simplified illustration of the structure of the Linux kernel.

Modern Operating Systems is a book written by Andrew Tanenbaum, a version of his book Operating Systems: Design and Implementation which does not target implementation. It is now in its 5th edition, published October 2022 (ISBN 9780137618880), written together with Herbert Bos.

Modern Operating Systems (mostly known as MOS) is a popular book across the globe and includes the fundamentals of an operating system with small amounts of code written in autonomous C language. MOS describes many scheduling algorithms.
