= Henri Bal =

Dutch scientist (born 1958)

Henri E. Bal
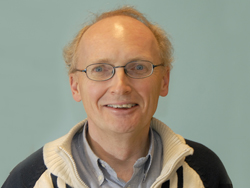
- Born: 16 April 1958 (age 68)
- Education: Vrije Universiteit
- Scientific career
- Fields: Computer science
- Workplaces: Vrije Universiteit
- Doctoral advisor: Andrew S. Tanenbaum
- Doctoral students: Werner Vogels

Henri Elle Bal (born 16 April 1958) is a professor of computer science at the Vrije Universiteit, Amsterdam in the Netherlands. He is a well-known researcher in computer systems with a specialization in parallel computer systems, languages, and applications.

== Education ==
Bal received his engineer's degree from the Delft University of Technology in mathematics cum laude in 1982. Shortly after graduating, he moved to the Vrije Universiteit where he began doing research on optimizing compilers in the Computer Systems group under the direction of Prof. Andrew Tanenbaum. This work was so promising that Tanenbaum encouraged Bal to become a PhD student in his group. Bal's PhD research led to the development of the Orca programming language, one of the first programming languages intended for large-scale cluster computers. Unlike most other parallel programming languages, Orca is based on the shared-data object model, which allows a group of computers to have the illusion that they share data objects in a common memory. Programs can operate on these objects as though they were local, even though the only copy may be stored on a different machine. The run-time system maintains this illusion by replicating data automatically as needed and maintaining consistency between the copies. His PhD thesis, under Tanenbaum's supervision, was sufficiently influential that it was later published by Prentice-Hall as a book entitled Programming Distributed Systems.

== Career ==
After getting his PhD degree, Bal was a postdoctoral fellow at MIT in Cambridge, Massachusetts, at the University of Arizona in Tucson, Arizona, and at Imperial College in London. He then came back to the Vrije Universiteit as an assistant professor. Shortly thereafter he was awarded a 'Pionier' grant from the Dutch National Science Foundation, the most prestigious award then available to young researchers. He used the grant of 1.6 million guilders (about $1 million) to start a research group on parallel programming. In 1994 he became an associate professor and in 1998 he became a full professor. His work has continued to focus on cluster computers, parallel programming languages, and parallel applications.

Together with one of his students, John Romein, he solved the game of awari, a 3500-year-old game by cleverly enumerating all the possible positions reachable from the current position and choosing the best move, usually leading to a forced win. A paper about this research, entitled "Solving the Game of Awari using Parallel Retrograde Analysis" was published in IEEE Computer, Oct. 2003 and received worldwide publicity.

Bal has had about a dozen PhD students and has written nearly 100 scientific papers in leading computer science conferences and journals. He was also the driving force behind the acquisition and use of three large distributed cluster computers called the Distributed ASCI Supercomputer. Bal has also been a member of over 30 program committees, and as such has had a major impact on the field of parallel computing. He is currently adjunct director of the $50 million VL-e research project as well as being a professor.

== Honors ==
- Numerous invited lectures and keynote addresses at conferences (e.g., IEEE Cluster 2000; CANPC '00; Global Grid Forum, 2001)
- Member of the IEEE CS European Distinguished Visitor's Program
- Best Paper Award at Int'l Conf. on Parallel Processing, 1998
- Elected member of Academia Europaea (2013)

== Books ==
Bal is the author or coauthor of three influential books:

- Programming Distributed Systems, Prentice-Hall, 1991
- Programming Language Essentials (with Dick Grune), Addison-Wesley, 1994
- Modern Compiler Design (with Dick Grune, Ceriel Jacobs, and Koen Langendoen), Wiley, 2000
