= Electoral-vote.com =

American political website

- Website type: Opinion poll analysis, blog
- Available in: English
- Owner: Andrew S. Tanenbaum
- Creator: Andrew S. Tanenbaum
- Website: www.electoral-vote.com
- Registration: None
- Launched: May 24, 2004; 22 years ago (as Electoral Vote Predictor)

Electoral-vote.com is a website created by computer scientist Andrew S. Tanenbaum. The site's primary content was originally poll analysis to project election outcomes. Since the 2016 elections, the site also has featured daily commentary on political news stories.

The site was created during the lead-up to the 2004 U.S. Presidential election to predict the winner. The site tries to improve on national polls usually reported in the media, by instead analyzing the most recent polls on the state level, thus simulating the process by which Electoral College votes are determined in the actual election. Updated throughout the campaign, visitors can see who is "ahead" at any time.

On weekends the site focuses more on interacting with readers, with Tanenbaum and co-author Christopher Bates answering reader questions on Saturdays and posting a mailbag of reader letters on Sundays.

Political commentators, such as Chris Weigant, have noted the helpfulness of the website in aggregating polls state by state in order to predict the outcomes of elections.

== Staff ==
The content is produced by Andrew Tanenbaum and Christopher Bates. Tanenbaum is a member of Democrats Abroad (he is a long-time resident of the Netherlands) and generally supports Democratic candidates for office. For the first few months of the website's existence Tanenbaum went by the alias "the Votemaster", keeping his identity a secret. He revealed his identity on November 1, 2004, as well as stating his reasons and qualifications for running the website.

In 2015, Tanenbaum was joined by Christopher Bates, who contributes to the site under the name Zenger, chosen in honor of John Peter Zenger. Their respective contributions are differentiated by (V) and (Z). In December 2024, they were joined by Alison Regan, who contributes under the name Lockwood, or (L), in honor of Belva Ann Lockwood. In 2025, Sari Kaufman was introduced as a contributor identified as (A), presumably after Ann Smith Franklin. Kaufman had been helping correct errors on the site for some time, but would thenceforth appear occasionally under her own nom-de-plume.

== History ==
=== 2004 Presidential election ===
The site began operating on May 24, 2004 with a simple map and a few links to other pages. During the months leading up to the 2004 U.S. Presidential election, the site was updated daily to reflect new state polls. The site was the most popular election site in the country, in the top 1,000 Web sites in the world, and in the top 10 blogs in the world. In November 2004, the website had more than 650,000 hits per day.

The main page consisted of a map of the United States with the individual states colored varying shades of red or blue, based on the polls for that state. For instance, Illinois, a state that was polling strongly for Democrat John Kerry was colored dark blue, whereas Michigan where Kerry's lead polled by a small margin was colored light blue. Analogously, Texas was dark red during the whole campaign, indicating Bush's strong lead there. All of the polling data were provided in multiple formats, including HTML, Excel, and .csv for downloading. Other features included historical data on previous elections, charts and animations showing the polls over the course of time, cartograms, and links to hundreds of other pages and external Websites with tables, charts, graphs, and other election data and information.

The main algorithm just used the most recent poll(s) in every state. If two polls came out on the same day, they were averaged. This algorithm used all published polls, including those by partisan pollsters such as Strategic Vision (R) and Hart Research (D). A second algorithm used only nonpartisan polls and averaged all polls during the past three days. A third algorithm used historical data to predict how undecided voters would break. Maps for each of the algorithms were given every day, but the first one got most of the publicity since it was on the main page.

The site's final tracking using algorithm 1 posted on Election Day, November 2 gave 262 electoral votes to John Kerry and 261 to George W. Bush, with 15 tossups. The second algorithm (averaging 3 days worth of nonpartisan polls) gave Kerry 245 and Bush 278 with 15 tossups. The third algorithm (predicting the undecideds) predicted 281 for Kerry and 257 for Bush.

The actual vote gave Kerry 252 to Bush's 286.

=== 2006 Senate and House elections ===
On September 6, 2006, the site began tracking the 2006 Congressional elections in the Senate. Shortly thereafter, the House of Representatives was added. The map on the site's front page displayed polling for the 2006 Senate races. For House races, the site featured a "Hot House Races" page with links to Wikipedia articles on the candidates, links to the candidates' official websites, and notes on the races. The relatively small number of House election polls as well as 2004's House vote totals were used to project the makeup of the House on the site's front page. The site correctly predicted the winners in all 33 Senate races.

=== 2008 Presidential, Senate, and House elections ===
In late December 2006, the site began its 2008 coverage, which included the presidential race, all 33 Senate races, and about 40 House races that had been close in 2006 and were expected to be highly contested in 2008. For each of the known presidential, senatorial and House candidates, a photo was given, linked to the candidate's Wikipedia entry, along with a brief description of the candidate and race. The site also had four new maps: one showing the 2004 presidential election, one showing the governors by state, one showing the senate by state and finally one showing the House delegations by state. Polling data was presented daily beginning in December 2007 with data from the primaries.

Polling data was presented daily on the likely outcome of the primaries as well as upcoming trends.

The site's electoral vote prediction for the 2008 election was very close to the actual outcome, correctly projecting the winner of every state except for Indiana, and showing Missouri (won by John McCain by only 0.13% of the vote) as a pure tossup. The Senate projection was also close to the actual outcome, predicting 34 of the 35 decided states correctly, including correctly showing a Democratic pickup in Alaska and incorrectly showing the Republican Senator Norm Coleman holding his seat in Minnesota. The Senate results of the Minnesota election was so close that it was contested until the state supreme court ruled in favor of Al Franken on June 30, 2009.

=== 2010 Senate and House elections ===
In 2010 the site projected 51 seats held by Democrats, 48 by Republicans, and 1 by Lisa Murkowski (a Republican running a write-in campaign). It was incorrect about Colorado and Nevada, which instead went to Democrats. It projected 202 House seats held by Democrats, 216 seats held by Republicans, with 17 too close to call. The actual outcome was 195 Democrats and 240 Republicans.

=== 2012 Presidential and Senate elections ===
In 2012 the site projected the electoral votes for Barack Obama and Mitt Romney, and the Senate. Its final analysis predicted 303 electoral votes for Obama, and 220 for Romney, with 15 votes (North Carolina's) too close to call. The actual outcome was 332 to 206; North Carolina went to Romney, but Florida instead went to Obama. Its final projection for the Senate was 51 seats held by Democrats, 45 by Republicans, 1 by independent Angus King (an ally of the Democrats), and 3 too close to call (Montana, Wyoming, North Dakota); Montana and North Dakota elected Democrats.

=== 2014 Senate elections ===
In 2014 the site projected 47 Senate seats held by Democrats, 52 by Republicans, and 1 too close to call (Kansas). The actual outcome was 46 Democrats and 54 Republicans, with Kansas and North Carolina instead going to Republicans.

=== 2016 Presidential election ===
Tanenbaum resumed updating the site in 2015 with daily commentary on the presidential candidates, joined in September by UCLA-trained historian Christopher Bates. During the primaries, the site tracked the leading candidates' expected delegate counts, and progress toward nomination. After the primaries, it began projections based on the polling to date. The site projected that Hillary Clinton would receive 317 electoral votes, and Donald Trump would receive 215, compared to the actual "upset" result: 232 for Clinton and 306 for Trump. Following the election, Tanenbaum and Bates updated the site with daily links to news items and commentary about them. Years later, they noted that Trump's victory was the most shocking upset in their experience following politics.

=== 2018 Senate elections ===
In early September 2018 the site began tracking polling information for Senate races. The site projected 48 Senate seats held by Democrats, 50 by Republicans, and 2 too close to call (Arizona and Missouri). The actual outcome was 47 Democrats and 53 Republicans, with Florida and Indiana instead going to Republicans.

=== 2020 Presidential and Senate elections ===
In 2020 the site projected the electoral votes for Joe Biden and Donald Trump, and the Senate. Its final analysis predicted 350 electoral votes for Biden, and 170 for Trump, with 18 votes (Ohio's) too close to call. Bates predicted that Trump would carry Ohio but Biden would receive one of Nebraska's votes for a final tally of 351-187; Tanenbaum was more cautious about predicting the outcome in toss-up states but did predict a Biden victory. The actual outcome was 306 to 232; North Carolina and Florida both went to Trump rather than Biden along with one of Maine's votes.

The website's final projection for the Senate was 54 seats held by Democrats, 46 by Republicans. The actual outcome was a 50-50 senate because 4 states (Montana, Iowa, North Carolina, and Maine) elected Republicans rather than Democrats.

=== 2022 Senate elections ===
On the morning of election day 2022, the site predicted 49 Senate seats held by Democrats and 50 by Republicans, with one, Georgia, too close to call. The site's predictions were correct except for Nevada, which went instead to the Democrats. A month later, Georgia held a runoff election, and the Democrats won this seat too, giving a final total of 51 Democrats (including independents who caucus with them) and 49 Republicans.

=== 2024 Presidential and Senate elections ===
In the presidential election of 2024, the site predicted the electoral votes of Kamala Harris and Donald Trump. The final prediction on the morning of Election Day showed Harris winning the swing states of Pennsylvania, Michigan, Wisconsin, and Nevada, and Trump winning the swing states of North Carolina, Georgia, and Arizona, giving a total of 276 electoral votes for Harris and 262 for Trump. Tanenbaum affirmed these predictions, while Bates predicted that Harris would win North Carolina but Trump would win Nevada, a 286-252 margin for Harris. In the election, Trump won all the swing states, giving him 312 electoral votes to Harris' 226. Tanenbaum's observation that "most of the swing states go the same way" proved to be correct.

In the Senate, the site predicted that the Republicans would win easily in West Virginia and narrowly in Montana and Ohio, giving them 52 seats in the next Congress, while the Democrats would hold their other vulnerable seats but not gain any. They got all the states right except Pennsylvania, where David McCormick narrowly defeated incumbent Bob Casey Jr., giving the Republicans 53 seats.

=== 2026 Senate elections ===
On Election Day, the site predicted Senate seats in Alaska, Iowa, Kansas, Maine, North Carolina, Ohio, and Texas would flip from Republican to Democratic hands, giving the Democrats and their independent allies 54 seats in the next Congress. The Democrats won all of the above plus upset victories in South Carolina and Mississippi, giving them 56 seats to the Republicans' 44.

== See also ==
- Fivethirtyeight.com
- Real Clear Politics
