= Pintos (operating system) =

Simple instructional operating system

- Original author: Ben Pfaff
- Developer: Ben Pfaff
- Release: 2004; 22 years ago
- Written in: C
- Platform: x86
- Available in: English
- License: BSD-like
- Website: web.stanford.edu/class/cs140/projects/pintos/pintos_1.html

Pintos is a simple instructional operating system framework for the x86 instruction set architecture. It supports kernel threads, loading and running user programs, and a file system, but it implements all of these in a very simple way.

Pintos is currently used by multiple institutions, including UT Austin, UC Berkeley, UC Santa Cruz, University at Buffalo, Linköping University, Peter the Great St. Petersburg Polytechnic University and Imperial College London, as an academic aid in Operating Systems class curriculums.

== History ==
It was created at Stanford University by Ben Pfaff in 2004. It originated as a replacement for Not Another Completely Heuristic Operating System (Nachos), a similar system originally developed at UC Berkeley by Thomas E. Anderson, and was designed along similar lines.

=== Comparison to Nachos ===
Like Nachos, Pintos is intended to introduce undergraduates to concepts in operating system design and implementation by requiring them to implement significant portions of a real operating system, including thread and memory management and file system access. Pintos also teaches students valuable debugging skills.

Unlike Nachos, Pintos can run on actual x86 hardware, though it is often run atop an x86 emulator, such as Bochs or QEMU. Nachos, by contrast, runs as a user process on a host operating system, and targets the MIPS architecture (Nachos code must run atop a MIPS simulator). Pintos and its accompanying assignments are also written in the programming language C instead of C++ (used for original Nachos) or Java (used for Nachos 5.0j).

== Compared to other teaching operating systems ==
System	Lines of code	Kernel type	Language	Hardware environment	Lacks (vs others)
Minix 1	~12k	Microkernel	C	x86-16	?
Minix 2	~23k	Microkernel	C	x86-32	?
Minix 3	~100k+	Microkernel	C	x86-32	—N/a
Nachos	~15k	No kernel. User-space OS simulator	C++	MIPS simulator	SMP, paging, real hardware
Pintos	~25k	Monolithic	C	x86 (typically under QEMU/Bochs)	SMP, user-space drivers
Xinu	~10k	Monolithic	C	x86 / ARM	SMP, paging, virtual memory
xv6	~10k	Monolithic	C	x86 / x86-64 / RISC-V	user-space drivers, POSIX layer
