= Pintos (surname) =

Pintos is a surname. Notable people with the surname include:

- Abel Pintos, Argentine singer-songwriter
- Alejo Garcia Pintos, Argentine actor
- Álvaro Pintos, Uruguayan football manager and former football striker
- Antonio Vico y Pintos, Spanish stage actor
- Federico Pintos, Uruguayan football attacking midfielder
- Fidel Pintos, Argentine film actor
- Gonzalo Aquilino Pintos, Argentine football forward
- Guillermo Pintos, Spanish Army officer
- José Pintos (born 1964), Uruguayan footballer
- Mathías Pintos (born 1999), Uruguayan football defender
- Pablo Pintos (born 1987), Uruguayan footballer
- Santiago Gabriel Martínez Pintos, Uruguayan football central midfielder
- Susana Pintos (1939–1968), Uruguayan student protester
