= Douglas Comer =

American computer scientist

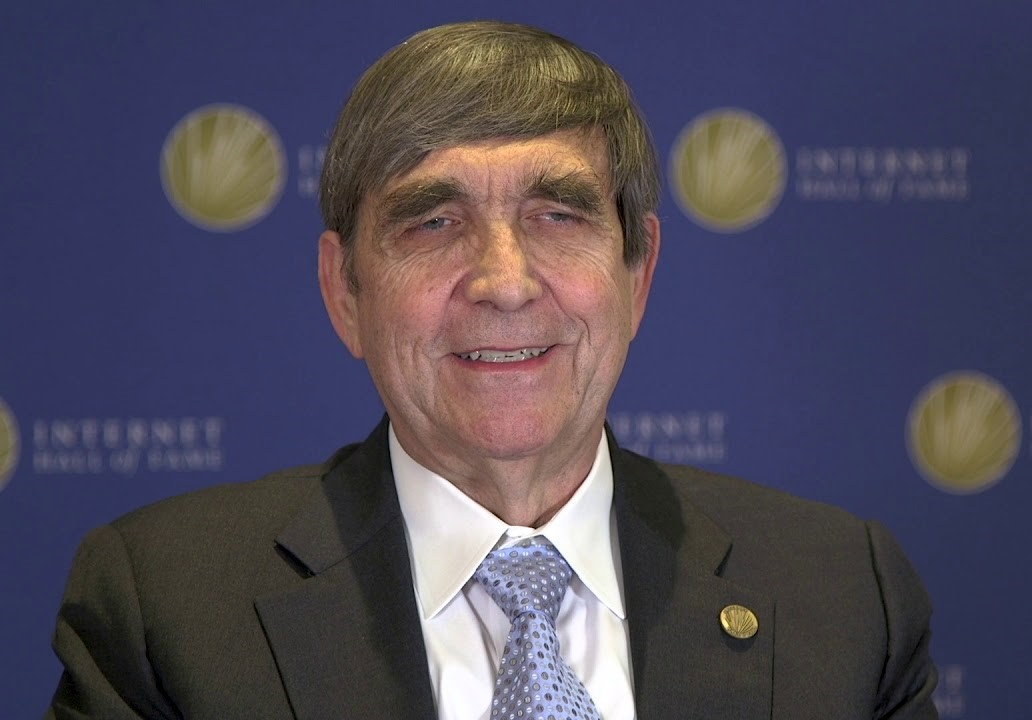
Douglas Earl Comer, 2019

Douglas Earl Comer is a professor of computer science at Purdue University, where he teaches courses on operating systems and computer networks. He has written numerous research papers and textbooks, and currently heads several networking research projects. He has been involved in TCP/IP and internetworking since the late 1970s, and is an internationally recognized authority. He designed and implemented X25NET and Cypress networks, and the Xinu operating system. He is director of the Internetworking Research Group at Purdue, editor of Software - Practice and Experience, and a former member of the Internet Architecture Board. Comer completed the original version of Xinu (and wrote correspondent book The Xinu Approach) in 1979. Since then, Xinu has been expanded and ported to a wide variety of platforms, including: IBM PC, Macintosh, Digital Equipment Corporation VAX and DECstation 3100, Sun Microsystems Sun-2, Sun-3 and SPARCstations, and Intel Pentium. It has been used as the basis for many research projects. Furthermore, Xinu has been used as an embedded system in products by companies such as Motorola, Mitsubishi, Hewlett-Packard, and Lexmark.

== Education and career ==
Comer holds a BS in Mathematics and Physics from Houghton College earned in 1971 and a PhD in Computer Science from Pennsylvania State University earned in 1976. He is a Distinguished Professor of Computer Science and professor of electrical and computer engineering at Purdue University in the US. Beginning in the late 1970s he started his continuing research into TCP/IP, which has earned him international fame in the field of Computer Science and computer networking.

== Achievements ==
Douglas Comer headed a number of research projects associated with the creation of the Internet, and is the author of a number of books on Operating Systems, the Internet and TCP/IP networking, and computer architecture.

Comer is also the developer of the Xinu operating system.

Comer is well known for his series of ground breaking textbooks on computer networks, the Internet, computer operating systems, and computer architecture. His books have been translated into sixteen languages, and are widely used in both industry and academia. Comer's three-volume series Internetworking With TCP/IP is often cited as an authoritative reference for the Internet protocols.

For twenty years, Comer served as editor-in-chief of the research journal Software—Practice And Experience, published by John Wiley & Sons. Comer is a Fellow of the ACM and the recipient of numerous teaching awards.

== Research Grants ==
- Csnet Protocol Development – 1981
- High-Level Network Protocols: Computer Research – 1983
- Feasibility Studies of High-Performance Communication Over Public Packet-Switched Networks – 1984
- Cypress: A Proposed Cost Effective Packet-Switched Interconnection Strategy – 1985
- Shadow Editing – 1986
- Computer Research Equipment – 1987
- Extensible Terascale Facility (ETF): Indiana-Purdue Grid (IP-grid) – 2003
- FIA: Collaborative Research: NEBULA: A Future Internet That Supports Trustworthy Cloud Computing – 2010

== Publications ==
Comer has authored numerous research papers and seventeen popular textbooks that have been translated into sixteen languages.

=== Networks and Internets (including TCP/IP Protocols) ===
- Internetworking With TCP/IP Volume III: Client-Server Programming and Applications, AT&T TLI Version – 1996
- Internetworking With TCP/IP Volume III: Client-Server Programming and Applications, BSD Socket Version – 1996
- Internetworking With TCP/IP Volume III: Client-Server Programming and Applications, Windows Sockets Version – 1997
- Internetworking With TCP/IP Volume II: Design, Implementation, and Internals – 1999
- Internetworking With TCP/IP Volume III: Client-Server Programming and Applications, Linux/POSIX Socket Version – 2000
- Hands-on Networking with Internet Applications – 2004
- Network Systems Design Using Network Processors – 2004
- Network Systems Design Using Network Processors, Agere version – 2005
- Automated Network Management Systems – 2006
- Network Systems Design Using Network Processors, Intel 2xxx version – 2006
- The Internet Book: Everything you need to know about computer networking and how the Internet works – 2007
- Internetworking With TCP/IP Volume 1: Principles, Protocols, and Architecture, 6th edition – 2013
- Computer Networks And Internets Sixth Edition – 2014
- The Cloud Computing Book -- The Future Of Computing Explained - 2021

== Publications ==
- Operating System Design Volume 2: Internetworking with XINU. Prentice-Hall. 1987. ISBN 013637414X.
- Operating System Design Volume 1: The XINU Approach, PC version. Prentice-Hall. 1988. ISBN 0136381804.
- Operating System Design Volume 1: The XINU Approach, Macintosh version. Prentice-Hall. 1989. ISBN 013638529X.
- Operating System Design: The Xinu Approach (2nd ed.). Chapman & Hall. 2015. ISBN 9781498712439.
- Essentials Of Computer Architecture (3rd ed.). Chapman & Hall. 2024. ISBN 9781032727196.
- Operating System Design: The Xinu Approach (3rd ed.). Chapman & Hall. 2025. ISBN 9781032980997.

== Awards ==
- Usenix "The Flame" Lifetime Achievement Award (as part of the Software Tools Project) – 1996
- Listed in Purdue University Book of Great Teachers – 1999
- Fellow of the ACM – 2000
- Fellow of the Purdue University Teaching Academy – 2003
- School of Electrical and Computer Engineering, Courtesy Appointment – 2003
- Purdue University Distinguished Professor – 2004
- Joel and Ruth Spira Excellence in Teaching Award – 2012
- Internet Hall of Fame - 2019
