= Mathías Pintos =

Uruguayan footballer (born 1999)

Personal information
- Full name: Mathías Rodrigo Pintos Chagas
- Date of birth: 26 December 1999 (age 26)
- Place of birth: Montevideo, Uruguay
- Height: 1.74 m (5 ft 9 in)
- Position: Defender

Team information
- Current team: Miramar Misiones
- Number: 6

Youth career
- 2013–2017: Liverpool Montevideo

Senior career*
Years	Team	Apps	(Gls)
2017–2022	Liverpool Montevideo	35	(0)
2019–2020	→ Peñarol (loan)	2	(0)
2022–	Miramar Misiones	25	(0)

International career^{‡}
2017	Uruguay U17	1	(0)
2018	Uruguay U20	3	(0)
- * Club domestic league appearances and goals as of 2 June 2024 ‡ National team caps and goals as of 27 May 2018

Mathías Rodrigo Pintos Chagas (born 26 December 1999) is a Uruguayan footballer who plays as a defender for Miramar Misiones in the Uruguayan Primera División.

== Career ==
=== Peñarol ===
In January 2019, Pintos joined Peñarol on a three-year loan, joining the club's youth team. Pintos made his first team debut for the club on 17 October 2020 in a 2-1 defeat to River Plate.
