= Minix =

Unix-like operating system

MINIX
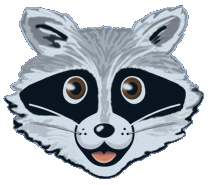

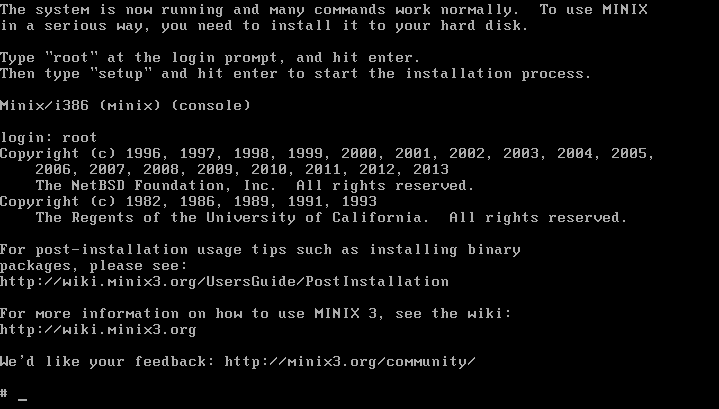
- The MINIX 3.3.0 login prompt
- Developer: Andrew S. Tanenbaum, et al.
- Written in: C, Assembly language
- Working state: Abandoned
- Source model: Open-source
- Initial release: 1987; 39 years ago
- Latest release: 3.3.0 / 16 September 2014; 12 years ago
- Latest preview: 3.4.0rc6 / 9 May 2017; 9 years ago
- Repository: git.minix3.org
- Marketing target: Teaching (v1, v2); Embedded systems (v3)
- Available in: English
- Update method: Compile from source code
- Package manager: N/A
- Supported platforms: IBM PC compatibles, 68000, SPARC, Atari ST, Amiga, Macintosh, SPARCstation, Intel 386, NS32532, ARM, Inmos transputer, Intel Management Engine
- Kernel type: Microkernel
- Userland: BSD (NetBSD)
- License: 2005: BSD 3-Clause (Note: BSD 3-Clause with a fourth clause); 2000: BSD 3-Clause; 1995: Proprietary; 1987: Proprietary
- Official website: www.minix3.org

MINIX is a family of Unix-like operating systems based on a microkernel architecture, written by American-Dutch computer scientist Andrew S. Tanenbaum. First released in 1987, it was designed as a clone of the Unix operating system and one that could run on affordable, Intel 8086-based home computers (IBM PC and PC/AT) for use in classrooms by computer science students at universities.

Its name comes from mini-Unix, and it has no relation to the older MINIX from Digital Systems House, Inc. based on AT&T Unix code. It was initially proprietary source-available, but was relicensed under the BSD 3-Clause to become free and open-source in 2000. MINIX was ported to various additional platforms in the 1990s, and version 2.0, released in 1997, was the first to be POSIX compliant. Starting with MINIX 3, released in 2005, the primary aim of development shifted from education to the creation of a highly reliable and self-healing microkernel OS.

== Implementation ==
=== MINIX 1.0 ===
Andrew S. Tanenbaum created MINIX at Vrije Universiteit in Amsterdam to exemplify the principles conveyed in his textbook Operating Systems: Design and Implementation by Prentice-Hall (1987), which also contained an abridged 12,010 lines of the C source code of the kernel, memory manager, and file system. Prentice-Hall also released the source code and executable binaries on floppy disk with a reference manual. MINIX 1 was system-call compatible with Seventh Edition Unix.

=== MINIX 1.4 ===
Gary Mills and Sidney Thompson ported MINIX to Peripheral Technology PT68K-2 and PT68K-4 68000-based computers with a standard 8-bit IBM PC ISA bus that has 6 connectors on the main board, and it was adapted from the Atari one since it too is a 68000-based machine. It has added support for the PT XT-IDE card from Peripheral Technology, but it currently only supports the MDA display adapter (no CGA, EGA or VGA). For this reason, it has not yet been ported to the PT68K-5 (a.k.a. CDS68020). An SD Card image is available from https://github.com/mevenson/minix-for-the-PT68K-2-4.

=== MINIX 1.5 ===
Released in 1991, included support for MicroChannel IBM PS/2 systems, and it was also ported to the 68000 and SPARC architectures, supporting the Atari ST, Amiga, Macintosh, and Sun SPARCstation computer platforms. There were also unofficial ports to Intel 386 PC compatibles (in 32-bit protected mode), National Semiconductor NS32532, ARM and Inmos transputer processors. Meiko Scientific used an early version of MINIX as the basis for the MeikOS operating system for its transputer-based Computing Surface parallel computers.

=== MINIX 2.0 ===
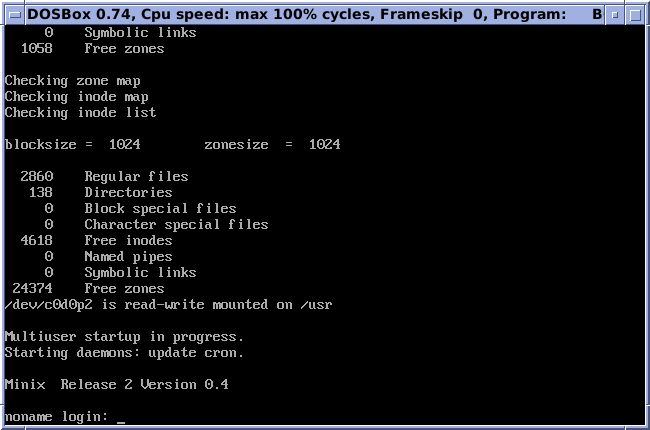
MINIX 2.0.4 system startup and login prompt

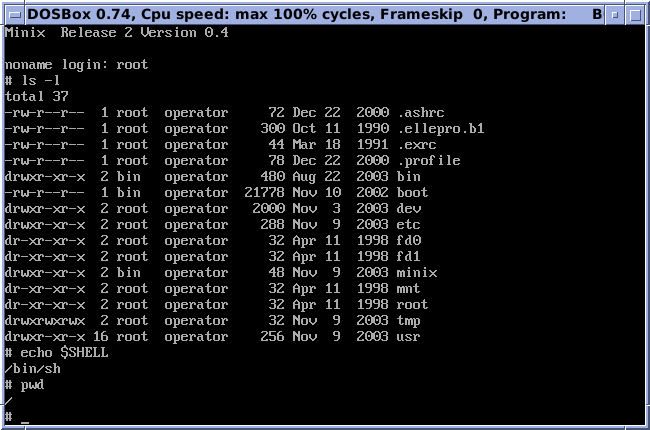
MINIX 2.0.4 shell interaction

Released in 1997, it was only available for the x86 and Solaris-hosted SPARC architectures and was distributed on a CD-ROM included in the second edition of Tanenbaum's textbook, cowritten with Albert S. Woodhull. It added compliance and support for 386 and later processors in 32-bit mode, and replaced the Amoeba network protocols included in MINIX 1.5 with a TCP/IP stack. A version of MINIX running as a user process under SunOS and Solaris was also available, a simulator named SMX (operating system) or just SMX for short.

Version 2.0.3 was released in May 2001, after MINIX had been relicensed under the BSD-3-Clause license, which was retroactively applied to all previous versions.

==== Minix-vmd ====
Minix-vmd is a variant of MINIX 2.0 for Intel IA-32-compatible processors, created by two Vrije Universiteit researchers, which adds virtual memory and support for the X Window System.

=== MINIX 3 ===
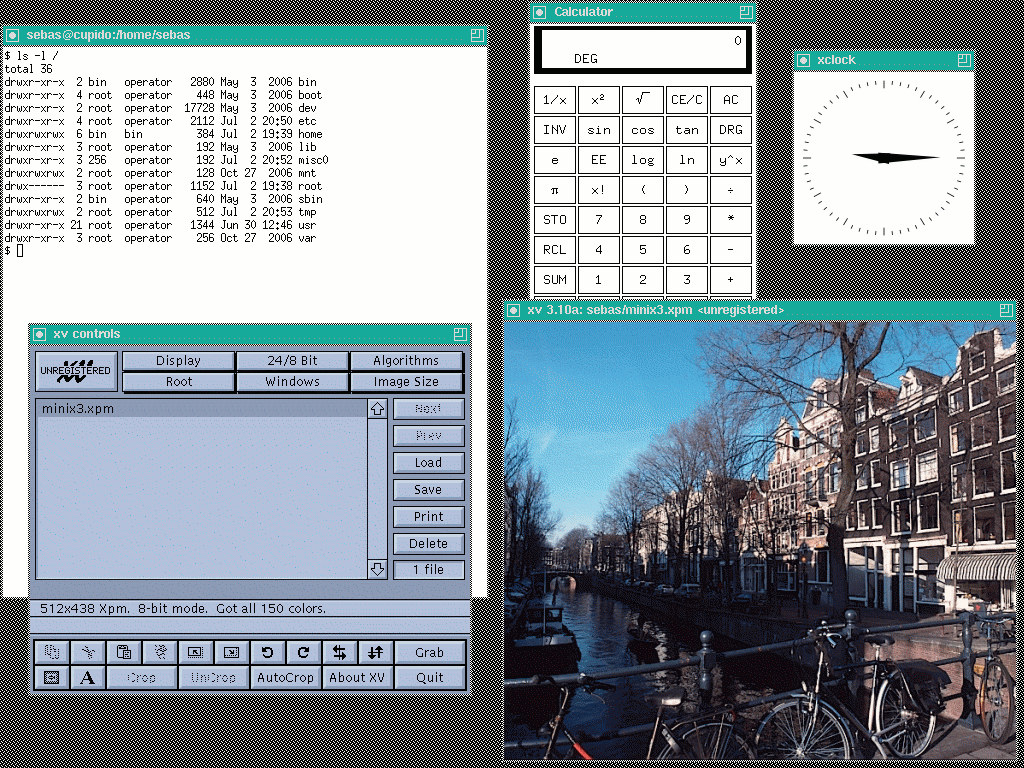
MINIX 3 running X11 with the twm window manager

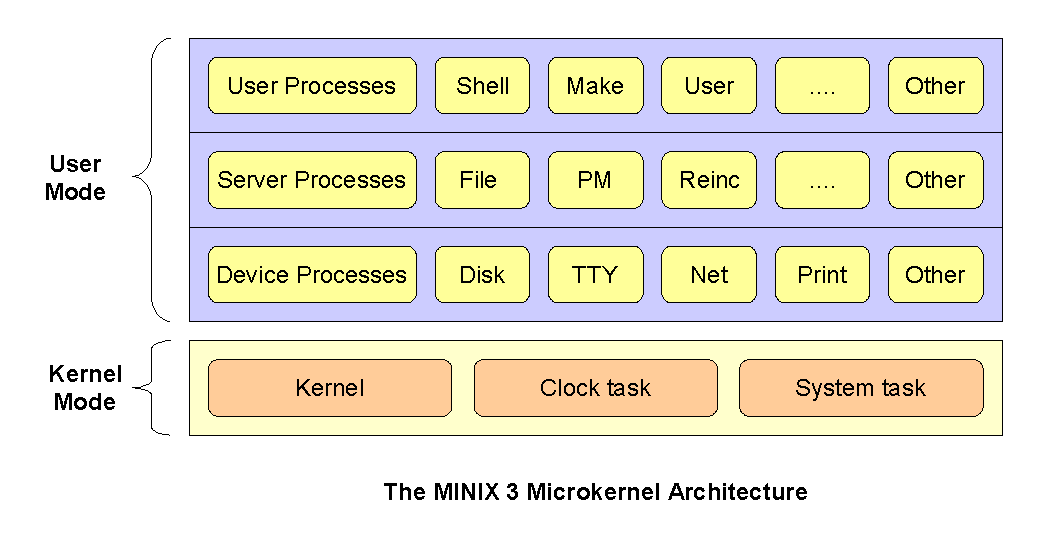
Architecture of MINIX 3

MINIX 3 was publicly announced on 24 October 2005 by Tanenbaum during his keynote speech at the Association for Computing Machinery (ACM) Symposium on Operating Systems Principles (SOSP). Although it still serves as an example for the third edition of his textbook, coauthored by Albert S. Woodhull, it is comprehensively redesigned to be "usable as a serious system on resource-limited and embedded computers and for applications requiring high reliability."

It currently supports IA-32 and ARM architecture systems and is available in a live CD format that allows it to be used on a computer without installing it on the hard drive. It is compatible with emulators such as Bochs, QEMU, VMware Workstation and Fusion, VirtualBox, and Microsoft Virtual PC.

Version 3.1.2 was released on 18 April 2006, after MINIX had been relicensed under the BSD-3-Clause license with a new fourth clause.

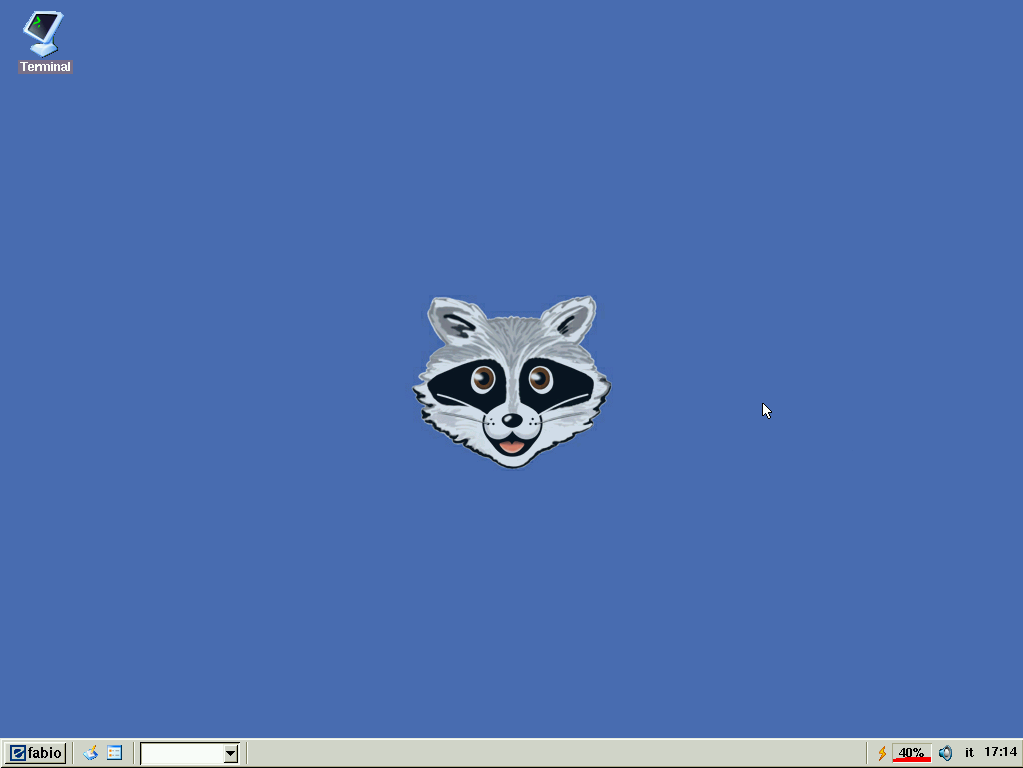
MINIX 3.1.7 running X11 with the EDE

Version 3.1.5 was released on 5 November 2009, and it contains X11, emacs, vi, cc, gcc, perl, python, ash, bash, zsh, ftp, ssh, telnet, pine, and over 400 other common Unix utility programs. With the addition of X11, this version marks the transition away from a text-only system. In many cases it can automatically restart a crashed driver without affecting running processes. In this way, MINIX is self-healing and can be used in applications demanding high reliability. Since version 3.1.4, support for virtual memory management has been added, making it suitable for desktop OS use. Desktop applications such as Firefox and OpenOffice.org are not yet available for MINIX 3, however.

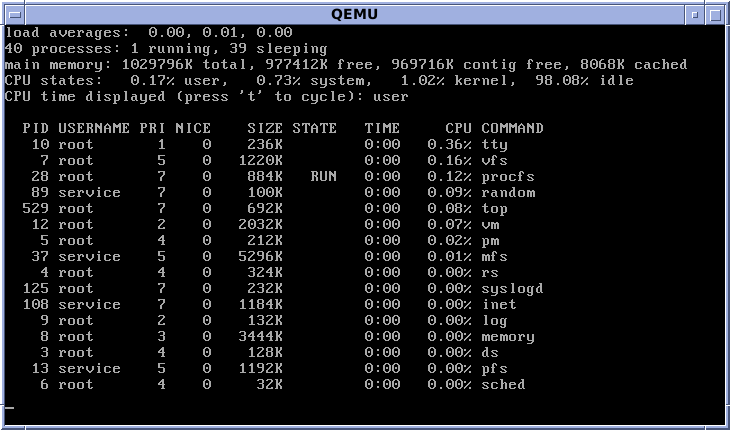
MINIX 3.2 running the "top" system monitoring command

As of version 3.2.0, the userland was mostly replaced by that of NetBSD and support from pkgsrc became possible, increasing the available software applications that MINIX can use. Clang replaced the prior compiler (with GCC now having to be manually compiled), and GDB, the GNU Debugger, was ported.

MINIX 3.3.0, released in September 2014, brought ARM support.

MINIX 3.4.0RC, Release Candidates became available in January 2016. However, a stable release of MINIX 3.4.0 is yet to be announced, and MINIX development has been dormant since 2018.

MINIX 3 supports many programming languages, including C, C++, FORTRAN, Modula-2, Pascal, Perl, Python, and Tcl.

Over 50 people attended MINIXCon 2016, a conference to discuss the history and future of MINIX.

All Intel chipsets post-2015 are running MINIX 3 internally as the software component of the Intel Management Engine.

== Relationship with Linux ==
=== Early influence ===
Linus Torvalds used and appreciated MINIX, but his design deviated from the MINIX architecture in significant ways, most notably by employing a monolithic kernel instead of a microkernel. This was disapproved of by Tanenbaum in the Tanenbaum–Torvalds debate. Tanenbaum explained again his rationale for using a microkernel in May 2006.

Early Linux kernel development was done on a MINIX host system, which led to Linux inheriting various features from MINIX, such as the MINIX file system. Eric Raymond claimed that Torvalds hadn't actually written Linux from scratch, but rather reused source code of MINIX itself to have working code base. As the development progressed, MINIX code was gradually phased out completely.

=== Samizdat claims ===
In his 2004 book, Samizdat, Kenneth Brown of AdTI claimed that much of the Linux kernel was copied from MINIX. These accusations were rebutted universally—most prominently by Tanenbaum, who strongly criticised Brown and published a long rebuttal on his own personal website, also pointing out that Brown was funded by Microsoft.

== Licensing ==
At the time of MINIX's original development, its license was relatively liberal. Its licensing fee was very small ($69) relative to those of other operating systems. Tanenbaum wished for MINIX to be as accessible as possible to students, but his publisher was unwilling to offer material (such as the source code) that could be copied freely, so a restrictive license requiring a nominal fee (included in the price of Tanenbaum's book) was applied as a compromise. This prevented the use of MINIX as the basis for a freely distributed software system.

When free and open-source Unix-like operating systems such as Linux and 386BSD became available in the early 1990s, many volunteer software developers abandoned MINIX in favor of these. In April 2000, MINIX became free and open-source software under the BSD-3-Clause license, which was retroactively applied to all previous versions. However, by this time other operating systems had surpassed its capabilities, and it remained primarily an operating system for students and hobbyists. In late 2005, MINIX was relicensed with a fourth clause added to the BSD-3-Clause license.

== Compared to other teaching operating systems ==
System	Lines of code	Kernel type	Language	Hardware environment	Lacks (vs others)
Minix 1	~12k	Microkernel	C	x86-16, 68000 family	?
Minix 2	~23k	Microkernel	C	x86-32	?
Minix 3	~100k+	Microkernel	C	x86-32	—N/a
Nachos	~15k	No kernel. User-space OS simulator	C++	MIPS simulator	SMP, paging, real hardware
Pintos	~25k	Monolithic	C	x86 (typically under QEMU/Bochs)	SMP, user-space drivers
Xinu	~10k	Monolithic	C	x86 / ARM	SMP, paging, virtual memory
xv6	~10k	Monolithic	C	x86 / x86-64 / RISC-V	user-space drivers, POSIX layer

== See also ==
- Redox, an operating system in Rust using a MINIX-like kernel
