= Operating Systems: Design and Implementation =

Computer science textbook

- Author: Andrew S. Tanenbaum, Albert S. Woodhull
- Language: English
- Published: 2006, 1997, 1987 (Pearson Education)
- Media type: Print
- Pages: 1054
- ISBN: 0-13-142938-8

Operating Systems: Design and Implementation is a computer science textbook written by Andrew S. Tanenbaum, with help from Albert S. Woodhull, published by Prentice Hall in 1987. The book describes the principles of operating systems and demonstrates their application in the source code of Tanenbaum's MINIX, a free Unix-like operating system designed for teaching purposes. The source code for MINIX was included as part of the original 719 pages of text. Later versions of the three editions also included loadable disks with MINIX:

- 1987 ed. MINIX 1.0
- 1997 ed. MINIX 2.0
- 2006 ed. MINIX 3.1.0

== See also ==
- History of Linux
- Tanenbaum–Torvalds debate
