= Andrew S. Tanenbaum =

American-Dutch computer scientist (born 1944)

Andy Tanenbaum
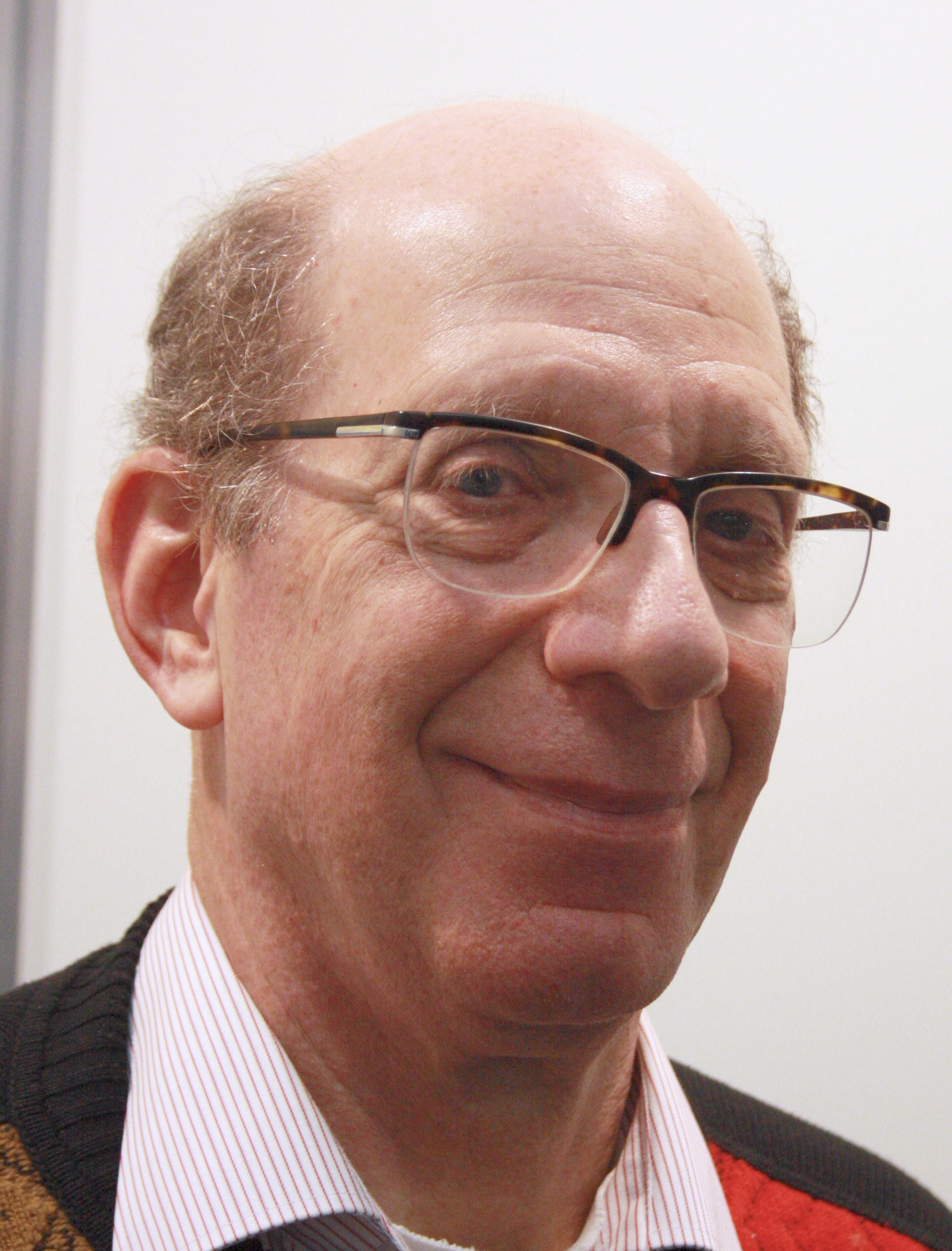
- Tanenbaum in 2012
- Born: Andrew Stuart Tanenbaum; March 16, 1944 (age 82); New York City, New York, U.S.
- Education: Massachusetts Institute of Technology (BS); University of California, Berkeley (PhD)
- Known for: MINIX; Microkernels; Electoral-vote.com
- Scientific career
- Fields: Distributed computing Operating systems
- Thesis: A Study of the Five Minute Oscillations, Supergranulation, and Related Phenomena in the Solar Atmosphere (1971)
- Doctoral advisor: John M. Wilcox
- Doctoral students: Henri Bal; Frans Kaashoek; Werner Vogels
- Website: cs.vu.nl/~ast pearsonhighered.com/tanenbaum

Andrew Stuart Tanenbaum (born March 16, 1944), sometimes referred to by the handle AST, is an American-born Dutch computer scientist and retired professor emeritus of computer science at the Vrije Universiteit Amsterdam in the Netherlands.

He is the author of MINIX, a free Unix-like operating system for teaching purposes, and has written multiple computer science textbooks regarded as standard texts in the field. He regards his teaching job as his most important work. Since 2004 he has operated Electoral-vote.com, a website dedicated to analysis of polling data in federal elections in the United States.

== Biography ==
Tanenbaum was born in New York City on March 16, 1944, and grew up in suburban White Plains, New York, where he attended the White Plains High School. His paternal grandfather was born in Khorostkiv in the Austro-Hungarian Empire.

He received his Bachelor of Science degree in physics from MIT in 1965 and his Doctor of Philosophy degree in astrophysics from the University of California, Berkeley in 1971.

As an undergraduate, he had obtained experience at computer programming, which helped him get a summer internship at the National Radio Astronomy Observatory in West Virginia. After receiving his doctorate, he decided that he was more interested in programming. He became an assistant professor in Amsterdam based in part on his expertise in programming the university's new computer. He taught courses on Computer Organization and Operating Systems and supervised the work of PhD candidates at the VU University Amsterdam. On July 9, 2014, he announced his retirement. He is married to his Dutch wife, but retains his American citizenship.

== Teaching ==
=== Books ===
Tanenbaum's textbooks on computer science include:

- Structured computer organization. Upper Saddle River, NJ: Pearson Prentice Hall. 1976. ISBN 978-0-13-148521-1.
- Computer networks. Upper Saddle River, NJ: Pearson Prentice Hall. 2019. ISBN 978-0-13-540800-1. (1981, with David J. Wetherall and Nickolas Feamster)
- Operating Systems: Design and Implementation, co-authored with Albert Woodhull
- Modern Operating Systems (1992, 2001, 2007, 2014, 2022)
- Distributed operating systems. Englewood Cliffs, N.J: Prentice Hall. 1995. ISBN 978-0-13-219908-7.
- Distributed systems: principles and paradigms. Upper Saddle River, NJ: Pearson Prentice Hall. 2007. ISBN 978-0-13-239227-3. (with Maarten van Steen)

One of Tanenbaum's most influential textbooks is Structured Computer Organization, first published in 1976. In the preface to the first edition, he famously began with the words: "Once upon a time computers were very simple." His book, Operating Systems: Design and Implementation and MINIX were Linus Torvalds' inspiration for the Linux kernel. In his autobiography Just for Fun, Torvalds describes it as "the book that launched me to new heights".

=== Doctoral students ===
Tanenbaum has had a number of PhD students who themselves have gone on to become widely known computer science researchers. These include:

- Henri Bal, professor at the Vrije Universiteit in Amsterdam
- Frans Kaashoek, professor at MIT
- Werner Vogels, Chief Technology Officer at Amazon.com

=== Dean of the Advanced School for Computing and Imaging ===
In the early 1990s, the Dutch government began setting up a number of thematically oriented research schools that spanned multiple universities. These schools were intended to bring professors and PhD students from different Dutch (and later, foreign) universities together to help them cooperate and enhance their research.

Tanenbaum was one of the cofounders and first Dean of the Advanced School for Computing and Imaging (ASCI). This school initially consisted of nearly 200 faculty members and PhD students from the Vrije Universiteit, University of Amsterdam, Delft University of Technology, and Leiden University. They were especially working on problems in advanced computer systems such as parallel computing and image analysis and processing.

Tanenbaum remained dean for 12 years, until 2005, when he was awarded an Academy Professorship by the Royal Netherlands Academy of Arts and Sciences, at which time he became a full-time research professor.

== Projects ==
=== Amsterdam Compiler Kit ===
The Amsterdam Compiler Kit is a toolkit for producing portable compilers. It was started sometime before 1981 and Andrew Tanenbaum was the architect from the start until version 5.5.

=== Amoeba ===
Tanenbaum directed a group at the Vrije Universiteit Amsterdam doing research on distributed computer systems, which, in cooperation with the Centrum Wiskunde & Informatica, produced the distributed operating system Amoeba.

=== MINIX ===
In 1987, Tanenbaum wrote a clone of UNIX, called MINIX (MINi-unIX), for the IBM PC. It was targeted at students and others who wanted to learn how an operating system worked. Consequently, he wrote a book that listed the source code in an appendix and described it in detail in the text. The source code itself was available on a set of floppy disks. Within three months, a Usenet newsgroup, comp.os.minix, had sprung up with over 40,000 subscribers discussing and improving the system. One of these subscribers was Linus Torvalds, who began adding new features to MINIX and tailoring it to his own needs. On October 5, 1991, Torvalds announced his own (POSIX-like) kernel, called Linux, which originally used the MINIX file system but is not based on MINIX code.

=== Electoral-vote.com ===
In 2004, Tanenbaum created Electoral-vote.com, a web site analyzing opinion polls for the 2004 U.S. presidential election, using them to project the outcome in the Electoral College. He stated that he created the site as an American who "knows first hand what the world thinks of America and it is not a pretty picture at the moment. I want people to think of America as the land of freedom and democracy, not the land of arrogance and blind revenge. I want to be proud of America again." The site provided a color-coded map, updated each day with projections for each state's electoral votes. Through most of the campaign period Tanenbaum kept his identity secret, referring to himself as "the Votemaster" and acknowledging only that he personally preferred John Kerry. Mentioning that he supported the Democrats, he revealed his identity on November 1, 2004, the day before the election, and also stating his reasons and qualifications for running the website.

Through the site he also covered the 2006 midterm elections, correctly predicting the winner of all 33 Senate races that year.

For the 2008 elections, he got every state right except for Indiana, which he said McCain would win by 2% (Obama won by 1%) and Missouri, which he said was too close to call (McCain won by 0.1%). He correctly predicted all the winners in the Senate except for Minnesota, where he predicted a 1% win by Norm Coleman over Al Franken. After 7 months of legal battling and recounts, Franken won by 312 votes (0.01%).

In 2010, he correctly projected 35 out of 37 Senate races in the Midterm elections on the website. The exceptions were Colorado and Nevada.

Electoral-vote.com incorrectly predicted Hillary Clinton would win the 2016 United States presidential election. The website incorrectly predicted Clinton would win Wisconsin, Michigan, Pennsylvania, North Carolina, and Florida. Electoral-vote.com did not predict a winner for Nevada, which Clinton would win. The website predicted the winners of the remaining 44 states and the District of Columbia correctly. Clinton however, won the popular vote, but lost the electoral vote.

== Tanenbaum–Torvalds debate ==
The Tanenbaum–Torvalds debate was a debate between Tanenbaum and Linus Torvalds regarding kernel design on Usenet in 1992.

== Awards ==
- Fellow of the ACM
- Fellow of the IEEE for outstanding contributions to research and education in computer networks and operating systems.
- Member of the Royal Netherlands Academy of Arts and Sciences
- ACM Software System Award, 2023
- IEEE TCDP Outstanding Technical Achievement Award, 2022
- ACM EUROSYS Lifetime Achievement Award, 2015
- Winner of the TAA McGuffey award for classic textbooks for Modern Operating Systems, 3rd ed., 2010
- USENIX Flame Award for Lifetime Achievement, 2008
- NLUUG Lifetime Achievement Award, 2008
- Winner of the IEEE James H. Mulligan, Jr. Education Medal, 2007
- TAA Texty Award winner, 2003
- ACM Karl V. Karlstrom Educator of the Year Award, 1994

=== Honorary doctorates ===
Tanenbaum in Târgu Mureș

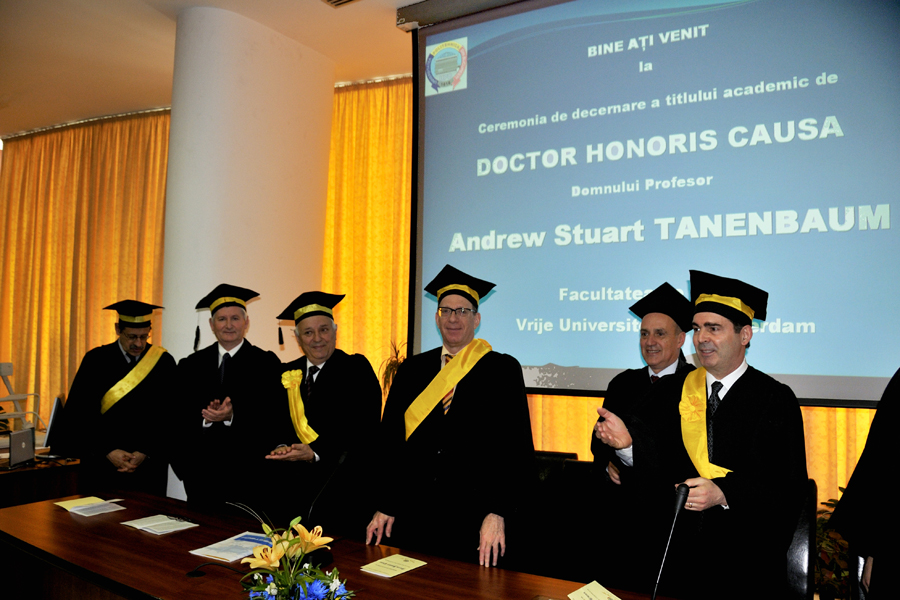
Tanenbaum is 4th from left

- On May 12, 2008, Tanenbaum received an honorary doctorate from Universitatea Politehnica din București.
- On October 7, 2011, Universitatea Petru Maior din Târgu Mureș (Petru Maior University of Târgu Mureș) granted Tanenbaum the Doctor Honoris Causa (honorary doctorate) title for his work in the field of computer science and achievements in education.
