= Cartopology =

Academic and artistic discipline

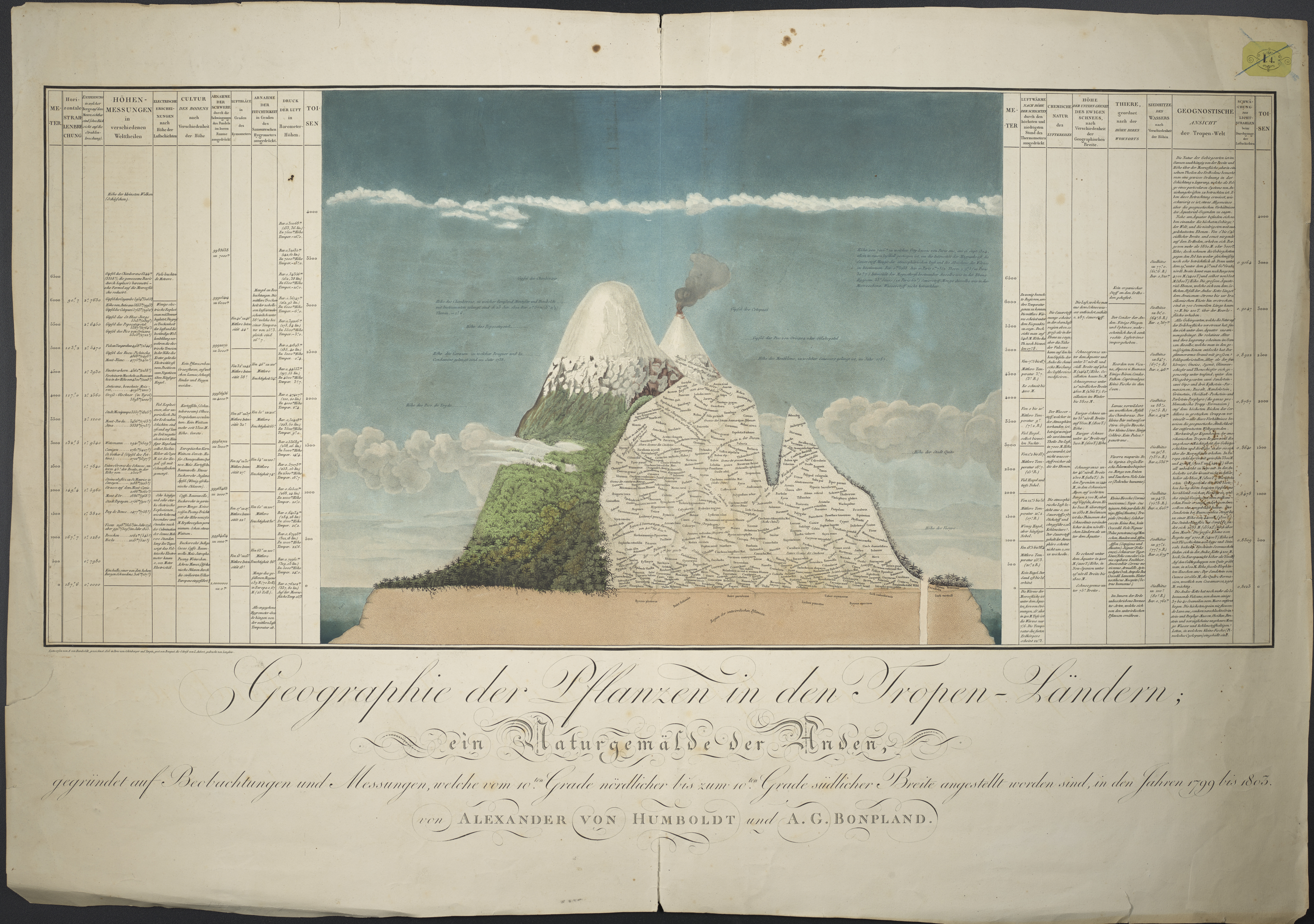
Famous map from Alexander Von Humboldt, depicting spatial characteristic in an artistic and scientific manner

Cartopology is an academic and artistic discipline that aims to combine anthropological methods with cartographic ways to translate experiences and insights of architectural spaces into maps. The knowledge that these maps create is mainly used by policy makers in the field of regional development, city planning or cross-border cooperation. Occasionally, cartopological maps are displayed in art exhibitions about design or spatial planning.

== Theoretical background ==
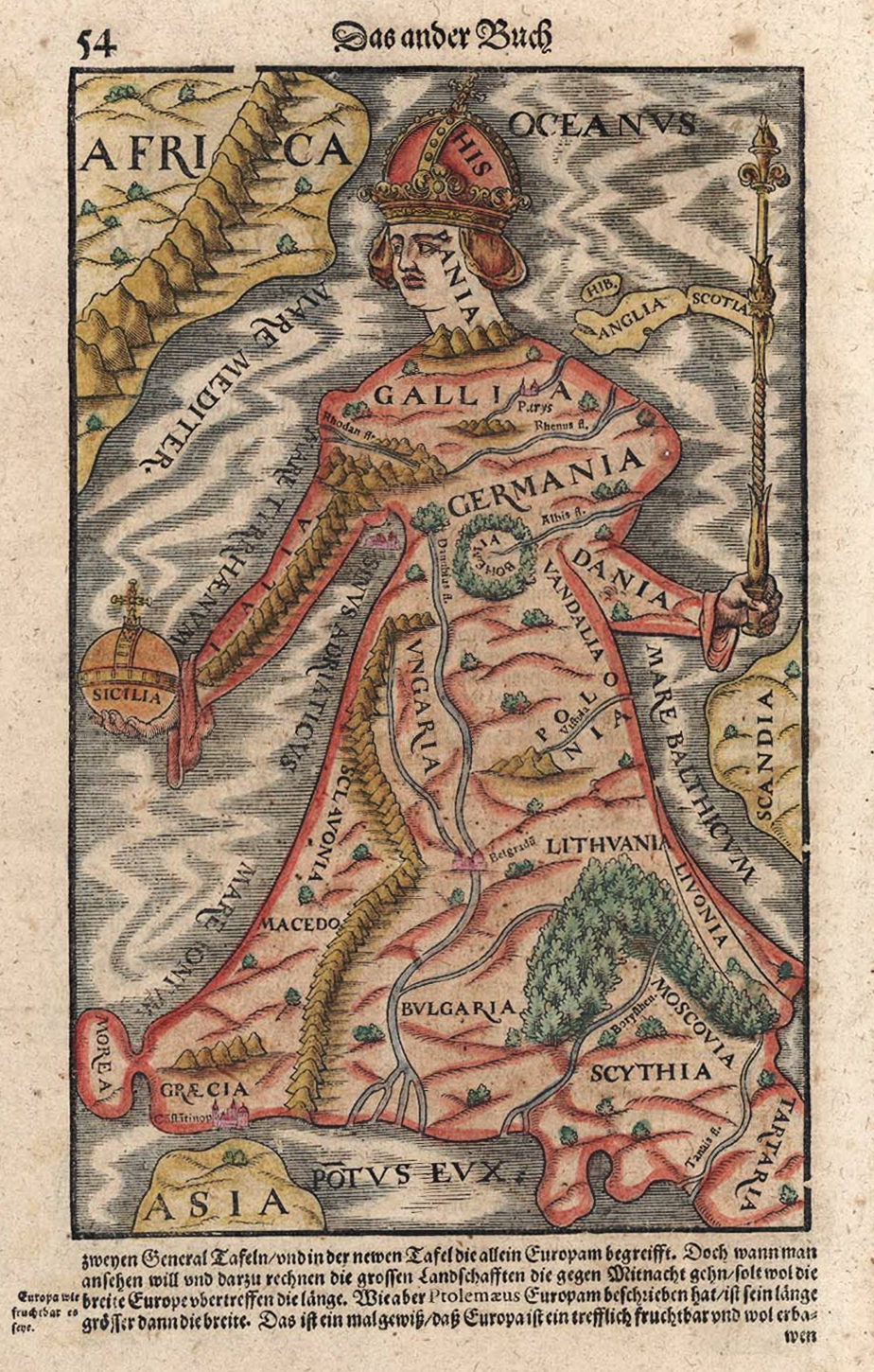
Example of how geographical maps were "decorated" with politically and culturally informed drawings

The term 'cartopology' was first coined by Dear Hunter and the 'Institute of Cartopology' around 2018. However, the actual practice of doing cartopological research is known to be done in the sixteenth century. Early modern cartographers drew all kinds of scenes on the maps that displayed their own cultural or geographical background and political position. Arguably, Alexander von Humboldt is the last explorer that worked with cartopology to study and express his findings. According to the German historian Karl Schlögel, “Alexander von Humboldt is a late embodiment of a knowledge that unites much that would soon grow apart: disciplines such as mineralogy, geography, ethnology, linguistics, botany, zoology, and history; genres such as statistics, geodesy, the registration and recording of all he found in a land, the dense description of situation, and the historical study; and forms of organization - he was a scientist as well as an entrepreneur and manager of science.” Von Humboldt used his drawing skills and his scientific intellect to create a multi-layered piece of information that could not be retrieved from a merely written scientific paper or factual map of the kind we know today. "Humboldt's major scientific contribution was realizing the interconnectedness of climate, geography, nature, and human societies. (...) By creating visualizations of data that had previously been bound up in tables, Humboldt revealed connections that had eluded others." This new understanding of the world should not be seen as a linear piece of information, but rather as a circular and interconnected story. Most current day cartographers however, aim to represent the world in a mere linear, physical manner. More intimate information based on experiences of the place are therefore left out of the map. In cartopology, this anthropological and ethnographic information is central to the map making process. In this sense, cartopology in the 21st century use of the term, strongly builds on the work of Tim Ingold and Stefan Hirschauer. The former developed an idea around thinking through making. The latter explained how hidden knowledge can be discovered, transferred and modelled into space and time on maps effectively.

== Current use ==
=== Policy advice ===
'Hills with a history', 2019, Dear Hunter. An exemplary work of cartopologic research.

Cartopological research is often carried out at the request of local governments or policy makers who are interested in the way the space that they designed is actually being used. The most important benefit of this type of research, is the fact that it relates directly to the space the policy maker or designer is interested in. The geographical way of working assures the client that the outcome of the research is recognizable and relatable - and therefore instrumental in future design questions. Each problem or noteworthy characteristic of the place will get a concrete place on the map. This map is both the outcome of the research assignment, as well as a detailed report of the process of the research.

=== Exhibitions ===
There have been several exhibitions that displayed cartopological work. These exhibitions mainly focused on local design identities or map making as an art form. As an artistic expression, cartopology adds a locality to the design process in the form of storytelling. This is traditionally absent in spatial planning. But it also functions the other way around: in a storytelling process, the location of the story is, in the cartopological sense, often neglected. The cartopologist aims to give the space in which something takes place the credit it deserves.

=== Education ===
A specific educational course has been developed called 'Doing Cartopology' which aims to teach students of architecture, anthropology and various art disciplines to become familiar with the benefits of the cartopological method. This course has been taught at various universities and art academies, such as the RWTH in Aachen, Zuyd Hogeschool in Maastricht and KU Leuven.

== See also ==
- Psychogeography
