= The Magic Flute (disambiguation) =

The Magic Flute (1791) is an opera by Wolfgang Amadeus Mozart. Other notable works with this title include:

== Ballet ==
- The Magic Flute (ballet) (1893) by Lev Ivanov to music by Riccardo Drigo

== Film ==
- The Magic Flute (1975), Swedish: Trollflöjten, by Ingmar Bergman
- The Smurfs and the Magic Flute (1976), Belgian animated film
- The Magic Flute (2006) a film by Kenneth Branagh
- Magic Flute Diaries (2008), a film by Kevin Sullivan
- The Magic Flute (2022), a film by Florian Sigl

== Literature ==
- Krishnavatara (The Magic Flute), the first of a series of novels based on the Indian epic Mahabharata and the life of Krishna by K. M. Munshi

== Musicals ==
- The Magic Flute (musical) (2007)

== Opera ==
- The Magic Flute's Second Part (Der Zauberflöte zweyter Theil. Das Labyrinth oder Der Kampf mit den Elementen), 1798 heroic-comic opera by Emanuel Schikaneder, with music by Peter von Winter

== See also ==
- 14877 Zauberflöte, main belt asteroid
- Die Zauberflöte. Oper und Mysterium, a 2005 book by Jan Assmann
