= Aleida Assmann =

German professor of English and Literary Studies

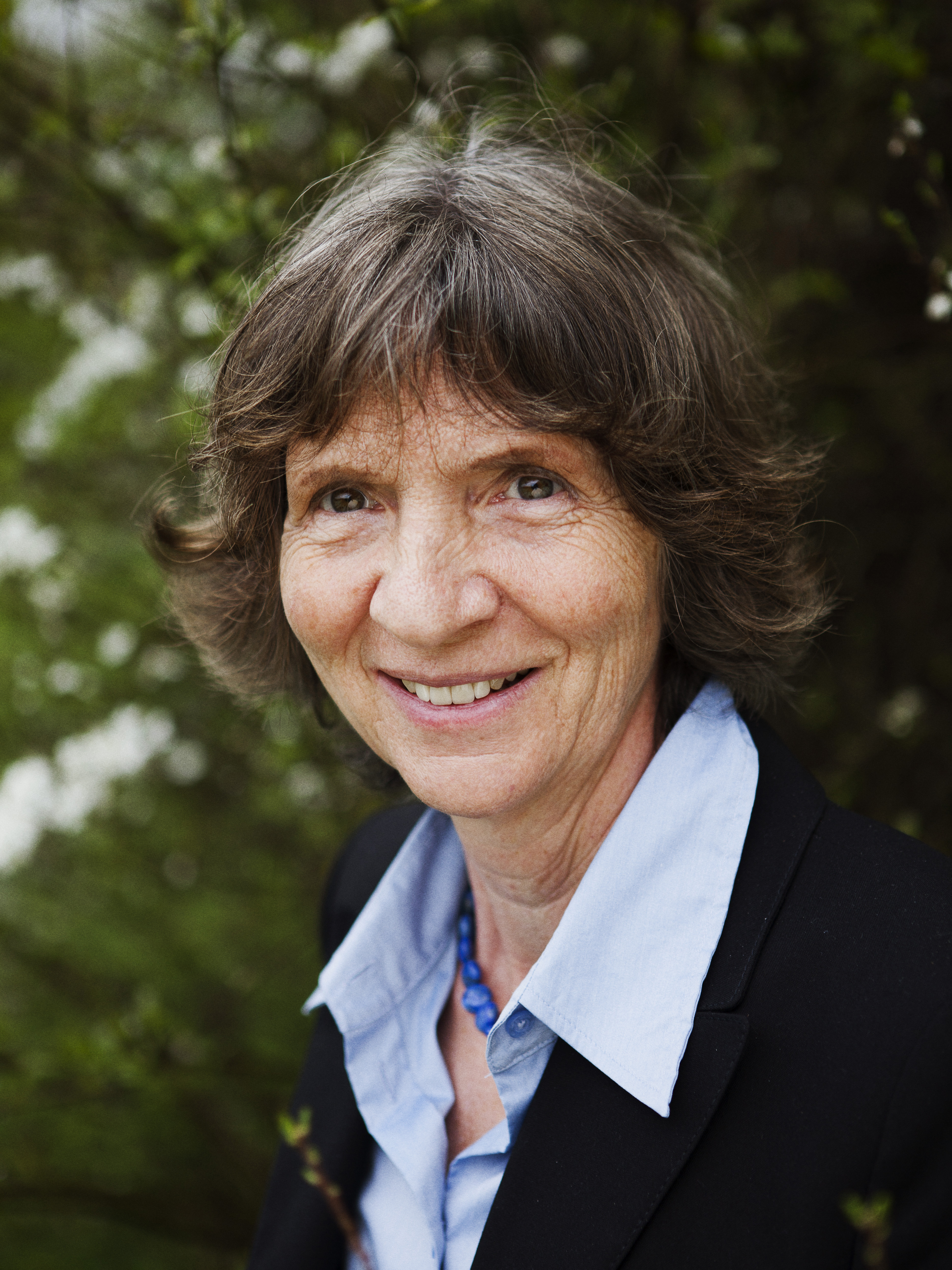
- Born: Aleida Bornkamm; 22 March 1947 (age 79); Bethel, Germany
- Spouse: Jan Assmann
- Children: 5
- Parent: Günther Bornkamm
- Awards: Heineken Prize; Balzan Prize; Friedenspreis des Deutschen Buchhandels

Academic background
- Education: University of Heidelberg; University of Tübingen

Academic work
- Discipline: English studies; Literary studies
- Institutions: University of Konstanz; Princeton University
- Website: www.netzwerk-kulturwissenschaft.de/assmann.htm

Notes
- Aleida Assmann's voice Recorded November 2018

Aleida Assmann (born Aleida Bornkamm, 22 March 1947) is a German professor of English and literary studies, who studied Egyptology and whose work has focused on cultural anthropology and cultural and communicative memory.

== Life ==
Born Aleida Bornkamm in Bethel, North Rhine-Westphalia, Germany, she is the daughter of the New Testament scholar Günther Bornkamm and his wife, Elisabeth. She studied English and Egyptology at the universities of Heidelberg and Tübingen from 1966 to 1972. In 1977 she wrote her dissertation in Heidelberg about The Legitimacy of Fiction (Die Legitimation der Fiktion). She had to take her minor field examination in Egyptology in Tübingen because her husband Jan Assmann had become a professor of Egyptology in Heidelberg.

In 1992 Assmann completed her habilitation in Heidelberg. In 1993 she became a professor of English and Literary Studies at the University of Konstanz, where she remained to 2014. She was a visiting professor at Rice University in Houston (2000), at Princeton University in 2001, at Yale University in 2002, 2003 and 2005, and at the University of Vienna in 2005. She was visiting professor at the University of Chicago in 2007.

Assmann's early works were about English Literature and the history of literary communication. Since the 1990s her focus has been on cultural anthropology, especially Cultural and Communicative Memory, terms she and her husband coined and developed. Her specific interests is focused on the history of German memory since 1945, the role of generations in literature and society, and theories of memory.

Since 2011 she has been working on a research project titled The Past in the Present: Dimensions and Dynamics of Cultural Memory. This project summarizes in English her and Jan Assmann's work on cultural memory.

== Awards ==
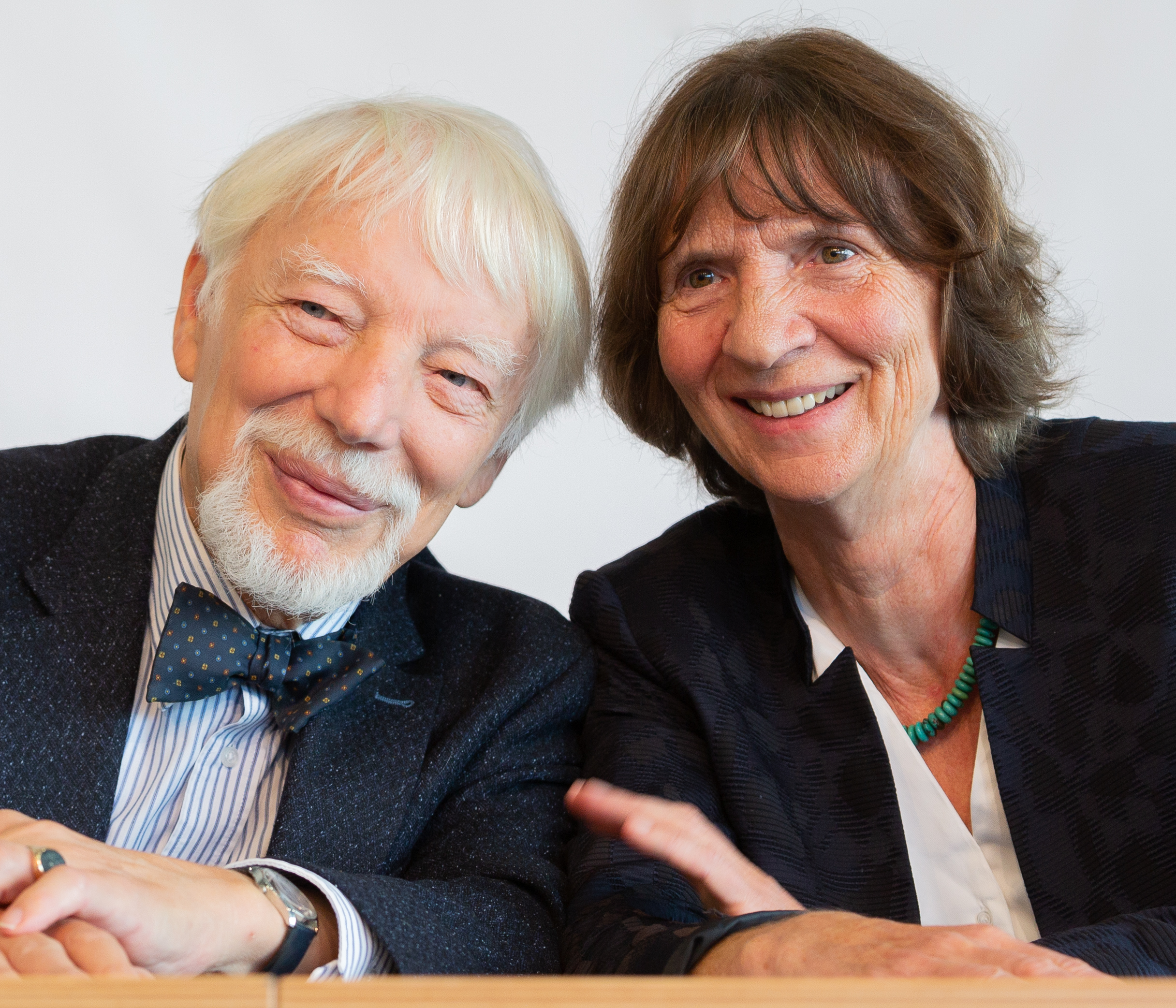
Jan and Aleida Assmann at a press conference at the 2018 Frankfurt Book Fair

In 2014, she received the Heineken Prize for history from the Royal Netherlands Academy of Arts and Sciences. In 2017, she was awarded the Balzan Prize for Collective Memory together with her husband Jan Assmann. In 2018, she was awarded the Friedenspreis des Deutschen Buchhandels together with her husband, honouring their work "sustainable peace and understanding among the peoples of the world". In 2019, she was awarded the Erasmus Medal of the Academia Europaea. Since 2020, Assmann has been member of the order Pour le Mérite for Sciences and Arts, together with her husband. In 2021 she was elected a corresponding fellow of the British Academy.

=== Honorary doctorates ===
- 2008 University of Oslo

== Bibliography ==
- Die Legitimität der Fiktion. Ein Beitrag zur Geschichte der literarischen Kommunikation. Theorie und Geschichte der Literatur und der schönen Künste; 55. Munich: Fink. 1980.
- Arbeit am nationalen Gedächtnis. Eine kurze Geschichte der deutschen Bildungsidee. Frankfurt: Campus. 1993.
- Zeit und Tradition. Kulturelle Strategien der Dauer. (Beiträge zur Geschichtskultur vol. 15)(Cologne, Weimar, Vienna: Böhlau, 1999)
- Geschichtsvergessenheit - Geschichtsversessenheit: Vom Umgang mit deutschen Vergangenheiten nach 1945. (Stuttgart: Deutsche Verlags-Anstalt, 1999) (with Ute Frevert)
- Erinnerungsräume: Formen und Wandlungen des kulturellen Gedächtnisses. (Munich: C.H. Beck, 1999).
- Engführung des kulturellen Gedächtnisses: Die Germanistik in Deutschland steht im Banne eines post-traumatischen Literaturkanons in: Frankfurter Rundschau (23 April 2002)
- Das kulturelle Gedächtnis an der Millenniumsschwelle. Krise und Zukunft der Bildung, (Constance: UVK, 2004)
- Die Unverzichtbarkeit der Kulturwissenschaften mit einem nachfolgenden Briefwechsel. (Hildesheimer Universitätsreden. Neue Folge Heft 2) (Hildesheim: Universitätsverlag, 2004)
- Generationsidentitäten und Vorurteilsstrukturen in der neuen deutschen Erinnerungsliteratur (Wiener Vorlesungen im Rathaus, vol. 117, ed. by Hubert Christian Ehalt) (Vienna: Picus, 2006)
- Einführung in die Kulturwissenschaft. Grundbegriffe, Themen, Fragestellungen (Berlin: Erich Schmidt, 2006)
- Der lange Schatten der Vergangenheit. Erinnerungskultur und Geschichtspolitik. (Munich: C.H. Beck, 2006)
- "Memory, Individual and Collective", in: Robert E. Goodin and Charles Tilly (eds.): The Oxford Handbook of Contextual Political Analysis (Oxford: OUP, 2006), pp. 210–224
- Geschichte im Gedächtnis: Von der individuellen Erfahrung zur öffentlichen Inszenierung. (Munich: C.H. Beck, 2007).
- "Europe : a community of memory? Twentieth Annual Lecture of the GHI, November 16, 2006". Bulletin of the German Historical Institute. 40: 11–25. Spring 2007.
  - Novick, Peter (Spring 2007). "Comments on Aleida Assmann's lecture : comment delivered at the Twentieth Annual Lecture of the GHI, November 16, 2006". Bulletin of the German Historical Institute. 40: 26–31.
  - "Response to Peter Novick". Bulletin of the German Historical Institute. 40: 33–38. Spring 2007.
- "Die Last der Vergangenheit," in: Zeithistorische Forschungen 3(2008), pp. 375–385
- "The Religious Roots of Cultural Memory," in: Norsk teologisk tidsskrift 4(2008), pp. 270–292
- "Vom Vergessen der Kunst. Grenzüberlegungen zur Kulturanthropologie. Im Gespräch mit Renate Solbach," in: Ulrich Schödlbauer (ed.), Die Enden der Kunst: Die Kultur der Gesellschaft (Heidelberg: Manutius, 2008), pp. 109–129
- "Sammeln, Sammlungen, Sammler," in: Kay Junge, Daniel Suber, and Gerold Gerber (eds.), Erleben, Erleiden, Erfahren: Die Konstitution sozialen Sinns jenseits instrumenteller Vernunft (Bielefeld: transcript, 2008), pp. 345–353
- "Von kollektiver Gewalt zu gemeinsamer Zukunft: Vier Modelle für den Umgang mit traumatischer Vergangenheit," in: Kerstin Lingen (ed.), Kriegserfahrung und nationale Identität in Europa nach 1945: Erinnerung, Säuberungsprozesse und nationales Gedächtnis (Paderborn: Schöningh, 2009), pp. 42–51

translated: "From Collective Violence to a Common Future: Four Models for Dealing with a Traumatic Past," in: Helen Gonçalves da Silva et al. (eds.), Conflict, Memory Transfers and the Reshaping of Europe (Newcastle upon Tyne: Cambridge Scholars Publishing, 2010), 8-23

- "Vom Zentrum zur Peripherie und zurück: Reisen ins Herz der Finsternis," in: Matthias Theodor Vogt (ed.), Peripherie in der Mitte Europas (Frankfurt: Lang, 2009), pp. 61–77
- ed.: Vollkommenheit (Archäologie der literarischen Kommunikation 10) (Munich: Fink, 2010)
- "Vergessen oder Erinnern? Wege aus einer gemeinsamen Gewaltgeschichte," in: Sabina Ferhadbegovic and Brigitte Weiffen (eds.), Bürgerkriege erzählen: Zum Verlauf unziviler Konflikte (Constance: Konstanz University Press, 2011), pp. 303–320
- "Wem gehört die Geschichte? Fakten und Fiktionen in der neueren deutschen Erinnerungsliteratur," in: Internationales Archiv für Sozialgeschichte der deutschen Literatur 36:1 (2011), pp. 213–225
- Die Zukunft der Erinnerung und der Holocaust (with Geoffrey Hartman) (Constance: Konstanz University Press 2012)
- Auf dem Weg zu einer europäischen Gedächtniskultur? with a preface by Hubert Christian Ehalt (Wiener Vorlesungen im Rathaus vol. 161) (Vienna: Picus, 2012)
- Cultural Memory and Western Civilization: Functions, Media, Archives (Cambridge: Cambridge University Press, 2012)
