= Lester Bernstein =

American Journalist (1920-2014)

- Born: July 18, 1920; The Bronx, New York City
- Died: November 27, 2014 (aged 90); Lido Beach, New York
- Education: Columbia University (BA)
- Occupations: journalist, editor
- Spouse: Jacqueline Lipscomb
- Children: 4, including Nina Bernstein
- Relatives: Andreas Huyssen (son-in-law)

Lester Bernstein (July 18, 1920 – November 27, 2014) was an American journalist, newspaper executive, and the former editor-in-chief of Newsweek from 1979 to 1982.

== Biography ==
Bernstein was born in The Bronx on July 18, 1920, to Jewish parents Isidore Bernstein and Rebecca Axelrod, who were Yiddish-speaking immigrants from Eastern Europe. He graduated from DeWitt Clinton High School in 1936 and in 1940 from Columbia College, where he was The New York Times's campus correspondent and joined the staff after graduation, against his father's wishes.

On December 7, 1941, he was the first Times staff member to report the Japanese attack on Pearl Harbor. He was drafted into the United States Army in December 1942, and served in the 102nd Infantry Division, 9th Army in Europe where he worked as a radioman.

He gained a reputation for covering Broadway during the 1940s and joined Time in 1948 as a film critic and was posted to Rome and interviewed celebrities such as Roberto Rossellini, Vittorio De Sica, and Gina Lollobrigida. He was named Time's European correspondent in 1955, where he interviewed Carl Jung and profiled Billy Graham. In 1956, he returned to New York as the magazine's associate editor and profiled the wartime broadcaster Edward R. Murrow.

Bernstein than joined NBC and as vice president in 1960, worked with executives from CBS and the American Broadcasting Company to arrange America's first televised presidential debates between Senator John F. Kennedy and Vice President Richard Nixon.

In 1963, he joined Newsweek as national affairs editor and helped cover the assassination of John F. Kennedy, the Vietnam War, and the Civil rights movement. He also accompanied Senator Robert F. Kennedy to Los Angeles when he won the California primary of the Democratic presidential nomination and stayed at the Ambassador Hotel on the night RFK was assassinated in 1968.

He rose to managing editor of Newsweek, but left in 1972 after he felt that he was passed over for the job of top editor by the paper's publisher Katharine Graham. Instead, Osborn Elliott was promoted to the position. Bernstein joined RCA as vice president for corporate communications.

In 1979, he was summoned back by Newsweek to take charge of the newspaper after Graham fired Elliott's successor, Edward Kosner, after internal disagreements over the style, content, and direction of the magazine. Under his watch, the magazine won multiple honors, including two of the 11 National Magazine Awards in 1982: one for general excellence and the other for a single-topic issue titled "What Vietnam Did to Us."

In 1982, he was at the center of a controversy when he decided to publish William H. Bailey's "Portrait of S," a painting of a topless woman, to illustrate the magazine's cover story, which was immediately followed by a public backlash. Adding to the outcry was that the model was a niece of former Connecticut Senator Abraham Ribicoff who had been shot dead in a 1980 robbery after she exited a restaurant in Venice, California.

Bernstein was replaced by William Broyles Jr. as editor in chief of Newsweek in 1982. He continued to write book reviews and op-eds after retirement for The New York Times, including a 1989 cover story for The New York Times Magazine.

== Awards ==
In 1980, Bernstein received the John Jay Award, given out by Columbia College's alumni association for distinguished professional achievement, along with the pianist Emanuel Ax and U.S. Secretary of Defense Harold Brown.

== Personal life ==
During his military training in Texas, he met his future wife, Jacqueline Lipscomb, an artist who exhibited under the name Mimi Talbot, during a United Service Organizations dance; the couple married in 1946 and had four children. One of his daughters, Nina Bernstein, is a journalist for The New York Times and is married to the Columbia University professor Andreas Huyssen. Bernstein died on November 27, 2014, at his home in Lido Beach, New York at 94 years old. His wife predeceased him by eight days.
