= Anson Rabinbach =

American historian (1945–2025)

Anson G. Rabinbach
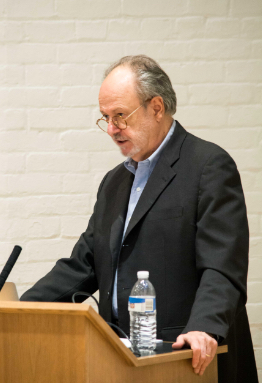
- Born: June 2, 1945; New York City, U.S.
- Died: February 2, 2025 (aged 79); Rome, Italy
- Occupations: Scholar, historian
- Title: Philip and Beulah Rollins Professor of History Emeritus at Princeton University
- Board member of: Co-editor, New German Critique

Academic background
- Education: Ph.D.
- Alma mater: University of Wisconsin–Madison

Academic work
- Discipline: Historian
- Sub-discipline: European Intellectual History
- Institutions: Princeton University
- Main interests: Germany, Austria, Fascism, Intellectual History, Critical Theory
- Notable works: The Human Motor: Energy, Fatigue, and the Origins of Modernity (1990)

Anson Gilbert Rabinbach (June 2, 1945 – February 2, 2025) was an American historian of modern Europe and the Philip and Beulah Rollins Professor of History at Princeton University. He is best known for his writings on labor, Nazi Germany, Austromarxism, and European thought in the nineteenth and twentieth centuries. In 1973 he co-founded the journal New German Critique, which he continued to co-edit.

== Early life ==
Rabinbach was born in the West Bronx, New York City, on June 2, 1945. His parents, Gabriel and Esther (Kleinman) Rabinbach, were Jewish immigrants from what is now southeastern Poland. Both were garment workers and members of the Communist Party. His father Gabriel was engaged in the German Revolution of 1918–19, briefly lived in Birobidzhan (the autonomous Jewish region of the Soviet Union), and upon immigrating to the United States was associated with the Yiddish-language Communist newspaper Morgen Freiheit.

Rabinbach received his B.A. from Hofstra University in 1967. He went on to earn an M.A. (1970) and Ph.D. (1973) from the University of Wisconsin–Madison under the supervision of the German-Jewish cultural historian George Mosse. Rabinbach wrote his M.A. thesis on the migration of Galician Jews in the Habsburg Monarchy. His doctoral dissertation was published in 1983 as The Crisis of Austrian Socialism: From Red Vienna to Civil War, 1927–1934.

== Career and works ==
Rabinbach first taught at Hampshire College in Amherst, Massachusetts, as an assistant professor from 1973 to 1978. From 1980 to 1984 he was a lecturer in the Department of History at Princeton University. From 1984 to 1995 he taught at the Cooper Union for the Advancement of Science and Art in New York City, where he was Professor of History and twice served as Acting Dean of Humanities and Social Sciences. In 1996 he returned to Princeton as the Philip and Beulah Rollins Professor of History, a chair he held until his retirement in 2019.

Rabinbach spent significant time in Austria researching the history of Austromarxism and Red Vienna. His first book, The Crisis of Austrian Socialism: From Red Vienna to Civil War, 1927–1934, charted the rise to power of the Social Democratic Workers' Party of Austria under Otto Bauer, its remarkable success in creating "socialism in one city" by radically reforming education, social welfare, and public housing, before its ultimate defeat by the fascist right in the 1934 Austrian Civil War. Rabinbach concluded that "it was the very achievement and success of the Social Democrats that provided the basis for their capitulation to the right in 1934." In 1987, for his research on Red Vienna, Rabinbach was awarded the Victor Adler State Prize of the Republic of Austria (Victor-Adler-Staatspreis für Geschichte sozialer Bewegungen), the highest honor for the humanities in Austria.

Rabinbach made significant contributions to the history of European fascism and National Socialism. Inspired by the cultural approaches of his mentor George Mosse and by Ernst Bloch's theory of fascism's multiple and contradictory temporalities, he characterized National Socialism not as a rigid and coherent political ideology but rather as a flexible "cultural synthesis," Gesinnung (ethos), and Haltung (stance, disposition, or posture). As he explained, "National Socialism was a cultural synthesis fusing diverse and incompatible elements from a modern industrial society with a fundamentally unstable admixture of romantic anti-capitalist, nationalist, technocratic, quasisocialist, radical völkisch, and bio-racial elements." In his view, National Socialist ideology was not simply a "mask" or false image of reality, but a constellation of popular cultural practices that "effectively reconciled contradictory elements in German culture." Nazi culture and ideology, he held, were thus "flexible enough to allow for a significant degree of plasticity and ambiguity without challenging the central precepts of the movement and the regime."

For his notable 1976 article "The Aesthetics of Production in the Third Reich," about the Beauty of Labour organization that operated in Nazi Germany from 1934 to 1945, Rabinbach interviewed the notorious former Nazi architect and armaments minister Albert Speer. In such works, Rabinbach attempted to refute the predominant idea at the time that "that Nazism was a kind of a retrograde neofeudalism and didn’t have a modernist dimension," and instead argued that "Nazism was a unique modernist project," including in its racial-utopian and genocidal aspects. This interest culminated in Rabinbach's 900-page The Third Reich Sourcebook (2013) co-edited with Sander Gilman, which covers almost all aspects of society in Nazi Germany, from the cult of the leader and racial theory, to antisemitism and sexuality, to industrial policy and the use of mass media.

Rabinbach is perhaps best known for his 1990 book The Human Motor: Energy, Fatigue, and the Origins of Modernity, which explored the nineteenth-century "energeticist" idea that the human body was an energy-consuming machine whose ability to work had to be optimized, lest it suffer exhaustion. While machines initially imitated human actions, this relationship came to be reversed following Hermann von Helmholtz's breakthroughs in thermodynamics around 1850. Rabinbach showed that the idea that human power was converted into work like an engine significantly influenced both capitalist and socialist utopian ideologies, as well as research into labor science and industrial psychology. The historian Martin Jay called this work "a classic of cultural studies" that "revealed for the first time the importance of the late-19th-century European obsession with the laboring body and its vicissitudes." The German historian Norbert Frei wrote that Rabinbach is "widely known beyond the confines of his field" for this work, which has been also translated into German (2001) and French (2005). Rabinbach's 2018 follow-up book The Eclipse of the Utopias of Labor traced the decline of the utopian idea of "man as machine" after 1945 and explored its afterimages in an economy increasingly determined by knowledge and computers.

In 2012 a special issue of New German Critique was dedicated to Rabinbach's work and legacy. In their introduction to the issue, David Bathrick and Andreas Huyssen note Rabinbach's "compelling... staging of texts and debates written by or involving public intellectuals that have arisen in moments of crisis, catastrophe, or apocalypse," including his seminal writings on Theodor W. Adorno, Hannah Arendt, Walter Benjamin, Ernst Bloch, Martin Heidegger, Max Horkheimer, Karl Jaspers, and Raphael Lemkin. In his 1997 book In the Shadow of Catastrophe: German Intellectuals between Apocalypse and Enlightenment, Rabinbach characterizes these authors' writings on Europe's cataclysmic twentieth century as "attempts to translate that experience into a philosophical language whose legacy still exerts a powerful intellectual and sometimes even political influence today." These thinkers, he explained, saw catastrophes like World War II as "at once a deep rupture in the course of modernity and as the apotheosis of Western thought." Asked in an interview about the relationship between catastrophic events and the history of thought, Rabinbach explained that his method sought to consider both "the event as part of the text" and "the text itself as event," and "to draw on both these alternatives."

Rabinbach's late work employed methods of conceptual history inspired by Reinhart Koselleck and applied them to twentieth-century concepts including totalitarianism, antifascism, and genocide. He characterized the invention of these fundamental social and political concepts as historical "events" in themselves. Following Koselleck's insight that concepts contain multiple temporal and semantic layers or sediments, Rabinbach described these concepts as "semantic stockpiles" "without which no political action or social behavior is possible" and which "are by nature unstable, repurposing past and present temporalities for new historical circumstances." In contrast to the open-ended, utopian horizon of expectation theorized by Koselleck in the modern Sattelzeit, these Cold War concepts, shaped by the catastrophic events of the twentieth century, expressed neither futurity nor acceleration but dystopia and deceleration.

Rabinbach was the recipient of fellowships from the John Simon Guggenheim Memorial Foundation, the National Endowment for the Humanities, the Fulbright Program (as a visiting professor at Smolny College in St. Petersburg, Russia), and the American Academy in Berlin.

At Princeton, Rabinbach taught courses on twentieth-century Europe, European intellectual and cultural history, Fascism, and conceptual history in the tradition of Reinhart Koselleck. From 1996 to 2008 he was director of Princeton University’s Program in European Cultural Studies. He was a visiting professor at the University of Jena, the University of Bremen, Smolny College of Saint Petersburg State University, and the École des Hautes Études en Sciences Sociales.

Rabinbach has been described as a "New York intellectual." His popular writings and reviews have appeared in Dissent, The Nation, Times Literary Supplement, and The New York Times.

== Personal life and death ==
From 1980 to 2009 Rabinbach was married to the feminist psychoanalyst Jessica Benjamin, with whom he had two children. He lived in New York City. He died in Rome on February 2, 2025, at the age of 79.

== Bibliography ==
Books

- The Crisis of Austrian Socialism: From Red Vienna to Civil War, 1927-1934. Chicago: University of Chicago Press. 1983. ISBN 9780226701219.
- The Human Motor: Energy, Fatigue, and the Origins of Modernity. New York: Basic Books. 1990. ISBN 9780465031306.
- In the Shadow of Catastrophe: German Intellectuals Between Apocalypse and Enlightenment. Berkeley: University of California Press. 1997. ISBN 9780520226906.
- Begriffe aus dem Kalten Krieg: Totalitarismus, Antifaschismus, Genozid. Göttingen: Jena Center. Geschichte des 20. Jahrhunderts. Vorträge und Kolloquien; Bd. 5, Wallstein Verlag. 2009. ISBN 9783835304123.
- The Eclipse of the Utopias of Labor. New York: Fordham University Press, Forms of Living Series. 2018. ISBN 9780823278572.
- Staging the Third Reich: Essays in Cultural and Intellectual History. London: Routledge, edited by Stefanos Geroulanos and Dagmar Herzog. 2020. ISBN 9781000077490.

Edited books

- The Austrian Socialist Experiment: Social Democracy and Austromarxism, 1918-1934. Boulder, Colorado: Westview Press. 1985. ISBN 9780813301860.
- Germans and Jews Since the Holocaust: The Changing Situation in West Germany. New York: Holmes and Maier. 1986. ISBN 9780841909250. Co-edited with Jack Zipes.
- Nazi Germany and the Humanities. Oxford: One World Press. 2007. ISBN 9781780744346. Co-edited with Wolfgang Bialas.
- The Third Reich Sourcebook. Berkeley: The University of California Press. 2013. ISBN 9780520276833. Co-edited with Sander Gilman.

Notable articles

- Rabinbach, Anson G. (1976). "The Aesthetics of Production in the Third Reich". Journal of Contemporary History. 11 (4): 43–74. doi:10.1177/002200947601100405. JSTOR 260191. S2CID 141309841.
- Rabinbach, Anson (2004). "Eichmann in New York: The New York Intellectuals and the Hannah Arendt Controversy". October. 104: 97–111. doi:10.1162/016228704774115735. JSTOR 3397616. S2CID 57559618.
- "The Challenge of the Unprecedented: Raphael Lemkin and the Concept of Genocide". Simon Dubnow Institute Yearbook. 4: 397–420. 2005.
