= The Invention of Religion =

2015 book by Jan Assmann

- Author: Jan Assmann
- Translator: Robert Savage
- Language: German
- Publisher: C. H. Beck
- Publication date: 21 January 2015
- Publication place: Germany
- English publication date: 27 March 2018
- Pages: 493
- ISBN: 978-3-406-67430-3

The Invention of Religion: Faith and Covenant in the Book of Exodus (German: Exodus. Die Revolution der Alten Welt, lit. 'Exodus: The Revolution of the Old World') is a 2015 book by the German Egyptologist Jan Assmann. The book was published in English translation in 2018.

== Summary ==
The book is about the Exodus story as an influential myth, covering its motifs, reception history and continuing impact on thoughts and actions. Assmann used this to revise his understanding of monotheism presented in his 1997 book Moses the Egyptian. In the earlier book, he had presented the distinction between true and false as foundational to monotheism, but in the story about monotheism's origin in the Exodus texts, there is no such distinction.

The Exodus story established revelation, miracles, faith and group distinction based on proper worship as defining characteristics of what would become known as religion. Assmann identified the covenant—that there is a special bond between God and the Israelites—as the story's most radical component, as it challenged basic ancient assumptions about the relationship between humans and the divine. The Exodus story lacks the universalism of the Genesis creation narrative: instead of the indiscriminate "monotheism of truth" of the Book of Genesis, there is a "monotheism of loyalty", which is contractual and about the Israelites alone. The Exodus authors rejected an earlier view of laws as created by humans under divine authority, replacing it with a view of laws as given directly by God. This has revolutionary implications, as it replaces the legal authority of kings with the people of the covenant.

The book covers the implications of "monotheism of loyalty" in the historical reality where the texts about the Exodus were created. It addresses its political prevalence, notably in religious violence in past and present times. It goes into its treatment in modern cultural depictions, such as the oratorium Israel in Egypt by George Frideric Handel, the opera Moses und Aron by Arnold Schoenberg and the novel Thera by Zeruya Shalev.

== Reception ==
Oliver Kohns of literaturekritik.de wrote that the book's most inspiring part is where it distinguishes between two parallel types of monotheism in the Hebrew Bible. Kohns wrote that Assmann provides a "colourful and consistently stimulating, but by necessity also very heterogeneous and in places merely sketched out picture", where the wide range leaves many questions open, and the book becomes unable to yield "a coherent picture with a consistently developed thesis".

Christiane Florin of Deutschlandfunk wrote that the book is demanding but Assmann manages to lead the reader through its subject, which is covered with both detail and breadth, although familiarity with Assmann's other works and literature on Moses is needed to fully appreciate the details. Associating the passages about religious violence with the January 2015 Île-de-France attacks, she called the book "more elegant and explosive than much of what was published about religious violence after the Paris attacks".
