= Cultural Memory and Early Civilization =

1992 book by Jan Assmann

- Author: Jan Assmann
- Original title: Das kulturelle Gedächtnis
- Translator: David Henry Wilson
- Language: German
- Publisher: C. H. Beck
- Publication date: 1992
- Publication place: Germany
- English publication date: 5 December 2011
- Pages: 344
- ISBN: 3406360882

Cultural Memory and Early Civilization: Writing, Remembrance, and Political Imagination is a 1992 book by the German Egyptologist Jan Assmann.

== Summary ==
In the first part, Jan Assmann presents a model for the emergence and development of cultural identity. He describes a pattern of culturally transmitted rituals and behaviours that emulate the immediately preceding generations, communicative memory that is oral and spans three to four generations, and eventually cultural memory in the form of canonized writings. The second part consists of case studies of writings from ancient Egypt, the ancient Near East, the Hittites and ancient Greece. The book primarily builds on approaches to remembrance developed by Maurice Halbwachs.

== Reception ==
The book was published by C. H. Beck in German in 1992 and by Cambridge University Press in David Henry Wilson's English translation in 2011. Upon the English publication, Anthony Spalinger praised the first part's coverage of "the theoretical-sociological dimension of Cultural Memory", but wrote that the case studies in the second part raise questions due to Assmann's frequent avoidance of the role of conflict in the formation of cultural memory.

== See also ==
- Collective memory
