= Friedenspreis des Deutschen Buchhandels =

International peace prize

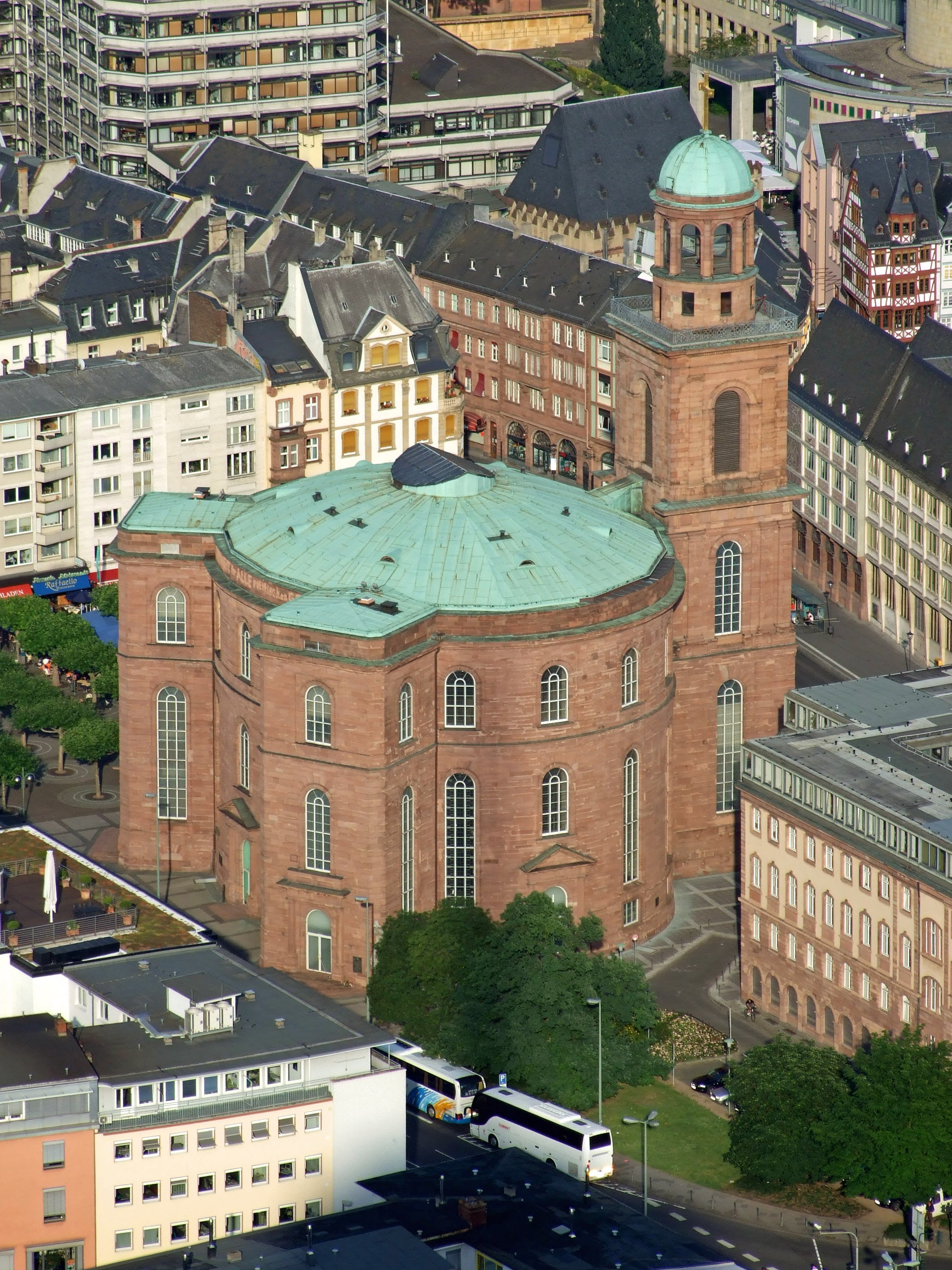
- Paulskirche in Frankfurt (2007)
- Location: St. Paul's Church, Frankfurt am Main
- Country: Germany
- Hosted by: Börsenverein des Deutschen Buchhandels (English: German Publishers and Booksellers Association)
- Reward: €25,000
- First award: 1950
- Website: www.friedenspreis-des-deutschen-buchhandels.de (in German and English)

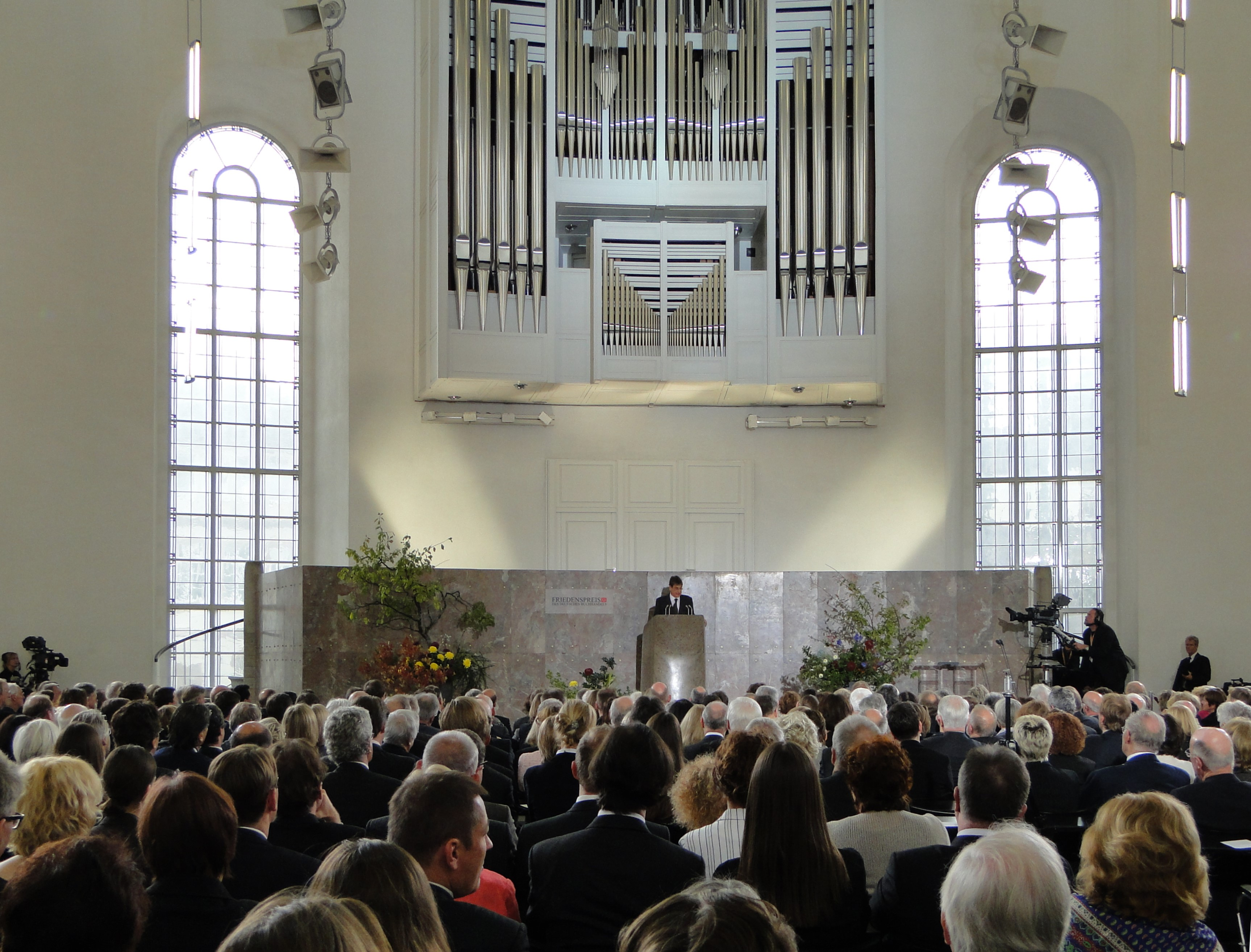
Ceremony in 2009

Friedenspreis des Deutschen Buchhandels is an international peace prize awarded annually by the Börsenverein des Deutschen Buchhandels (English: German Publishers and Booksellers Association), which runs the Frankfurt Book Fair. The award ceremony is held in the Paulskirche in Frankfurt. The prize has been awarded since 1950. The recipient is remunerated with €25,000.

According to its statutes, the association "is committed to peace, humanity, and understanding among all peoples and nations of the world. The Peace Prize promotes international tolerance by acknowledging individuals who have contributed to these ideals through their exceptional activities, especially in the fields of literature, science, and art. Prize winners are chosen without any reference to their national, racial or religious background." Traditionally, the President of Germany and leading political, cultural and diplomatic personalities attend the ceremony, and German public television covers the event.

== Recipients ==
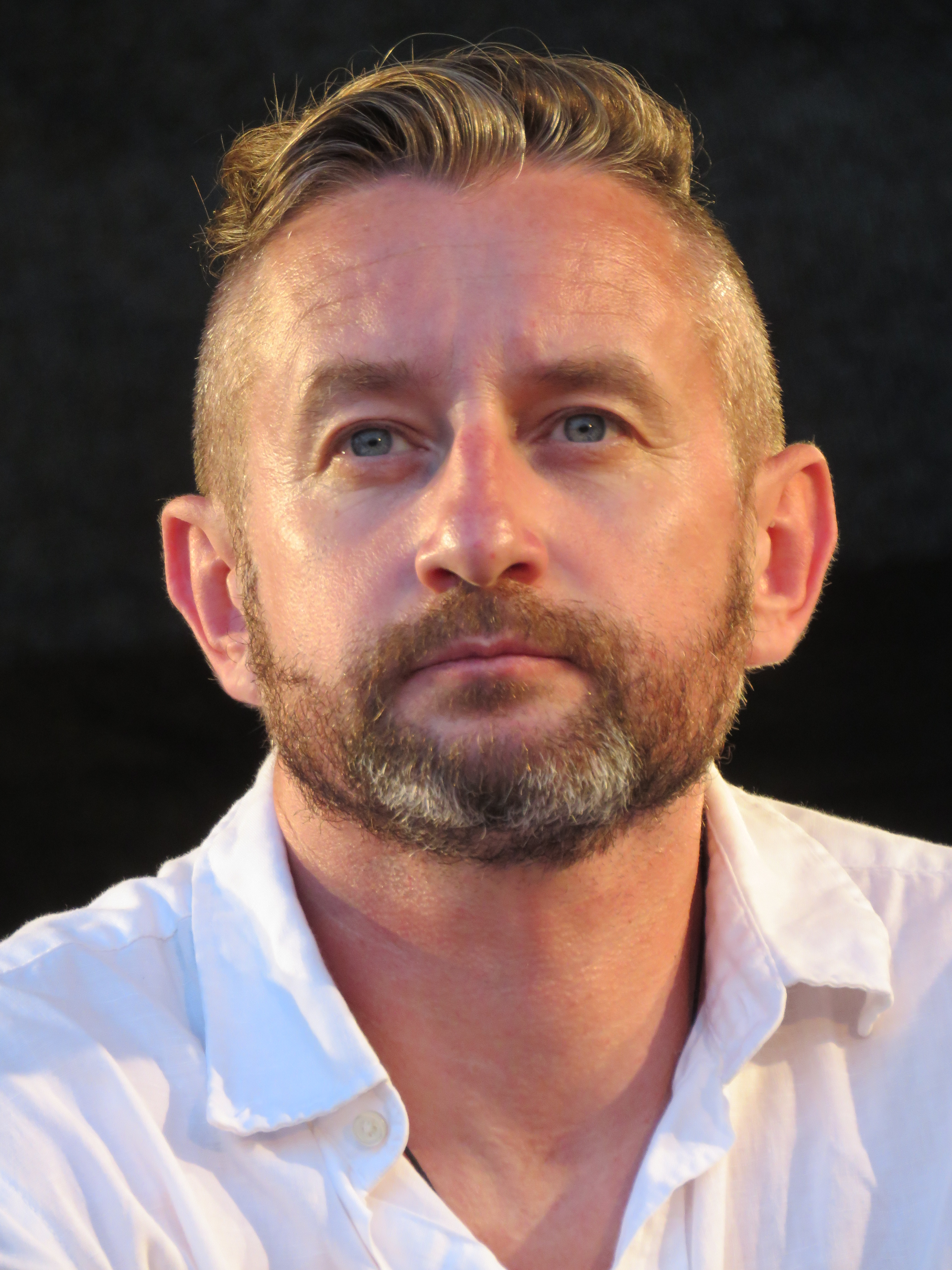
Serhiy Zhadan, 2022

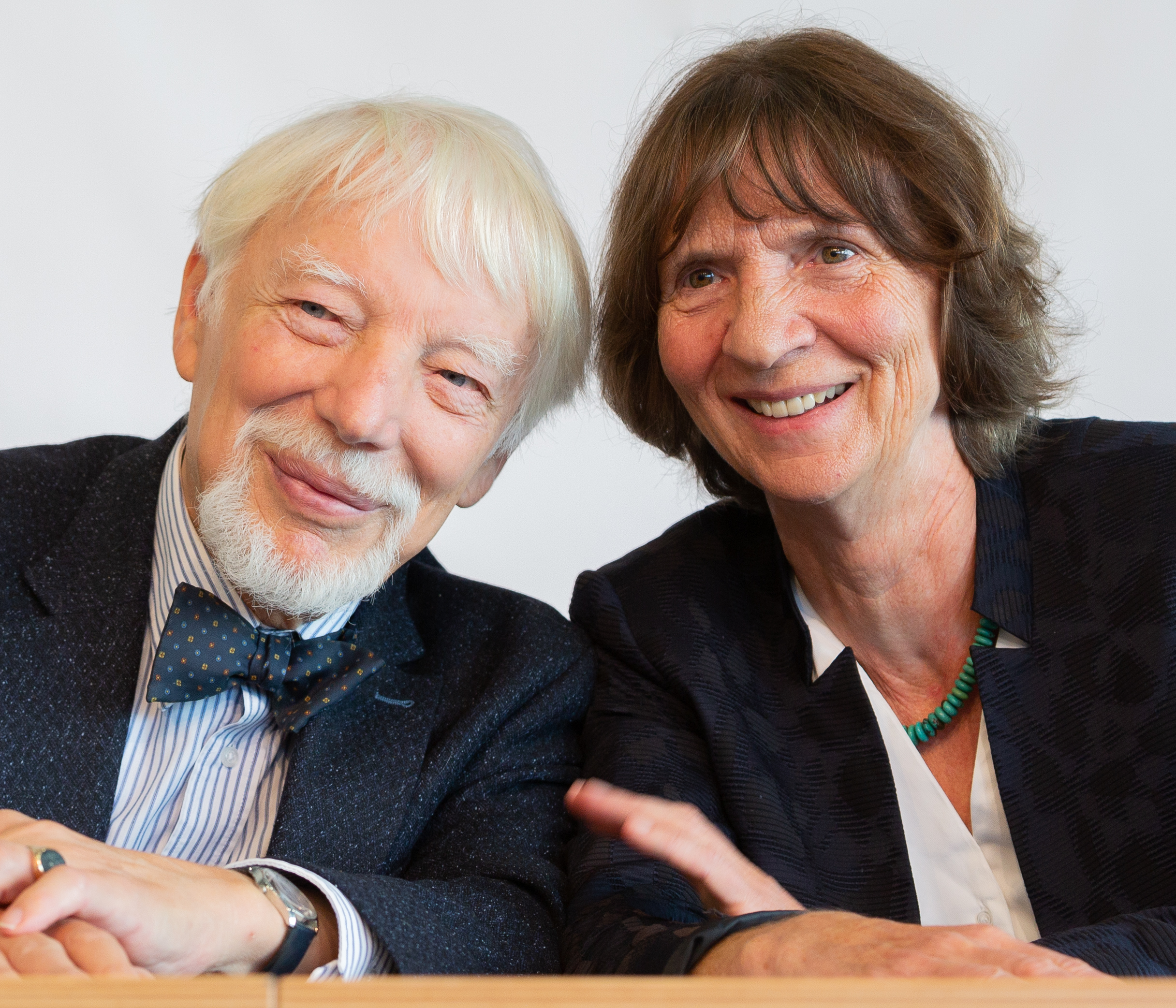
Aleida and Jan Assmann, 2018

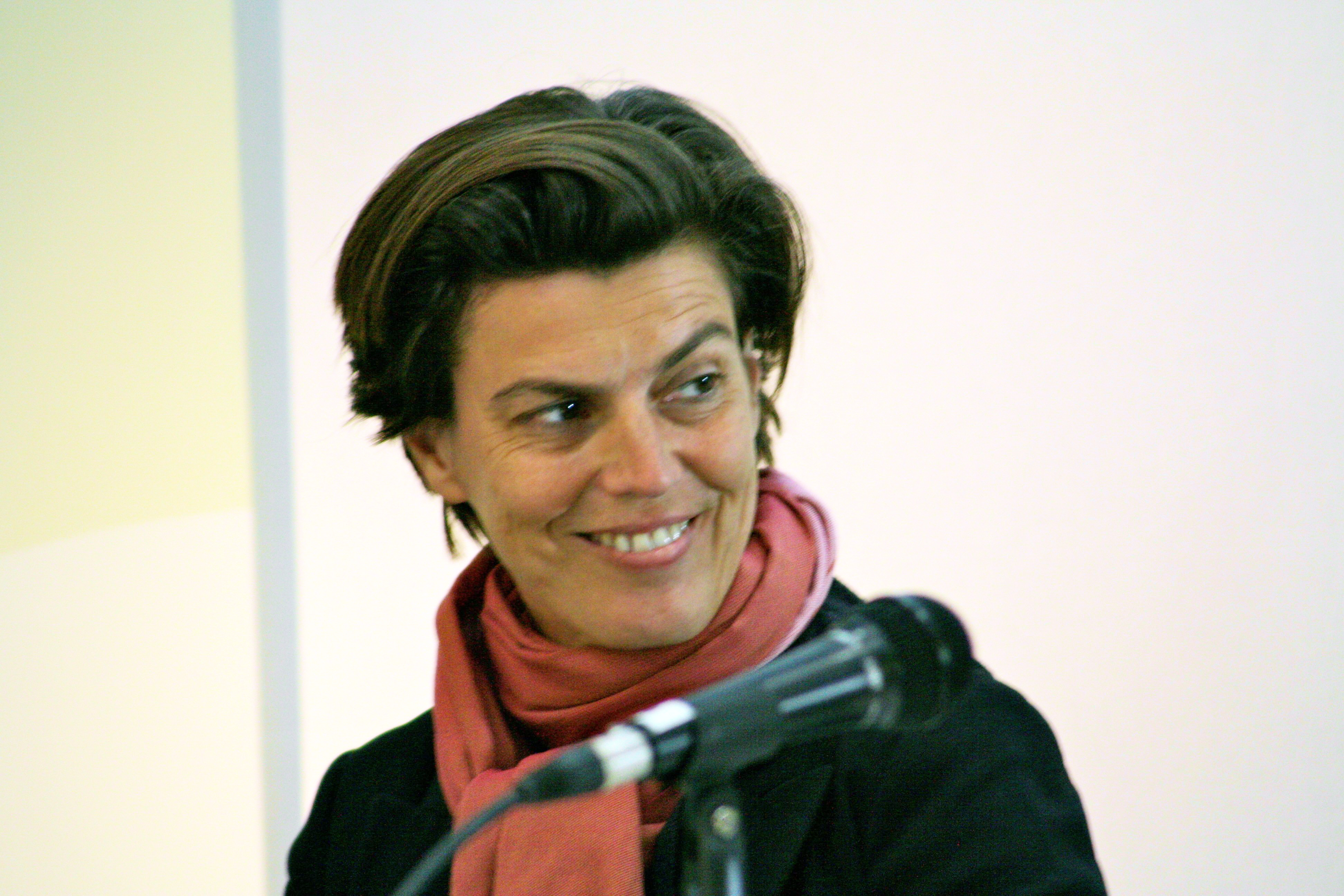
Carolin Emcke, 2016

=== 2020 – present ===
- 2026 – (United Kingdom) Philippe Sands (Mirjam Zadoff)
- 2025 – (Germany) Karl Schlögel (Katja Petrowskaja)
- 2024 – (Poland) (United States) Anne Applebaum (Irina Scherbakowa)
- 2023 – (United Kingdom) Salman Rushdie (Daniel Kehlmann)
- 2022 – (Ukraine) Serhiy Zhadan (Sasha Marianna Salzmann)
- 2021 – (Zimbabwe) Tsitsi Dangarembga (Auma Obama)
- 2020 – (India) Amartya Kumar Sen (Frank-Walter Steinmeier)

=== 2010–2019 ===
- 2019 – (Brazil) Sebastião Salgado (Wim Wenders)
- 2018 – (Germany) Aleida and Jan Assmann (Hans Ulrich Gumbrecht)
- 2017 – (Canada) Margaret Atwood (Eva Menasse)
- 2016 – (Germany) Carolin Emcke (Seyla Benhabib)
- 2015 – (Germany) Navid Kermani (Norbert Miller)
- 2014 – (United States) Jaron Lanier (Martin Schulz)
- 2013 – (Belarus) Svetlana Alexievich (Karl Schlögel)
- 2012 – (China) Liao Yiwu (Felicitas von Lovenberg)
- 2011 – (Algeria) Boualem Sansal (Peter von Matt)
- 2010 – (Israel) David Grossman (Joachim Gauck)

=== 2000–2009 ===
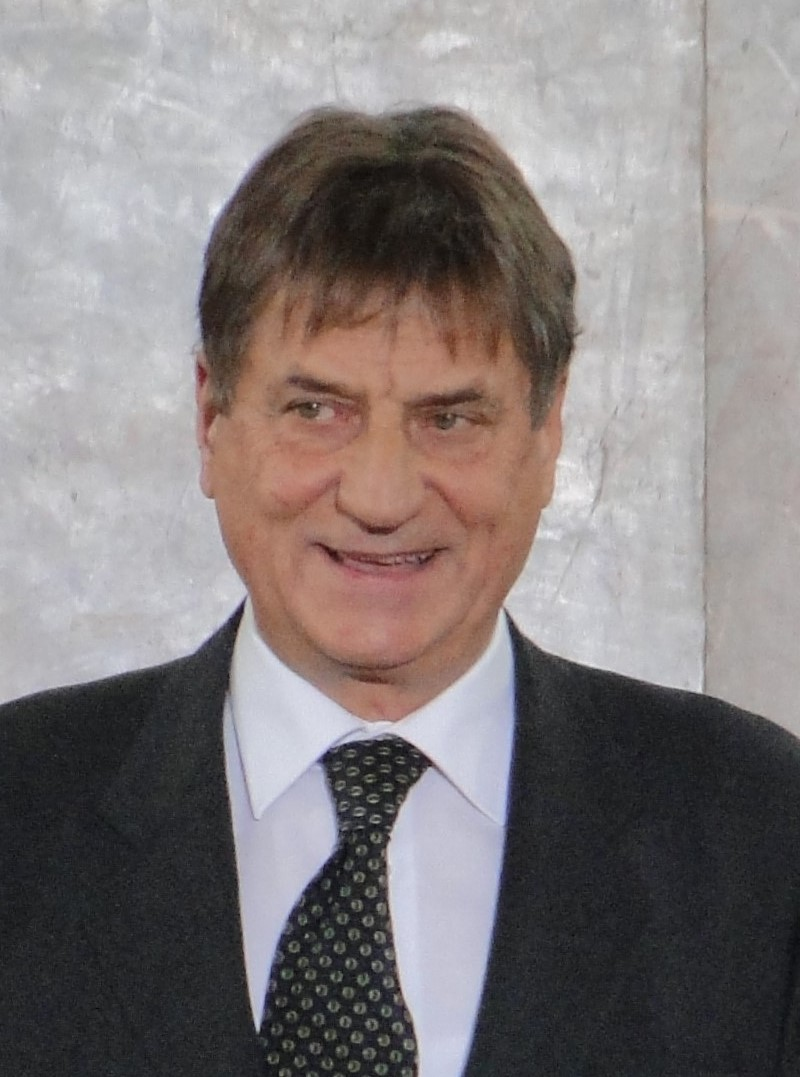
Claudio Magris, 2009

- 2009 – (Italy) Claudio Magris (Karl Schlögel)
- 2008 – (Germany) Anselm Kiefer (Werner Spies)
- 2007 – (Israel) Saul Friedländer (Wolfgang Frühwald)
- 2006 – (Germany) Wolf Lepenies (Andrei Pleșu)
- 2005 – (Turkey) Orhan Pamuk (Joachim Sartorius)
- 2004 – (Hungary) Péter Esterházy (Michael Naumann)
- 2003 – (United States) Susan Sontag (Ivan Nagel)
- 2002 – (Nigeria) Chinua Achebe (Theodor Berchem)
- 2001 – (Germany) Jürgen Habermas (Jan Philipp Reemtsma)
- 2000 – (Algeria) Assia Djebar (Barbara Frischmuth)

=== 1990–1999 ===
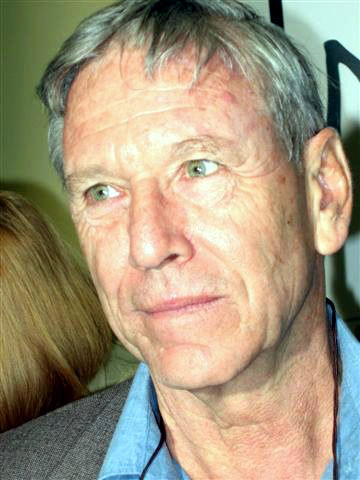
Amos Oz, 1992

- 1999 – (United States) Fritz Stern (Bronisław Geremek)
- 1998 – (Germany) Martin Walser (Frank Schirrmacher)
- 1997 – (Turkey) Yaşar Kemal (Günter Grass)
- 1996 – (Peru) Mario Vargas Llosa (Jorge Semprún)
- 1995 – (Germany) Annemarie Schimmel (Roman Herzog)
- 1994 – (Spain) Jorge Semprún (Wolf Lepenies)
- 1993 – (Germany) Friedrich Schorlemmer (Richard von Weizsäcker)
- 1992 – (Israel) Amos Oz (Siegfried Lenz)
- 1991 – (Hungary) György Konrád (Jorge Semprún)
- 1990 – (Germany) Karl Dedecius (Heinrich Olschowsky)

=== 1980–1989 ===
- 1989 – (Czechoslovakia) Václav Havel (André Glucksmann)
- 1988 – (Germany) Siegfried Lenz (Yohanan Meroz)
- 1987 – (Germany) Hans Jonas (Robert Spaemann)
- 1986 – (Poland) Władysław Bartoszewski (Hans Maier)
- 1985 – (Israel) Teddy Kollek (Manfred Rommel)
- 1984 – (Mexico) Octavio Paz (Richard von Weizsäcker)
- 1983 – (Austria) Manès Sperber (Siegfried Lenz)
- 1982 – (United States) George F. Kennan (Carl Friedrich von Weizsäcker)
- 1981 – (Soviet Union) Lev Kopelev (Marion Gräfin Dönhoff)
- 1980 – (Nicaragua) Ernesto Cardenal (Johann Baptist Metz)

=== 1970–1979 ===
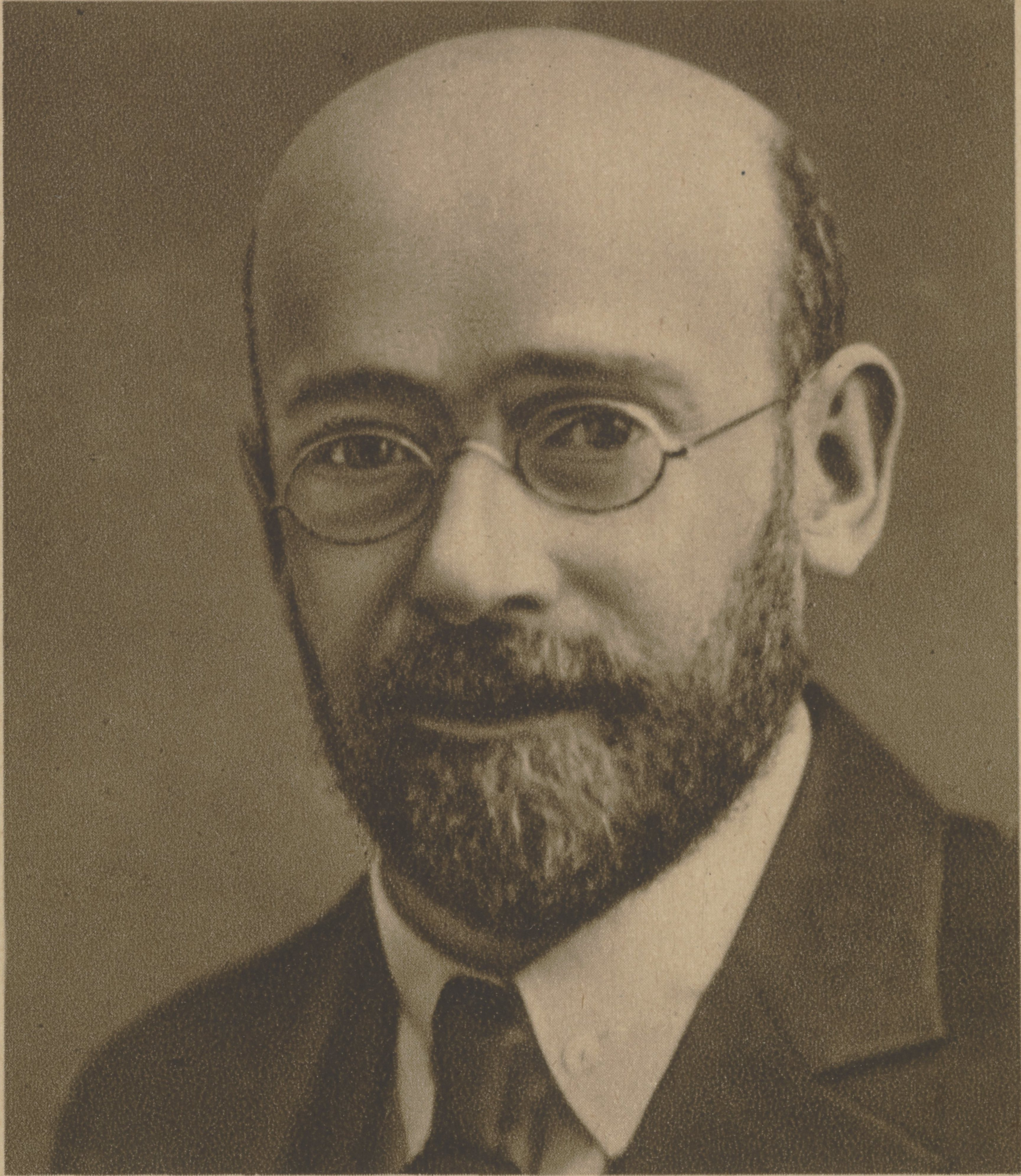
Janusz Korczak, 1972

- 1979 – (United States) Yehudi Menuhin (Pierre Bertaux)
- 1978 – (Sweden) Astrid Lindgren (Gerold Ummo Becker and Frederik Hetmann)
- 1977 – (Poland) Leszek Kołakowski (Gesine Schwan)
- 1976 – (Switzerland) Max Frisch (Hartmut von Hentig)
- 1975 – (Germany) Alfred Grosser (Paul Frank)
- 1974 – (Switzerland) Frère Roger, prior of Taizé (nobody)
- 1973 – Club of Rome (Nello Celio)
- 1972 – (Poland) Janusz Korczak (posthumous) (Hartmut von Hentig)
- 1971 – (Germany) Marion Gräfin Dönhoff (Alfred Grosser)
- 1970 – (Sweden) Alva Myrdal and Gunnar Myrdal (together) (Karl Kaiser)

=== 1960–1969 ===
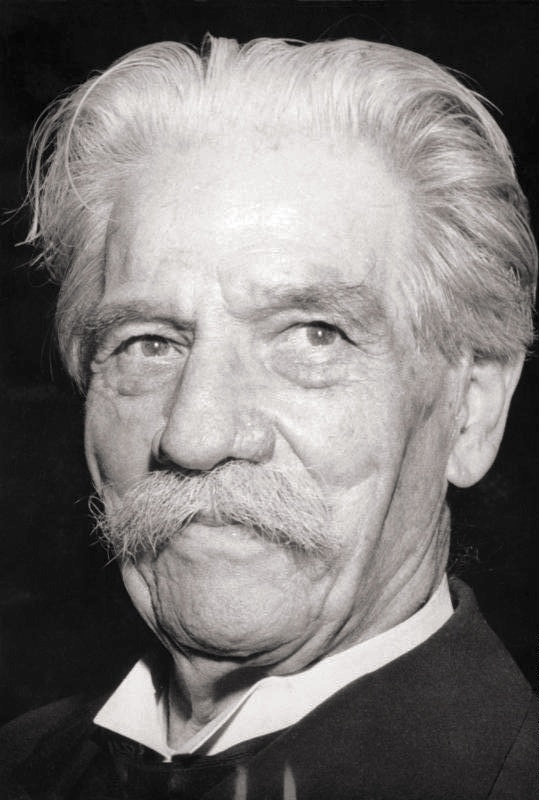
Albert Schweitzer, 1951

- 1969 – (Germany) Alexander Mitscherlich (Heinz Kohut)
- 1968 – (Senegal) Léopold Sédar Senghor (François Bondy)
- 1967 – (Germany) Ernst Bloch (Werner Maihofer)
- 1966 – (Germany) Augustin Bea and (Netherlands) W. A. Visser 't Hooft (together) (Paul Mikat)
- 1965 – (Germany) Nelly Sachs (Werner Weber)
- 1964 – (France) Gabriel Marcel (Carlo Schmid)
- 1963 – (Germany) Carl Friedrich von Weizsäcker (Georg Picht)
- 1962 – (United States) Paul Tillich (Otto Dibelius)
- 1961 – (India) Sarvepalli Radhakrishnan (Ernst Benz)
- 1960 – (United Kingdom) Victor Gollancz (Heinrich Lübke)

=== 1950–1959 ===
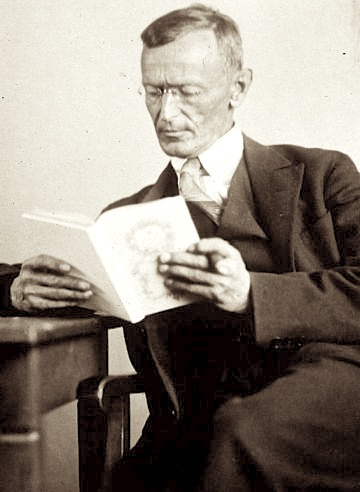
Hermann Hesse, 1955

- 1959 – (Germany) Theodor Heuss (Benno Reifenberg)
- 1958 – (Germany) Karl Jaspers (Hannah Arendt)
- 1957 – (United States) Thornton Wilder (Carl Jacob Burckhardt)
- 1956 – (Germany) Reinhold Schneider (Werner Bergengruen)
- 1955 – (Germany) Hermann Hesse (Richard Benz)
- 1954 – (Switzerland) Carl Jacob Burckhardt (Theodor Heuss)
- 1953 – (Israel) Martin Buber (Albrecht Goes)
- 1952 – (Germany) Romano Guardini (Ernst Reuter)
- 1951 – (France) Albert Schweitzer (Theodor Heuss)
- 1950 – (Norway) Max Tau (Adolf Grimme)
