= Moses the Egyptian =

1997 book by Jan Assmann

- Author: Jan Assmann
- Language: English
- Publisher: Harvard University Press
- Publication date: 31 Juli 1997
- Publication place: United States
- Pages: 284
- ISBN: 978-0674587380

Moses the Egyptian: The Memory of Egypt in Western Monotheism is a 1997 book by the German Egyptologist Jan Assmann.

== Summary ==
Assmann describes the book as a work of mnemohistory, which means it is about how the past was remembered rather than the past as such. It is about the reception of monotheism and its association with Akhenaten and especially Moses. Assmann deals with different types of monotheism and their conflicts with other theologies. Whereas Akhenaten's monotheism remained rooted within the cosmos, Moses' theology relied on transcendence to became central to an anti-Egyptian counter-religion, notable in the Exodus story.

Assmann outlines what he calls the Mosaic distinction, where communities use the distinction between true and false, which is at the centre of transcendental monotheism, to proclaim everything outside of their own group as profoundly illegitimate. He covers reception and debates about these subjects in Christian and modern Europe, notably through the increased interest in Egypt during the Renaissance, during Napoleon's invasion of Egypt and in Sigmund Freud's book Moses and Monotheism.

== Reception ==
Moses the Egyptian was first published in English in 1997 and in Assmann's native German in 1998. It received wide acclaimed and became heavily discussed among Egyptologists and religious studies scholars.

== Legacy ==
In 2003, Assmann published the book The Price of Monotheism where he responded to critics of Moses the Egyptian and expanded on some of its material.

Assmann presented a revised view of the Hebrew Bible's monotheism in his book The Invention of Religion, published in 2015. In this book, he distinguished between a "monotheism of truth", which he had discussed in Moses the Egyptian, and a "monotheism of loyalty", where matters of true and false are unimportant. According to Assmann, these types of monotheism exist in parallel in the Torah and both are fundamentally political.
