= Jan Assmann =

German Egyptologist and religion scholar (1938–2024)

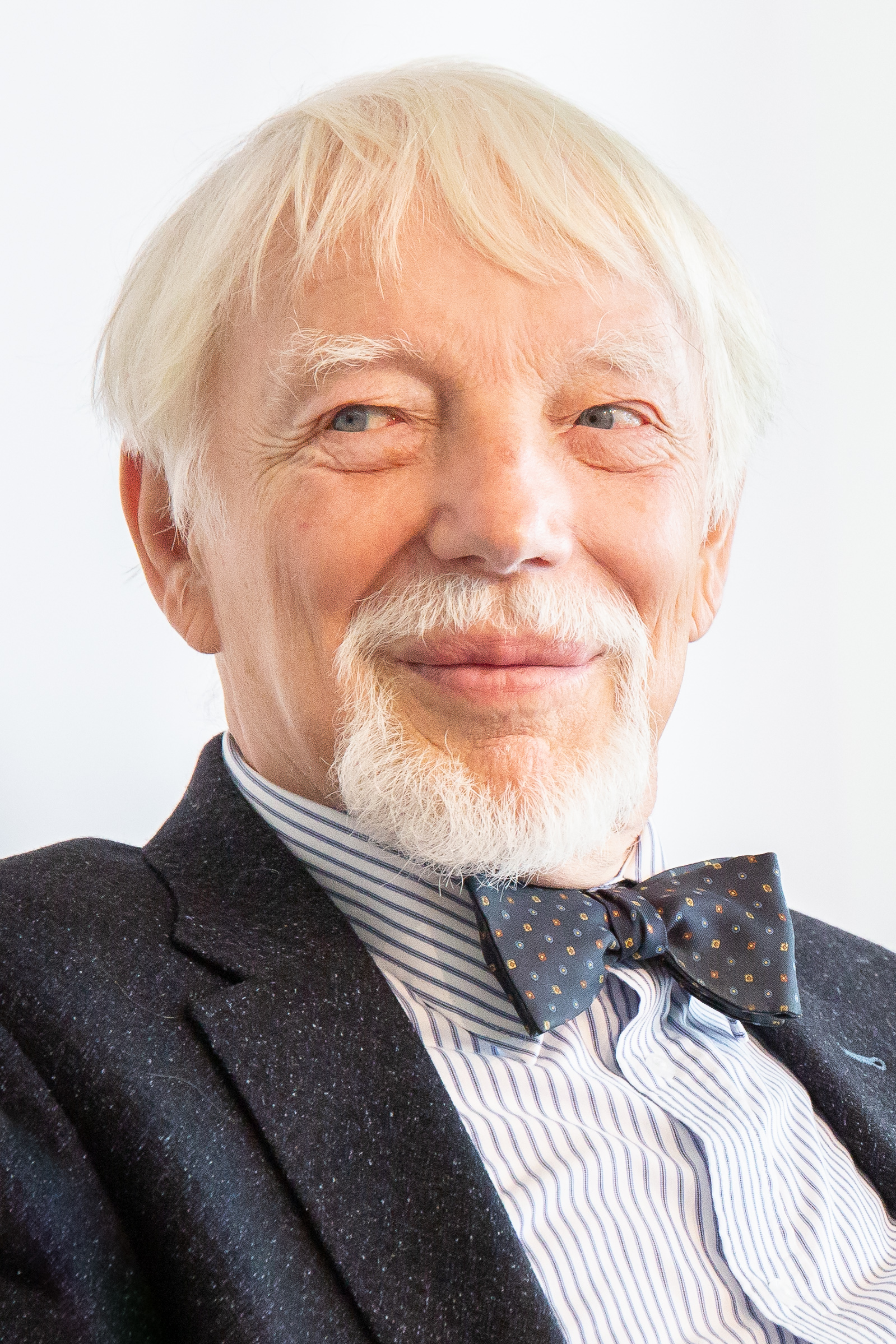
- Assmann in 2018
- Born: Johann Christoph Assmann; 7 July 1938; Langelsheim, Gau Southern Hanover-Brunswick, Germany
- Died: 19 February 2024 (aged 85); Konstanz, Baden-Württemberg, Germany
- Spouse: Aleida Assmann

Academic background
- Education: LMU Munich; Heidelberg University; University of Paris; University of Göttingen

Academic work
- Discipline: Egyptology; cultural history; religious studies
- Sub-discipline: Ancient Egyptian religion; cultural memory; monotheism
- Institutions: Heidelberg University; University of Konstanz

Johann Christoph "Jan" Assmann (7 July 1938 – 19 February 2024) was a German Egyptologist, cultural historian, and religion scholar.

== Life and works ==
Assmann studied Egyptology and classical archaeology at LMU Munich, Heidelberg University, the University of Paris, and the University of Göttingen. From 1966 to 1967, he was a fellow of the German Archaeological Institute in Cairo, where he continued as an independent scholar from 1967 to 1971. After completing his habilitation in 1971, he was named a professor of Egyptology at Heidelberg University in 1976, where he taught until his retirement in 2003. He was then named an Honorary Professor of Cultural Studies at the University of Konstanz.

In the 1990s, Assmann and his wife Aleida Assmann developed a theory of cultural and communicative memory that has received much international attention. He is also known beyond Egyptology circles for his interpretation of the origins of monotheism, which he considers as a break from earlier cosmotheism, first with Atenism and later with the Exodus from Egypt of the Israelites.

Assmann died on 19 February 2024, at the age of 85.

== Writings on Egyptian and other religions ==
Assmann suggested that the ancient Egyptian religion had a more significant influence on Judaism than is generally acknowledged. He used the term "normative inversion" to suggest that some aspects of Judaism were formulated in direct reaction to Egyptian practices and theology. He ascribed the principle of normative inversion to a principle established by Manetho which was used by Maimonides in his references to the Sabians. His book The Price of Monotheism received some criticism for his notion of The Mosaic Distinction. He too no longer held this theory, at least not in its original form (specifically, the mosaic aspect).

== Awards ==
- 1996 Max Planck Award for Research
- 1998 German Historians' Prize
- 1998 Honorary Doctorate in Theology from the Theology Faculty, Munster
- 2004 Soc.Sc.D. (honoris causa), Yale University
- 2005 Ph.D. (honoris causa), Hebrew University of Jerusalem
- 2006 Alfried Krupp Prize for Scholarship
- 2011 Großer Literaturpreis der Bayerischen Akademie der Schönen Künste
- 2016 Sigmund Freud Prize
- 2017 Balzan Prize for Collective Memory together with his wife Aleida Assmann
- 2018 Peace Prize of the German Book Trade together with his wife Aleida Assmann
- 2020 Pour le Mérite for Sciences and Arts together with his wife Aleida Assmann
- 2022 Knight Commander's Cross of the Order of Merit of the Federal Republic of Germany

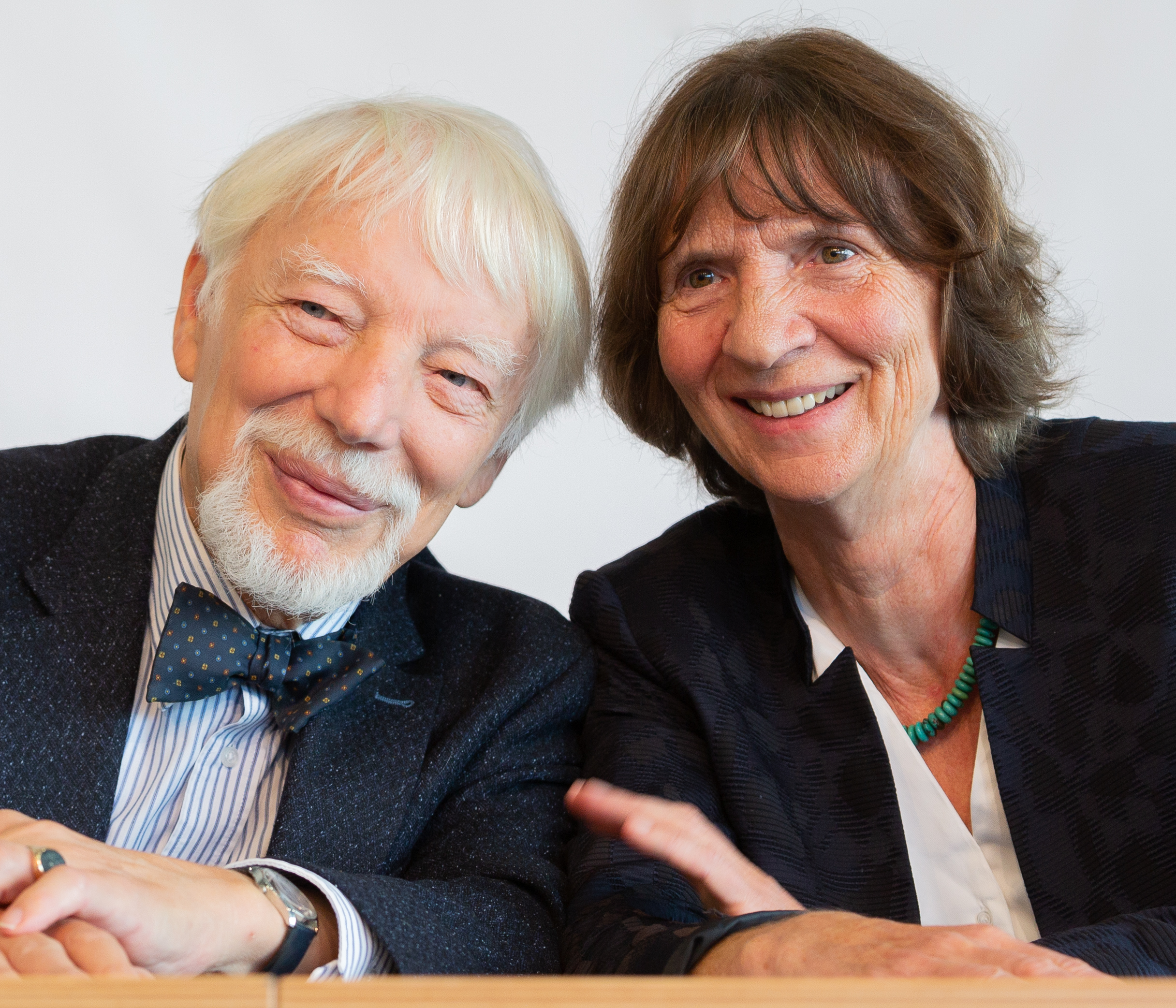
Jan and his wife Aleida Assmann at the October 2018 Frankfurt Book Fair.

== Publications ==
=== Books ===
- Re und Amun: Die Krise des polytheistischen Weltbilds im Ägypten der 18.-20. Dynastie (Orbis Biblicus et Orientalis 51). Fribourg and Göttingen 1983.
  - English translation: Egyptian Solar Religion in the New Kingdom: Re, Amun, and the Crisis of Polytheism (Studies in Egyptology) (1995) ISBN 0-7103-0465-X
- Ägypten: Theologie und Frömmigkeit einer frühen Hochkultur (Urban-Bücherei, vol. 366, Stuttgart 1984).
  - English translation: The Search for God in Ancient Egypt trans. David Lorton (2001) ISBN 0-8014-8729-3
- "Maât: l'Égypte pharaonique et l'idée de justice sociale" in: Conférences, essais et leçons du Collège de France. Paris: Julliard, 1989.
  - German version: Ma'at: Gerechtigkeit und Unsterblichkeit im alten Ägypten. Munich 1990 (Arabic Translation 1996).
- Stein und Zeit: Mensch und Gesellschaft im Alten Ägypten. Munich 1991.
- Das kulturelle Gedächtnis. Schrift, Erinnerung und politische Identität in frühen Hochkulturen. Munich 1992. ISBN 3-406-36088-2 ASIN B001C84TR4
  - English translation: Cultural Memory and Early Civilization: Writing, Remembrance, and Political Imagination. Cambridge University Press, 2011. ISBN 978-0-521-18802-9
- Monotheismus und Kosmotheismus (1993) ISBN 3-8253-0026-9
- Ägypten: Eine Sinngeschichte (Munich: Hanser 1996; Frankfurt: Fischer, 1999)
  - English translation: The Mind of Egypt: History and Meaning in the Time of the Pharaohs (New York : Metropolitan Books, 2002; Harvard University Press, 2003).
- Moses der Ägypter: Entzifferung einer Gedächtnisspur. Munich 1998.
  - English translation: Moses the Egyptian: The Memory of Egypt in Western Monotheism (Cambridge, Mass.: Harvard University Press, 1997; 1998) ISBN 0-674-58739-1
- Weisheit und Mysterium: Das Bild der Griechen von Ägypten. Munich 2000. ISBN 3-406-45899-8
- Herrschaft und Heil: Politische Theologie in Altägypten, Israel und Europa. Munich 2000. ISBN 3-596-15339-5
- Religion und kulturelles Gedächtnis: Zehn Studien (Munich: C.H. Beck, 2000). ISBN 3-406-45915-3
  - English translation: Religion and Cultural Memory: Ten Studies (Cultural Memory in the Present) trans. Rodney Livingstone, SUP (2005) ISBN 0-8047-4523-4
- Der Tod als Thema der Kulturtheorie (2000) ISBN 3-518-12157-X
- Tod und Jenseits im Alten Ägypten (Munich 2001). ISBN 3-406-49707-1
  - English translation: Death and Salvation in Ancient Egypt, trans. David Lorton (2006) ISBN 0-8014-4241-9
- Altägyptische Totenliturgien, Bd.1, Totenliturgien in den Sargtexten (2002) ISBN 3-8253-1199-6
- Die Mosaische Unterscheidung oder der Preis des Monotheismus. Munich 2003.
  - English translation: The Mosaic Distinction or The Price of Monotheism, trans. Robert Savage (SUP, 2009) ISBN 0-8047-6160-4
- Ägyptische Geheimnisse (2003) ISBN 3-7705-3687-8
- Theologie und Weisheit im alten Ägypten (2005) ISBN 3-7705-4069-7
- Die Zauberflöte (2005) ISBN 3-446-20673-6
- Thomas Mann und Ägypten: Mythos und Monotheismus in den Josephsromanen (Munich 2006).
- Monotheismus und die Sprache der Gewalt (2006) ISBN 3-85452-516-8
- Of God and Gods: Egypt, Israel, and the Rise of Monotheism (University of Wisconsin Press, 2008) ISBN 0-299-22554-2
- From Akhenaten to Moses. Ancient Egypt and religious change (The American University in Cairo Press 2014). Book Review by Paul Sanders (Protestant Theological University)
- Exodus. Die Revolution der Alten Welt (Munich 2015) ISBN 978-3-406-67430-3
  - English translation: The Invention of Religion: Faith and Covenant in the Book of Exodus. Princeton University Press. 2018. ISBN 9780691157085.

=== Articles ===
- State and religion in the New Kingdom, in Religion and Philosophy in Ancient Egypt, editor W.K Simpson (1989), pp. 55–88
- Death and AND Initiation in the Funerary Religion of Ancient Egypt in: W.K.Simpson (Hrsg.), Religion and Philosophy in Ancient Egypt, Yale Egyptological Studies 3, 1989, pp. 135–159
- Egyptian mortuary liturgies, in Studies in Egyptology, Presented to Miriam Lichtheim, ed. S.I. Groll (Jerusalem, 1990), pp. 1–45
- When justice fails: Jurisdiction and imprecation in Ancient Egypt and the Near East, JEA 78 (1992): pp. 149–162
- Akhanyati's Theology of Light and Time, Proceedings of the Israel Academy of Sciences and Humanities, VII 4, Jerusalem 1992, pp. 143–176
- Semiosis and Interpretation in Ancient Egyptian Ritual in Shlomo Biderstein, Ben-Ami Scharfstein (Hrsg.), Interpretation in Religion (Philosophy and Religion 2), Leiden 1992, pp. 87–109
- Ocular desire in a time of darkness. Urban festivals and divine visibility in Ancient Egypt in Oculare desire. Sehnsucht des Auges (Jahrbuch für Religiöse Anthropologie/Yearbook of Religious Anthropology) 1, 1994, pp. 13–29
- Jehova-Isis: The Mysteries of Egypt and the Quest for Natural Religion in the Age of Enlightenment in Irene. A. Bierman (Hrsg.), Egypt and the Fabrication of European Identity (UCLA Near East Center, Colloquium Series), Los Angeles 1995, pp. 35–83
- Moses und Echnaton: Religionsstifter im Zeichen der Wahrheit, in Bärbel Köhler (Hrsg.), Religion und Wahrheit. Religionsgeschichtliche Studien; Festschrift für Gernot Wießner zum 65. Geburtstag, Wiesbaden 1998, pp. 33–44
- MONO-, PAN-, AND COSMOTHEISM: THINKING THE ‘ONE’ IN EGYPTIAN THEOLOGY in Orient 33, 1998, pp. 130–149
- Ägyptische Religion in Johann Figl (Hrsg.), Handbuch Religionswissenschaft. Religionen und ihre zentralen Themen, Innsbruck-Wien 2003. pp. 104–117
- Theological responses to Amarna in Gary N. Knoppers, Antoine Hirsch (Hg.), Egypt, Israel, and the Ancient Mediterranean World. Studies in Honor of Donald B. Redford, Leiden/Boston 2004. pp. 179–191
- Der hebräische und der ägyptische Mose - Bilder und Gegenbilder in Manfred Oeming, Konrad Schmid, Michael Welker (Hg.), Das Alte Testament und die Kultur der Moderne (Altes Testament und Moderne 8), Münster 2004, pp. 147–155
- What’s Wrong with Images? in Maria Hlavajova, Sven Lütticken, Jill Winder (Hg.), The return of religion and other myths: a critical reader in contemporary art, Utrecht 2009. pp. 16–30
- Die Piye (Pianchi) Stele: Erzählung als Medium politischer Repräsentation, in Das Erzählen in frühen Hochkulturen I: Der Fall Ägypten (München: 2009), pp. 221–236
- Globalization, Universalism, and the Erosion of Cultural Memory, in Memory in a Global Age. Discourses, Practices and Trajectories], Palgrave Macmillan Memory Studies (New York: 2010), pp. 121–137
- Exodus and Memory in Thomas E. Levy, Thomas Schneider, William H. C. Propp (Hg.), Israel’s Exodus in transdisciplinary perspective. Text, archaeology, culture and geoscience, Cham; Heidelberg; New York; Dordrecht; London 2015. pp. 3–15
- For ye know the Heart of the Stranger': Empathy, Memory, and the Biblical Ideal of a 'Decent Society' in Aleida Assmann, Ines Detmers (Hg.), Empathy and its limits, Basingstoke, Hampshire 2016. pp. 187–201
- Monotheism Curse or Blessing? in Pirner, Manfred L.; Lähnemann, Johannes; Haussmann, Werner; Schwarz, Susanne (Hg.): Public Theology, Religious Diversity, and Interreligious Learning. Contributing to the Common Good Through Religious Education (Routledge Research in Religion and Education), New York; London 2018, pp. 94–104
- Politics, Religion and Violence: The Maccabean Wars in: Speight, C. Allen; Zank, Michael (Hg.): Politics, religion and political theology (Boston studies in philosophy, religion and public life 6), Dordrecht 2017, S. 151-164; Online-Veröffentlichung auf Propylaeum-DOK (2022), DOI: OnlineVeröffentlichung auf Propylaeum-DOK (2022), DOI: https://doi.org/10.11588/propylaeumdok.00005476
- Freud, Selliti, and the Murder of Moses in Gilad Sharvit, Karen S. Feldman (Hg.), Freud and Monotheism. Moses and the Violent Origins of Monotheism, New York 2018, pp. 138–156; OnlineVeröffentlichung auf Propylaeum-DOK (2022), DOI: https://doi.org/10.11588/propylaeumdok.00005620
