= Andreas Huyssen =

German-born American literary theorist

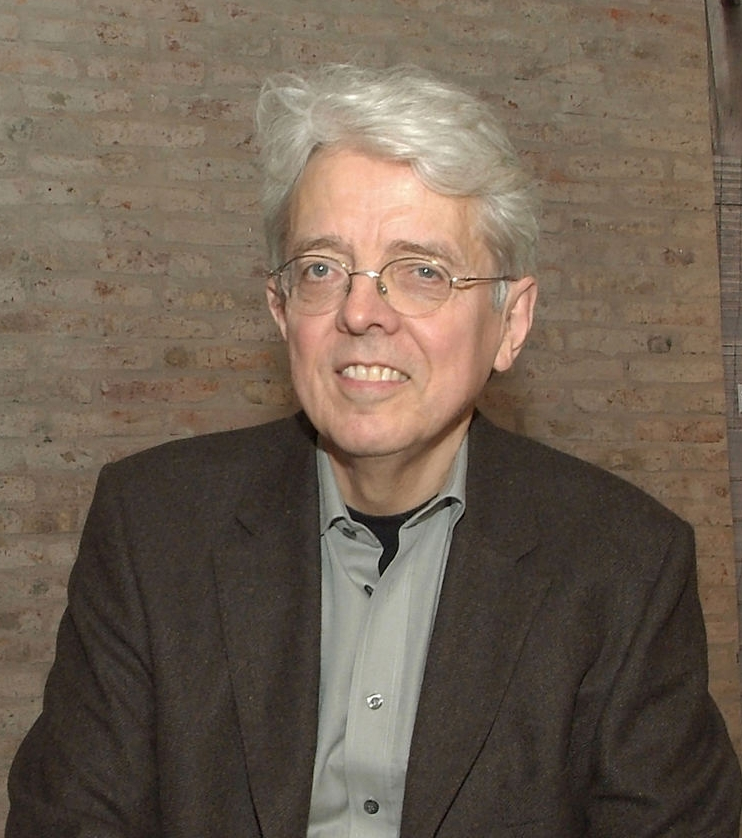
- Born: 1942 (age 83–84); Germany
- Education: University of Zürich
- Occupation: Literary theorist
- Spouse: Nina Bernstein
- Relatives: Lester Bernstein (father-in-law)

Andreas Huyssen (/ˈhaɪsən/; born 1942) is a German-born American literary theorist who is the Villard Professor Emeritus of German and Comparative Literature at Columbia University, where he taught beginning in 1986. He is the founding director of the university's Institute for Comparative Literature and Society and one of the founding editors of the New German Critique.

== Biography ==
Huyssen was born in Germany in 1942. He studied at several European universities in Madrid, Cologne, Paris, and Munich. He received his doctorate in Germanic and Romance Languages and Literature from the University of Zürich in 1969 under the direction of Emil Staiger, and taught at the University of Wisconsin–Milwaukee from 1971 until 1986, when he joined the faculty at Columbia. From 1986 to 1992 and again from 2005 to 2008, he served as head of Columbia's Germanic Languages and Literature department. From 1998 to 2003 he was founding director of the Center for Comparative Literature and Society. He was named a fellow of the American Academy of Arts and Sciences in 2022.

== Work ==
Huyssen is known for his work on 18th–20th century German literature and culture, international modernism and postmodernism, Frankfurt School critical theory, cultural memory, historical trauma, urban culture, and globalization. His work has appeared in translation in Spanish, Portuguese, Turkish, Chinese, Japanese, French, and other languages.

He is currently working on a book assembling and expanding his collected essays on the contemporary visual arts.

In addition to his editorship of the New German Critique, Huyssen serves on the editorial boards of October, Constellations, Memory Studies and Germanic Review.

== Personal life ==
He is married to The New York Times correspondent Nina Bernstein. Huyssen is a longtime friend of Nobel Prize-winning Turkish novelist Orhan Pamuk, and often hosts him when the writer comes to the U.S. The two teach an undergraduate class together at Columbia called "Words and Pictures," which examines problems of visual representation in literature, particularly theories of ekphrasis.

== Selected works ==
- Drama des Sturm und Drang (1980)
- The Vamp and the Machine: Technology and Sexuality in Fritz Lang's Metropolis (1981)
- After the Great Divide: Modernism, Mass Culture, Postmodernism (1986)
- Postmoderne: Zeichen eines kulturellen Wandels (ed. with Klaus Scherpe, 1986)
- Modernity and the Text: Revisions of German Modernism (ed. with David Bathrick, 1989)
- Twilight Memories: Marking Time in a Culture of Amnesia (1995)
- Present Pasts: Urban Palimpsests and the Politics of Memory (2003)
- Other Cities, Other Worlds: Urban Imaginaries in a Globalizing World (ed., 2008)
- William Kentridge, Nalini Malani: The Shadow Play as Medium of Memory (2013)
- Miniature Metropolis: Literature in an Age of Photography and Film (2015)
- Memory Art in the Contemporary World: Confronting Violence in the Global South (2022)
