= Böhen =

- Municipality
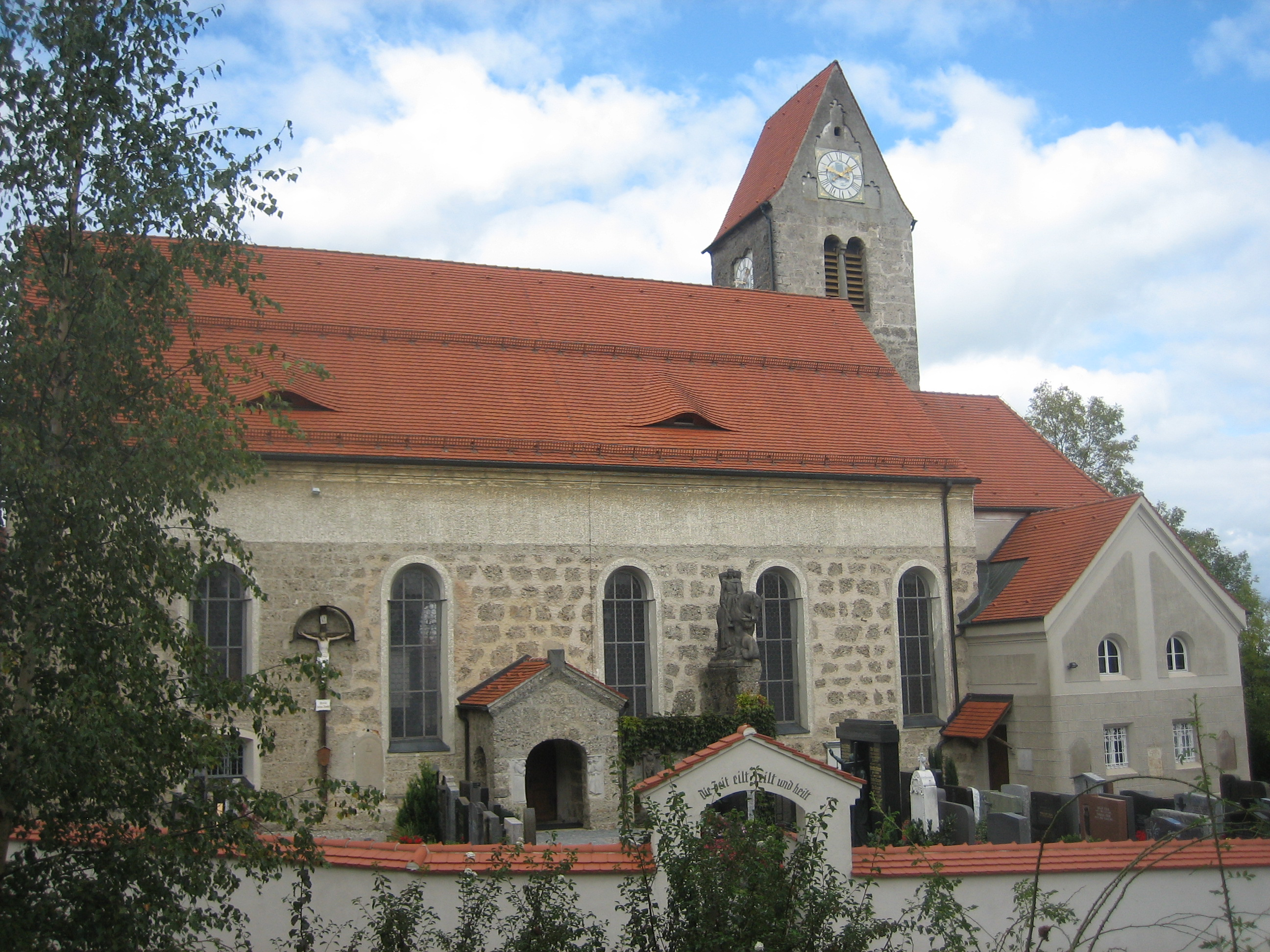
- Church of Saint George

- Coat of arms

- Location of Böhen within Unterallgäu district
- Interactive map of Böhen
- Location within Germany Location within Bavaria
- Coordinates: 47°53′N 10°18′E
- Country: Germany
- State: Bavaria
- Admin. region: Schwaben
- District: Unterallgäu
- Municipal assoc.: Ottobeuren

Government
  - Mayor (2020–26): Andreas Meer

Area
  - Total: 20.53 km^{2} (7.93 sq mi)
- Elevation: 783 m (2,569 ft)

Population (2025-12-31)
  - Total: 784
  - Density: 38.2/km^{2} (98.9/sq mi)
- Time zone: UTC+01:00 (CET)
  - Summer (DST): UTC+02:00 (CEST)
- Postal codes: 87736
- Dialling codes: 08338
- Vehicle registration: MN

Böhen is a municipality in the district of Unterallgäu in Bavaria, Germany. The town has a municipal association with Ottobeuren.

== Municipal subdivisions ==
The municipality consists only of the cadastral district of Böhen.

There are 26 municipal subdivisions (the type of settlement is given in parentheses):

- Berg (hamlet)
- Böhen (parish village)
- Brandholz (hamlet)
- Fricken (hamlet)
- Günzegg (village)
- Hüners (hamlet)
- Karlins (hamlet)
- Kräpflins (isolated settlement)
- Kuttern (isolated settlement)
- Lampolz (hamlet)
- Neuhaus (isolated settlement)
- Nollen (hamlet)
- Oberrechberg (isolated settlement)
- Oberwaldmühle (hamlet)
- Oberwarlins (village)
- Osterberg (hamlet)
- Pfaudlins (hamlet)
- Schögglins (isolated settlement)
- Schwanden (hamlet)
- Stöcken (hamlet)
- Theilen (isolated settlement)
- Unterrechberg (isolated settlement)
- Unterwaldmühle (hamlet)
- Unterwarlins (hamlet)
- Westenried (isolated settlement)
- Wies (hamlet)

The municipality covers a total area of 2,053 hectares.

Land use	Area			
Land use	Agricultural land	Forest	Buildings, open spaces and operational areas	Transport
Area in km²	14.22	5.17	0.52	0.49
Percentage of total area	69.3%	25.2%	2.5%	2.4%
Land use	Water	Sports and green spaces	Other uses	
Land use	Area in km²	0.10	0.03	0.01
Percentage of total area	0.5%	0.1%	0.0%	
