= Karl Schlögel =

German historian of Eastern Europe

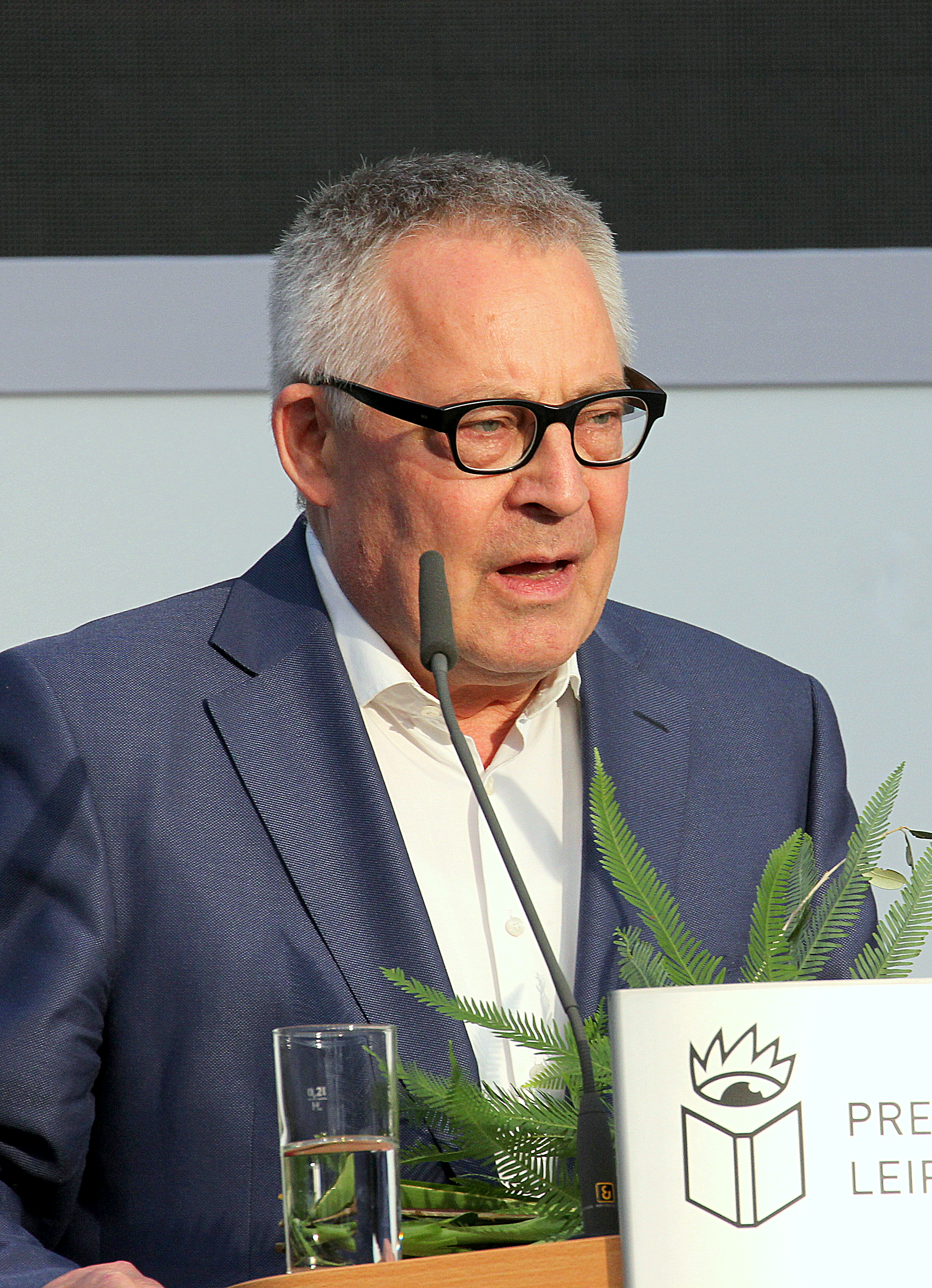
- Born: 7 March 1948 (age 78); Hawangen, Bavaria, Germany
- Awards: Sigmund Freud Prize (2004); Order of Merit of the Federal Republic of Germany (2005); Franz Werfel Human Rights Award (2012); Friedenspreis des Deutschen Buchhandels (2025)

Academic background
- Education: Free University of Berlin

Academic work
- Discipline: history
- Sub-discipline: Eastern European history
- Institutions: University of Konstanz; European University Viadrina
- Main interests: Stalinism; Russian diaspora and dissident movements; Eastern European cultural history
- Notable works: Moscow 1937

Karl Schlögel (born 7 March 1948 in Hawangen, Bavaria, Germany) is a noted German historian of Eastern Europe who specialises in modern Russia, the history of Stalinism, the Russian diaspora and dissident movements, Eastern European cultural history and theoretical problems of historical narration.

== Life and career ==
Schlögel studied philosophy, sociology, East European History and Slavic Studies at the Free University of Berlin from 1969 to 1981; this choice was inspired by visits to Czechoslovakia and the Soviet Union in 1965 and 1966 respectively. In these years he was actively involved in the left-wing student movement, publishing articles in various journals and articles. He reflected on this chapter in his life in the volume "Partei kaputt: Das Scheitern der KPD und die Krise der Linken" (Party kaputt: The failure of the West German Communist Party and the crisis of the Left.). In 1982–1983 he went to the M. V. Lomonosov Moscow State University on a research fellowship of the German Academic Exchange Service (DAAD). On his return he worked freelance as a translator and author, writing also for many German newspapers and journals.

From 1990 to 1994 he held the chair in East European History at the University of Konstanz, and in October 1994 was appointed to the Chair of East European History at the European University Viadrina in Frankfurt (Emeritus Professor since 2013.) In 2006–2007, he was a Fellow at the Swedish Collegium for Advanced Study in Uppsala, Sweden.

In 2005 Schlögel was awarded the Order of Merit of the Federal Republic of Germany, and in July 2025 it was announced that he would receive the Friedenspreis des Deutschen Buchhandels at the Frankfurt Book Fair in October.

He has been highly critical of Russian annexations of and attacks on Ukrainian territory from 2014 to the present.

On 19 October 2025 Karl Schlögel was awarded the Friedenspreis des Deutschen Buchhandels.

== Work ==
He is the author of numerous highly acclaimed monographs and the winner of the Leipzig Book Fair Prize for non-fiction in 2018 for his most recent work. His earlier work appeared in English in 2012 as Moscow 1937. For this work he received the Preis des Historischen Kollegs in 2016.

== Bibliography ==
In English

- Schlögel, Karl (2012). Moscow, 1937. Cambridge (UK): Polity. ISBN 978-0-7456-5077-7
- Schlögel, Karl (2016). In space we read time: on the history of civilization and geopolitics. New York (N. Y.): Bard Graduate Center. ISBN 978-1-941792-08-7.
- Schlögel, Karl (2018). Ukraine: a nation on the borderland. London: Reaktion Books. ISBN 978-1-78023-978-1.
- Schlögel, Karl (2023). The Soviet century: archaeology of a lost world. Princeton Oxford: Princeton University Press. ISBN 978-0-691-18374-9.
