= Cultural memory =

Topic in cultural studies and historiography

Cultural memory is a form of collective memory shared by a group of people who share a culture. The theory posits that memory is not just an individual, private experience but also part of the collective domain, which both shapes the future and our understanding of the past. It has become a topic in both historiography, which emphasizes the process of forming cultural memory, and cultural studies, which emphasizes the implications and objects of cultural memory.

Two schools of thought have emerged: one articulates that the present shapes our understanding of the past, while the other assumes that the past has an influence on our present behavior. It has, however, been pointed out that these two approaches are not necessarily mutually exclusive.

The idea of cultural memory draws heavily on European social anthropology, especially German and French. It is not well established in the English-speaking world.

== Historiographical approach ==
=== Time ===
Crucial in understanding cultural memory as a phenomenon is the distinction between memory and history. Pierre Nora (1931–2025) put forward this distinction, pinpointing a niche between history and memory.

Scholars disagree as to when to locate the moment representation "took over". Nora points to the formation of European nation states. For Richard Terdiman, the French Revolution is the breaking point: the change of a political system, together with the emergence of industrialization and urbanization, made life more complex than ever before. This not only resulted in an increasing difficulty for people to understand the new society in which they were living, but also, as this break was so radical, people had trouble relating to the past before the revolution. In this situation, people no longer had an implicit understanding of their past. In order to understand the past, it had to be represented through history. As people realized that history was only one version of the past, they became more and more concerned with their own cultural heritage (in French called patrimoine) which helped them shape a collective and national identity. In search for an identity to bind a country or people together, governments have constructed collective memories in the form of commemorations which should bring and keep together minority groups and individuals with conflicting agendas. What becomes clear is that the obsession with memory coincides with the fear of forgetting and the aim for authenticity.

However, more recently questions have arisen whether there ever was a time in which "pure", non-representational memory existed – as Nora in particular put forward. Scholars like Tony Bennett rightly point out that representation is a crucial precondition for human perception in general: pure, organic and objective memories can never be witnessed as such.

=== Space ===
It is because of a sometimes too contracted conception of memory as just a temporal phenomenon, that the concept of cultural memory has often been exposed to misunderstanding. Nora pioneered connecting memory to physical, tangible locations, nowadays globally known and incorporated as lieux de mémoire. He certifies these in his work as mises en abîme; entities that symbolize a more complex piece of our history. Although he concentrates on a spatial approach to remembrance, Nora already points out in his early historiographical theories that memory goes beyond just tangible and visual aspects, thereby making it flexible and in flux. This rather problematic notion, also characterized by Terdiman as the "omnipresence" of memory, implies that for instance on a sensory level, a smell or a sound can become of cultural value, due to its commemorative effect.

Either in visualized or abstracted form, one of the largest complications of memorializing our past is the inevitable fact that it is absent. Every memory we try to reproduce becomes – as Terdiman states – a "present past". This impractical desire for recalling what is gone forever brings to surface a feeling of nostalgia, noticeable in many aspects of daily life but most specifically in cultural products.

== Cultural studies approach ==
=== Embodied memory ===
Recently, interest has developed in the area of 'embodied memory'. According to Paul Connerton the body can also be seen as a container, or carrier of memory, of two different types of social practice; inscribing and incorporating. The former includes all activities which are helpful for storing and retrieving information: photographing, writing, taping, etc. The latter implies skilled performances which are sent by means of physical activity, like a spoken word or a handshake. These performances are accomplished by the individual in an unconscious manner, and one might suggest that this memory carried in gestures and habits, is more authentic than 'indirect' memory via inscribing.

The first conceptions of embodied memory, in which the past is 'situated' in the body of the individual, derive from late nineteenth century thoughts of evolutionists like Jean Baptiste Lamarck and Ernst Haeckel. Lamarck’s law of inheritance of acquired characteristics and Haeckel's theory of ontogeny recapitulating phylogeny, suggested that the individual is a summation of the whole history that had preceded him or her. (However, neither of these concepts is accepted by current science.)

=== Objects ===
Memory can, for instance be contained in objects. Souvenirs and photographs inhabit an important place in the cultural memory discourse. Several authors stress the fact that the relationship between memory and objects has changed since the nineteenth century. Stewart, for example, claims that our culture has changed from a culture of production to a culture of consumption. Products, according to Terdiman, have lost 'the memory of their own process' now, in times of mass-production and commodification. At the same time, he claims, the connection between memories and objects has been institutionalized and exploited in the form of trade in souvenirs. These specific objects can refer to either a distant time (an antique) or a distant (exotic) place. Stewart explains how our souvenirs authenticate our experiences and how they are a survival sign of events that exist only through the invention of narrative.

This notion can easily be applied to another practice that has a specific relationship with memory: photography. Catherine Keenan explains how the act of taking a picture can underline the importance of remembering, both individually and collectively. Also she states that pictures cannot only stimulate or help memory, but can rather eclipse the actual memory – when we remember in terms of the photograph – or they can serve as a reminder of our propensity to forget. Others have argued that photographs can be incorporated in memory and therefore supplement it.

Edward Chaney has coined the term 'Cultural Memorials' to describe both generic types, such as obelisks or sphinxes, and specific objects, such as the Obelisk of Domitian, Abu Simbel or 'The Young Memnon', which have meanings attributed to them that evolve over time. Readings of ancient Egyptian artefacts by Herodotus, Pliny, the Collector Earl of Arundel, 18th-century travellers, Napoleon, Shelley, William Bankes, Harriet Martineau, Florence Nightingale or Sigmund and Lucian Freud, reveal a range of interpretations variously concerned with reconstructing the intentions of their makers. More recently, he has drawn attention to Shakespeare's interest in obelisks (which he calls pyramids), on Elizabethan tombs, including perhaps that of his patron, the 3rd Earl of Southampton.

Historian Guy Beiner argued that "studies of cultural memory tend to privilege literary and artistic representations of the past. As such, they often fail to engage with the social dynamics of memory. Monuments, artworks, novels, poems, plays and countless other productions of cultural memory do not in themselves remember. Their function as aides-mémoire is subject to popular reception. We need to be reminded that remembrance, like trauma, is formulated in human consciousness and that this is shared through social interaction".

== Between culture and memory: experience ==
As a contrast to the sometimes generative nature of previously mentioned studies on cultural memory, an alternative 'school' with its origins in gender and postcolonial studies underscored the importance of the individual and particular memories of those unheard in most collective accounts: women, minorities, homosexuals, etc.

Experience, whether it be lived or imagined, relates mutually to culture and memory. It is influenced by both factors, but determines these at the same time. Culture influences experience by offering mediated perceptions that affect it, as Frigga Haug states by opposing conventional theory on femininity to lived memory.In turn, as historians such as Neil Gregor have argued, experience affects culture, since individual experience becomes communicable and therefore collective. A memorial, for example, can represent a shared sense of loss.

The influence of memory is made obvious in the way the past is experienced in present conditions, for – according to Paul Connerton, for instance – it can never be eliminated from human practice. On the other hand, it is perception driven by a longing for authenticity that colors memory, which is made clear by a desire to experience the real (Susan Stewart). Experience, therefore, is substantial to the interpretation of culture as well as memory, and vice versa.

== Traumatic memory transmission ==
Traumatic transmissions are articulated over time not only through social sites or institutions but also through cultural, political, and familial generations, a key social mechanism of continuity and renewal across human groups, cohorts, and communities. The intergenerational transmission of collective trauma is a well-established phenomenon in the scholarly literature on psychological, familial, sociocultural, and biological modes of transmission. Ordinary processes of remembering and transmission can be understood as cultural practices by which people recognize a lineage, a debt to their past, and through which "they express moral continuity with that past." The intergenerational preservation, transformation, and transmutation of traumatic memory such as of genocide tragic historical legacy can be assimilated, redeemed, and transformed.

== Studies ==
Recent research and theorizing in cultural memory has emphasized the importance of considering the content of cultural identities in understanding the study of social relations and predicting cultural attitudes. For example, researchers compared people's memories for personal events versus collective events for the nation in China and the US. Participants in the US showed a negativity bias in their collective memory--remembering more negative than positive events--but participants in China remembered equal numbers of positive and negative memories. In 2008, the first issue of quarterly journal Memory Studies concerning subjects of and relating to cultural memory was published by SAGE.

== Other approaches ==
Jan Assmann, in his book Cultural Memory and Early Civilization, drew further upon Maurice Halbwachs's theory on collective memory. Other scholars like Andreas Huyssen have identified a general interest in memory and mnemonics since the early 1980s, illustrated by phenomena as diverse as memorials and retro-culture. Some might see cultural memory as becoming more democratic, due to liberalization and the rise of new media. Others see cultural memory as remaining concentrated in the hands of corporations and states.

== See also ==
- Cultural history
- Culture industry
- Culture of Remembrance
- De-commemoration
- Folk memory
- Hauntology
- Identity (social science)
- Memorialization
- National memory
- Philosophy of culture
- Philosophy of history
- Politics of memory
- Popular culture studies
- Roland Barthes
- Social representation
- Vergangenheitsbewältigung
- Visual culture
