= Ottobeuren =

- Municipality
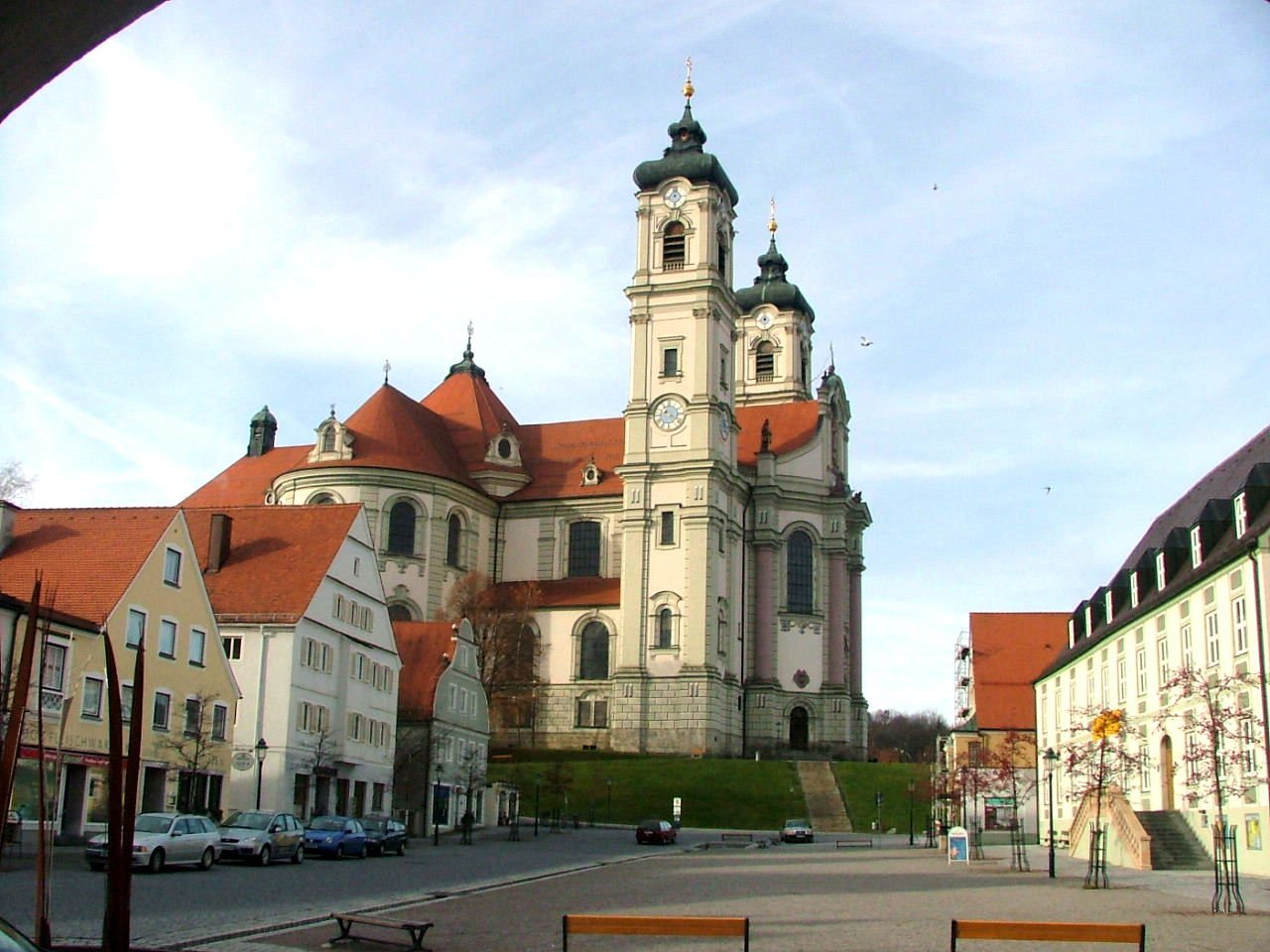
- Basilica and market square in Ottobeuren

- Coat of arms

- Location of Ottobeuren within Unterallgäu district
- Interactive map of Ottobeuren
- Location within Germany Location within Bavaria
- Coordinates: 47°56′29″N 10°17′58″E
- Country: Germany
- State: Bavaria
- Admin. region: Swabia
- District: Unterallgäu
- Municipal assoc.: Ottobeuren

Government
  - Mayor (2020–26): German Fries (FW)

Area
  - Total: 55.85 km^{2} (21.56 sq mi)
- Elevation: 669 m (2,195 ft)

Population (2025-12-31)
  - Total: 8,429
  - Density: 150.9/km^{2} (390.9/sq mi)
- Time zone: UTC+01:00 (CET)
  - Summer (DST): UTC+02:00 (CEST)
- Postal codes: 87724
- Dialling codes: 08332
- Vehicle registration: MN
- Website: www.ottobeuren.de

Ottobeuren (Swabian: Ottobeire, Medieval Latin: Ottobura) is a market town and municipality in Bavaria, Germany, located 11 km southeast of Memmingen near the A7. It is famous for Ottobeuren Abbey, situated next to the Basilica. The town is seat of a municipal association with Hawangen and Böhen.

The musicologist Manfred Hermann Schmid was born in Ottobeuren.

== Twin towns — sister cities ==
Ottobeuren is twinned with:

- Norcia, Italy
- Saint-Donat-sur-l'Herbasse, France
- Tenterfield, New South Wales, Australia
