= Ottobeuren (Verwaltungsgemeinschaft) =

- Verwaltungsgemeinschaft
- Location of Ottobeuren within Unterallgäu district
- Interactive map of Ottobeuren
- Location within Germany Location within Bavaria
- Coordinates: 47°56′N 10°18′E
- Country: Germany
- State: Bavaria
- Admin. region: Swabia
- District: Unterallgäu
- Seat: Ottobeuren
- Subdivisions: 3 municipalities

Area
  - Total: 91.06 km^{2} (35.16 sq mi)

Population (2025-12-31)
  - Total: 10,475
  - Density: 115.0/km^{2} (297.9/sq mi)
- Time zone: UTC+01:00 (CET)
  - Summer (DST): UTC+02:00 (CEST)
- Website: www.ottobeuren.de

Ottobeuren is a Verwaltungsgemeinschaft (municipal association) in the district of Unterallgäu in Bavaria, Germany. Its seat is in Ottobeuren. It consists of the following municipalities:

1. Böhen
2. Hawangen
3. Ottobeuren
