= New German Critique =

- Discipline: German studies
- Language: English

Publication details
- History: 1973 to present
- Publisher: Duke University Press for the Cornell University Department of German Studies (United States)
- Frequency: Triannual

Standard abbreviations
- ISO 4: New Ger. Crit.

Indexing
- ISSN: 0094-033X (print); 1558-1462 (web)
- JSTOR: newgermcrit

Links
- Journal homepage; Duke University Press Online; Journal at Duke University Press

The New German Critique is a contemporary academic journal in German studies. It is associated with the Department of German Studies at Cornell University. It "covers 20th century political and social theory, philosophy, literature, film, media and art, reading cultural texts in the light of current theoretical debates." The executive editors are David Bathrick (Cornell University), Andreas Huyssen (Columbia University), and Anson Rabinbach (Princeton University).

== See also ==
- German studies
