= Hawangen =

- Municipality
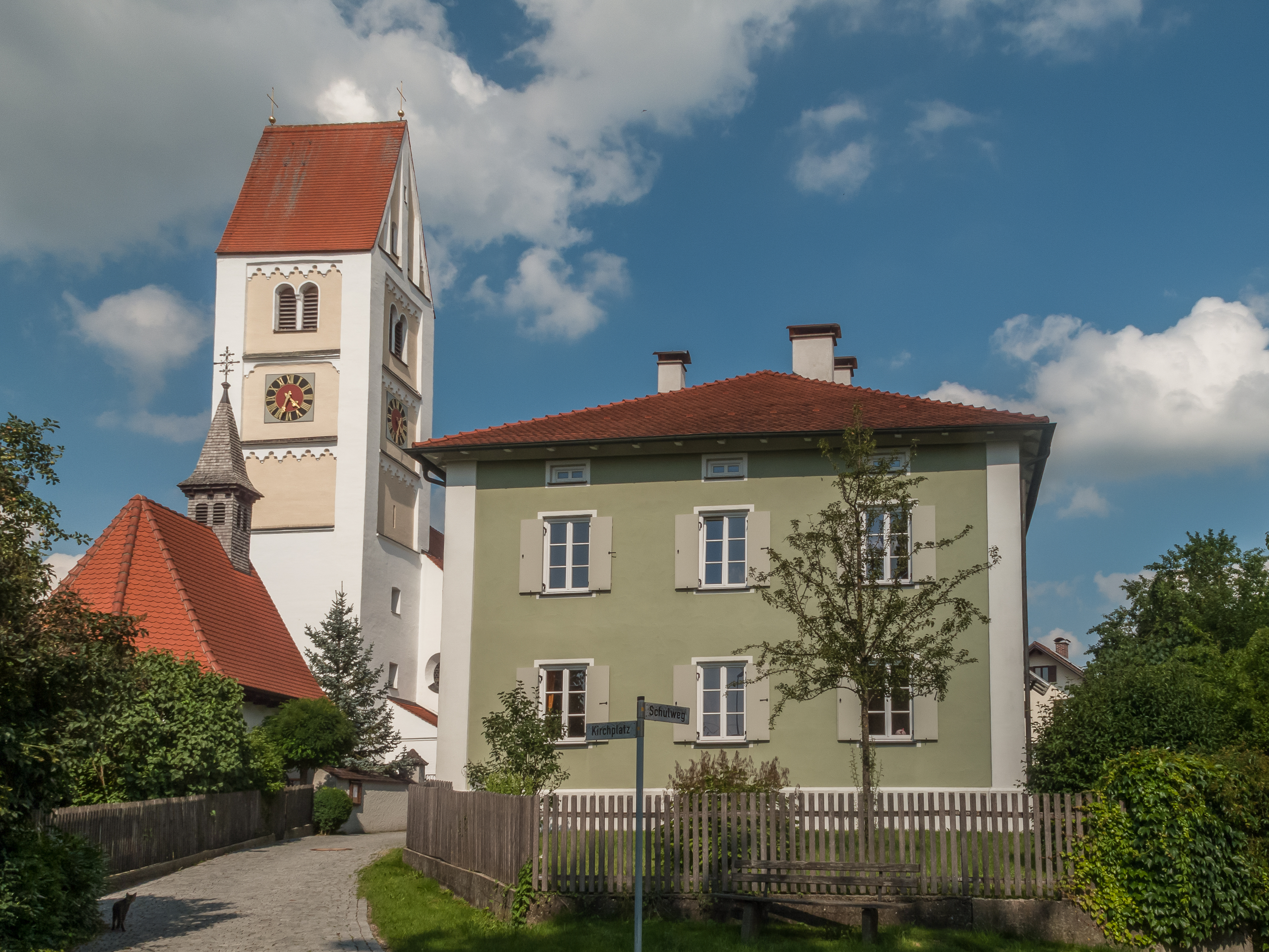
- Catholic parish church of Saint Stephan

- Coat of arms

- Location of Hawangen within Unterallgäu district
- Interactive map of Hawangen
- Location within Germany Location within Bavaria
- Coordinates: 47°58′N 10°16′E
- Country: Germany
- State: Bavaria
- Admin. region: Schwaben
- District: Unterallgäu
- Municipal assoc.: Ottobeuren

Government
  - Mayor (2019–25): Ulrich Ommer (CSU)

Area
  - Total: 14.50 km^{2} (5.60 sq mi)
- Elevation: 637 m (2,090 ft)

Population (2025-12-31)
  - Total: 1,262
  - Density: 87.03/km^{2} (225.4/sq mi)
- Time zone: UTC+01:00 (CET)
  - Summer (DST): UTC+02:00 (CEST)
- Postal codes: 87749
- Dialling codes: 08332
- Vehicle registration: MN
- Website: www.hawangen.de

Hawangen is a municipality in the district of Unterallgäu in Bavaria, Germany, with about 1,254 inhabitants. Hawangen is situated 5 km (3 mi) east of Memmingen. The town has a municipal association with Ottobeuren.
