= Nina Bernstein =

American journalist

- Born: c. 1949 (age 76–77)
- Education: Harvard University
- Occupation: journalist
- Years active: 1986–2016
- Employers: New York Times, New York Newsday
- Known for: reporting on social and legal issues: immigration, child welfare, health care
- Spouse: Andreas Huyssen
- Awards: George Polk Award

Nina Bernstein is an American journalist, best known for her New York Times reporting on social and legal issues, including coverage of immigration, child welfare and health care. In 21 years at the Times, from which she retired at the end of 2016, she was a metro reporter, a national correspondent and an investigative reporter.

In 1995, with three colleagues, she won the George Polk Award for distinguished metropolitan coverage. Immediately after the September 11 attacks she did in-street interviews at locations around Manhattan.

Her reporting on deaths in immigration detention received numerous awards, including the 2010 Paul Tobenkin Memorial Award for courage in journalism awarded by the Columbia School of Journalism, and a 2009 Sidney J. Hillman Award. She was part of a Metro team that won the 2009 Pulitzer Prize for Breaking News for coverage of the scandal that led to the resignation of the governor of New York.

== Life ==
Bernstein graduated from Harvard in 1970 with a B.A. in European history and literature. She worked for newspapers in Milwaukee and Iowa, then was a reporter for New York Newsday for 9 years, including time as a foreign correspondent in Berlin and Bosnia. She joined the Times in 1995.

Bernstein was a Nieman fellow at Harvard in 1983–1984, and in 2002-2003 was a journalism fellow at the American Academy in Berlin. She is the author of The Lost Children of Wilder: The Epic Struggle to Change Foster Care (Pantheon, 2001), which won the Helen Bernstein Award for Excellence in Journalism given by the New York Public Library, and a 2002 PEN America First Nonfiction award. It was also a finalist for the National Book Award and the National Book Critics Award. She has contributed lead chapters to two academic books, Writing Immigration: Scholars and Journalists in Dialogue (University of California Press, 2011), and Challenging Immigration Detention: Academics, Activists and Policy-Makers (Edward Elgar Publishing 2017). She is also the author of a children's book of fiction, Magic by the Book (Farrar, Straus & Giroux, 2005).
