= Die Zauberflöte. Oper und Mysterium =

2005 book by Jan Assmann

- Author: Jan Assmann
- Language: German
- Subject: The Magic Flute
- Publisher: Carl Hanser Verlag
- Publication date: 2005
- Publication place: Germany
- Pages: 384
- ISBN: 3-446-20673-6

Die Zauberflöte. Oper und Mysterium (lit. 'The Magic Flute: Opera and Mystery') is a 2005 book by the German Egyptologist Jan Assmann. It is about the opera The Magic Flute by Emanuel Schikaneder and Wolfgang Amadeus Mozart, especially its connections to the "Egyptomania" of the late 18th century, and the association between mystery religions and rationalistic-utopian political ideas within Viennese Freemasonry and the Austrian Enlightenment.

The book was nominated for the 2006 Leipzig Book Fair Prize.
