= Memory Studies (journal) =

- Discipline: Sociology
- Language: English
- Edited by: Andrew Hoskins

Publication details
- History: 2008-present
- Publisher: SAGE Publications
- Frequency: Quarterly
- Impact factor: 1.070 (2011)

Standard abbreviations
- ISO 4: Mem. Stud.

Indexing
- ISSN: 1750-6980 (print); 1750-6999 (web)
- LCCN: 2008228760
- OCLC no.: 213356662

Links
- Journal homepage; Online access; Online archive

Memory Studies is a quarterly peer-reviewed academic journal that covers the study of "the social, cultural, political and technical shifts affecting how, what and why individuals, groups and societies remember and forget". The journal's editors-in-chief are Andrew Hoskins (University of Glasgow), Amanda Barnier (Macquarie University), Wulf Kansteiner (Aarhus Universitet, Denmark), and John Sutton (Macquarie University). It was established in 2008 and is currently published by SAGE Publications.

== Abstracting and indexing ==
Memory Studies is abstracted and indexed in:

- Scopus
- Social Sciences Citation Index
- ZETOC
