= Karl Friedrich Hermann =

German classical scholar (1804–1855)

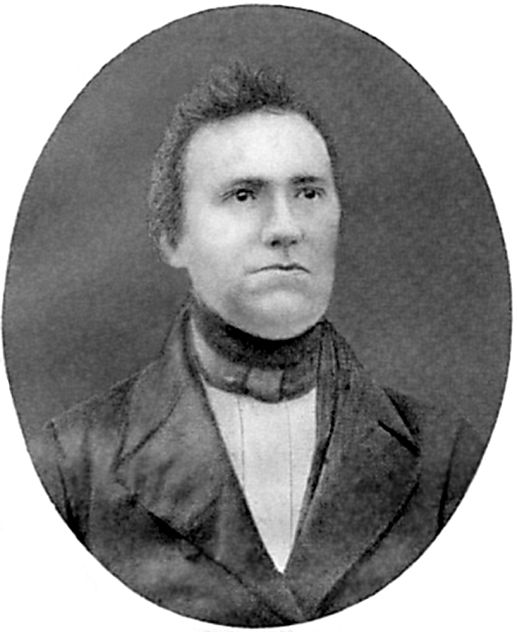
- Born: 4 August 1804; Frankfurt-am-Main
- Died: 31 December 1855 (aged 51); Göttingen
- Occupations: Philology, Archaeology

Karl Friedrich Hermann (4 August 1804 – 31 December 1855) was a German classical scholar and antiquary.

== Biography ==
He was born at Frankfurt-am-Main. Having studied philosophy at the universities of Heidelberg and Leipzig (and taking a degree in 1824), he went on a tour of Italy; on his return from which he lectured as privatdozent in Heidelberg. In 1832 he was appointed professor of classical philology at the University of Marburg, and in 1833 received the additional offices of second librarian at the university, and director of the philological seminary. In 1842 he transferred to Göttingen as the chair of philology and archaeology, vacant by the death of Otfried Müller. At Göttingen, his colleagues were Friedrich Wilhelm Schneidewin, Ernst von Leutsch and Friedrich Wieseler.

== Works ==
His knowledge of all branches of classical learning was profound, but he was chiefly distinguished for his works on Greek antiquities and ancient philosophy. Among these may be mentioned, the Lehrbuch der griechischen Antiquitäten (1858) dealing with political, religious and domestic antiquities; the Geschichte und System der Platonischen Philosophie (1839), unfinished; an edition of the Platonis Dialogi ("Platonic dialogues"), 6 volumes, (1851–1853); and Culturgeschichte der Griechen und Römer (1857), published after his death by Karl Gustav Schmidt. He also edited the text of Juvenal and Persius (1854) and Lucian's De conscribenda historia (1828). A collection of Abhandlungen und Beiträge appeared in 1849.
