= Encyclopedism =

School of thought favoring compiling all human knowledge in one source

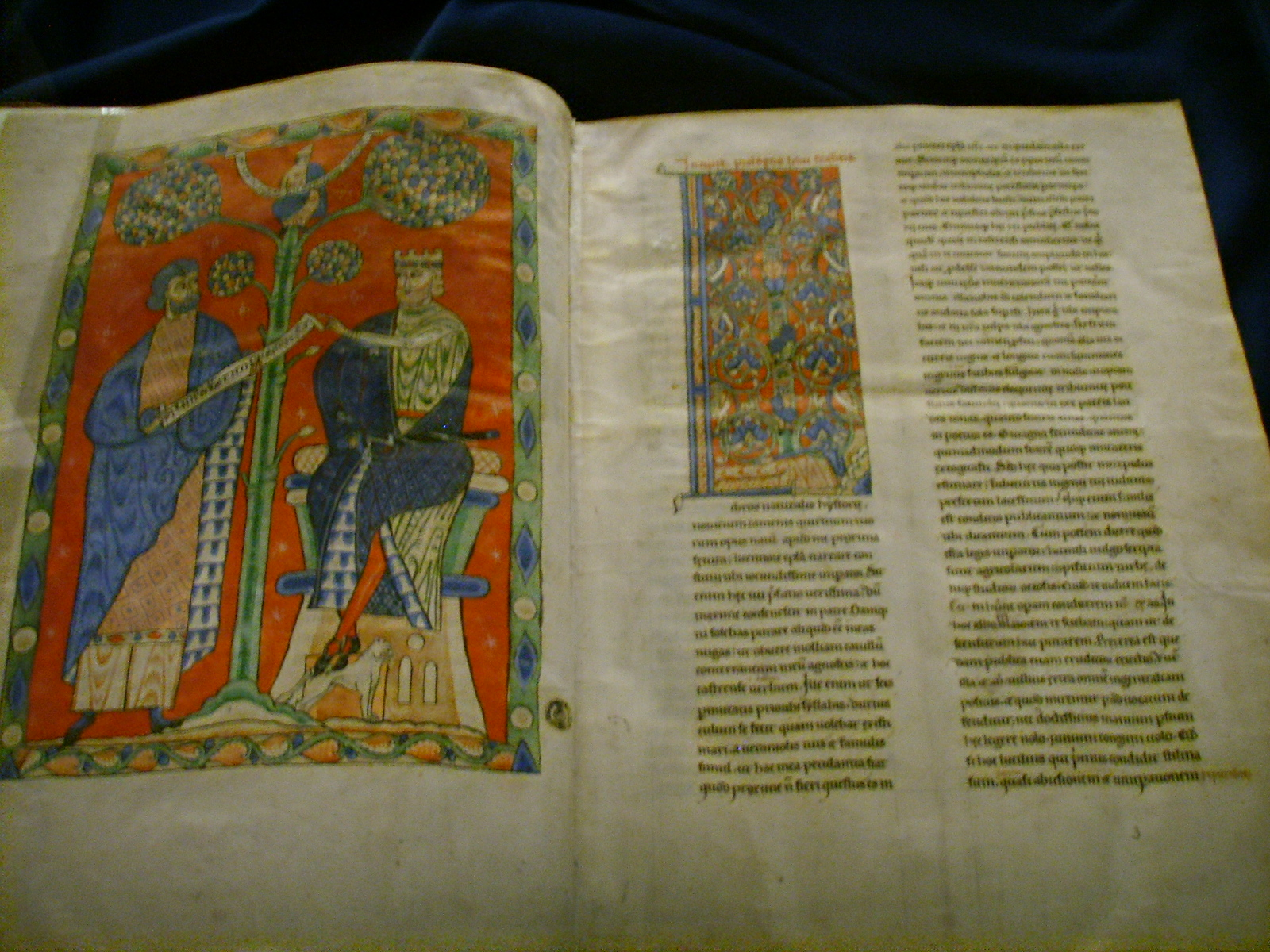
Natural History, written by Pliny the Elder in the first century, was the first book to be called an encyclopedia. It was highly regarded in the Middle Ages. This profusely illustrated manuscript was produced in the 13th century.

Encyclopedism is an outlook that aims to include a wide range of knowledge in a single work. The term covers both encyclopedias themselves and related genres in which comprehensiveness is a notable feature. The word encyclopedia is a Latinization of the Greek enkýklios paideía, which means all-around education. The encyclopedia is "one of the few generalizing influences in a world of overspecialization. It serves to recall that knowledge has unity," according to Louis Shores, editor of Collier's Encyclopedia. It should not be "a miscellany, but a concentration, a clarification, and a synthesis", according to British writer H. G. Wells.

Besides comprehensiveness, encyclopedic writing is distinguished by its lack of a specific audience or practical application. The author explains facts concisely for the benefit of a reader who will then use the information in a way that the writer does not try to anticipate. Early examples of encyclopedic writing include discussions of agriculture and craft by Roman writers such as Pliny the Elder and Varro – discussions presumably not intended as practical advice to farmers or craftsmen.

A great deal of classical learning was lost during the Dark Ages. This enhanced the status of encyclopedic works which survived, including those of Aristotle and Pliny. With the development of printing in the 15th century, the range of knowledge available to readers expanded greatly. Encyclopedic writing became both a practical necessity and a clearly distinguished genre. Renaissance encyclopedists were keenly aware of how much classical learning had been lost. They hoped to recover and record knowledge and were anxious to prevent further loss.

In their modern form, encyclopedias consist of alphabetized articles written by teams of specialists. This format was developed in the 18th century by expanding the technical dictionary to include non-technical topics. The Encyclopédie (1751–1772), edited by Diderot and D'Alembert, was a model for many later works. Like Renaissance encyclopedists, Diderot worried about the possible destruction of civilization and selected knowledge he hoped would survive.

== Etymology ==
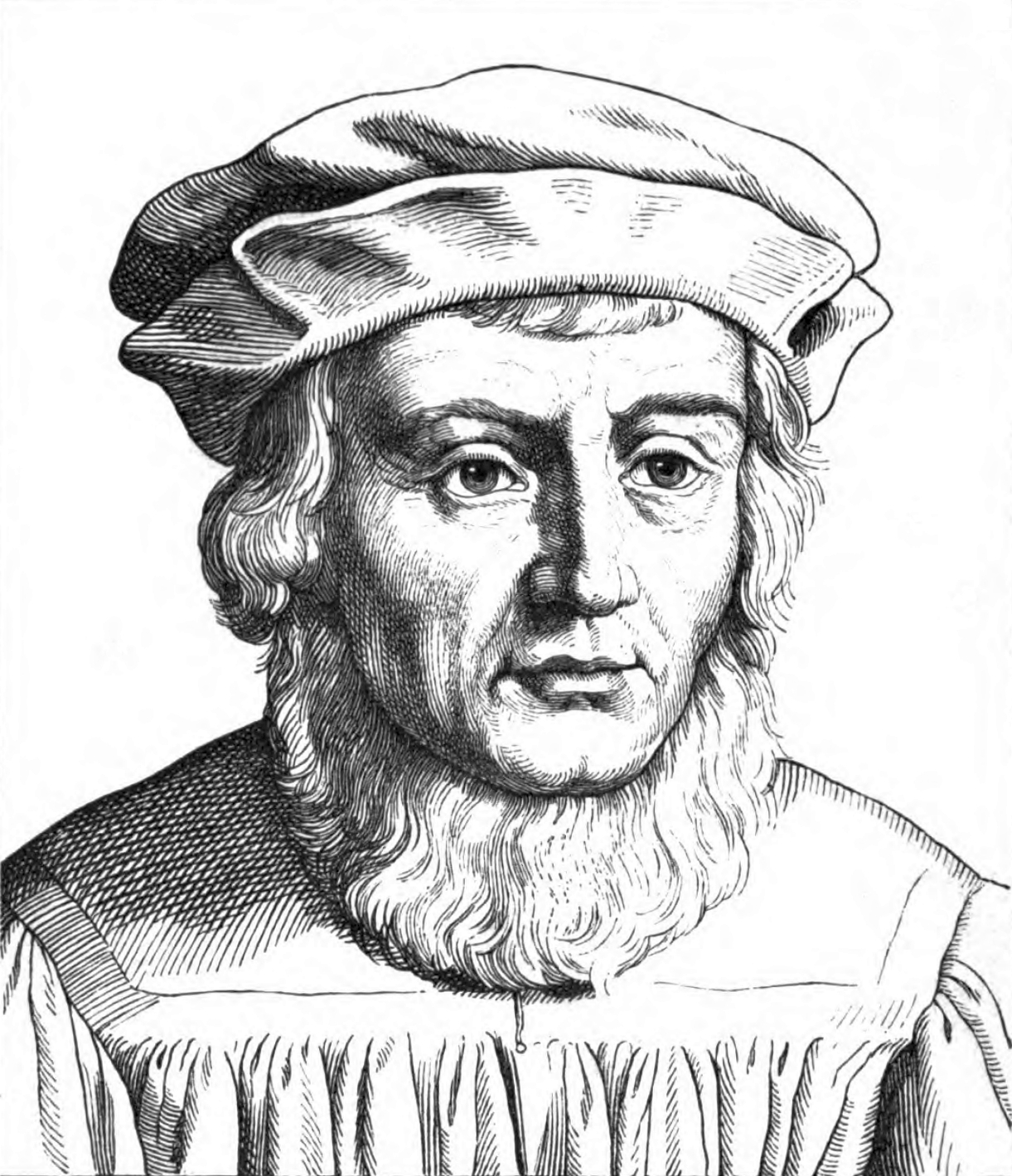
In 1517, Bavarian Johannes Aventinus wrote the first book that used the word "encyclopedia" in the title.

The word "encyclopedia" is a Latinization of the Greek enkýklios paideía. The Greek phrase refers to the education that a well-round student should receive. Latin writer Quintilian uses it to refer to the subjects a student of oratory should be familiar with before beginning an apprenticeship. It translates literally as "in (en) the circle (kýklios) of knowledge (paideía)." The earliest citation for "encyclopedia" given in Oxford English Dictionary refers to the Greek curriculum and is dated 1531.

The use of the term to refer to a genre of literature was prompted by a line that Pliny used in the preface of Natural History: "My object is to treat of all those things which the Greeks include in the Encyclopædia [tē̂s enkyklíou paideías], which, however, are either not generally known or are rendered dubious from our ingenious conceits." Pliny writes the relevant phrase using Greek letters. Latin printers of incunabula lacked the typeface to render it. Some printers substituted encyclopædia or another Latin phrase. Others just left a blank space. This led to the misunderstanding that Pliny had called his work an encyclopedia.

In the Renaissance, writers who wanted their work compared to that of Pliny used the word. In 1517, Bavarian Johannes Aventinus wrote Encyclopedia orbisqve doctrinarum, a Latin reference work. Ringelberg's Cyclopedia was published in 1541 and Paul Scalich's Encyclopedia in 1559. Both of these reference works were written in Latin. The French Encyclopédistes popularized the word in the 18th century.

The Oxford English Dictionary's first citation of "encyclopedism" is dated 1833. The context is a book on Diderot.

== History ==
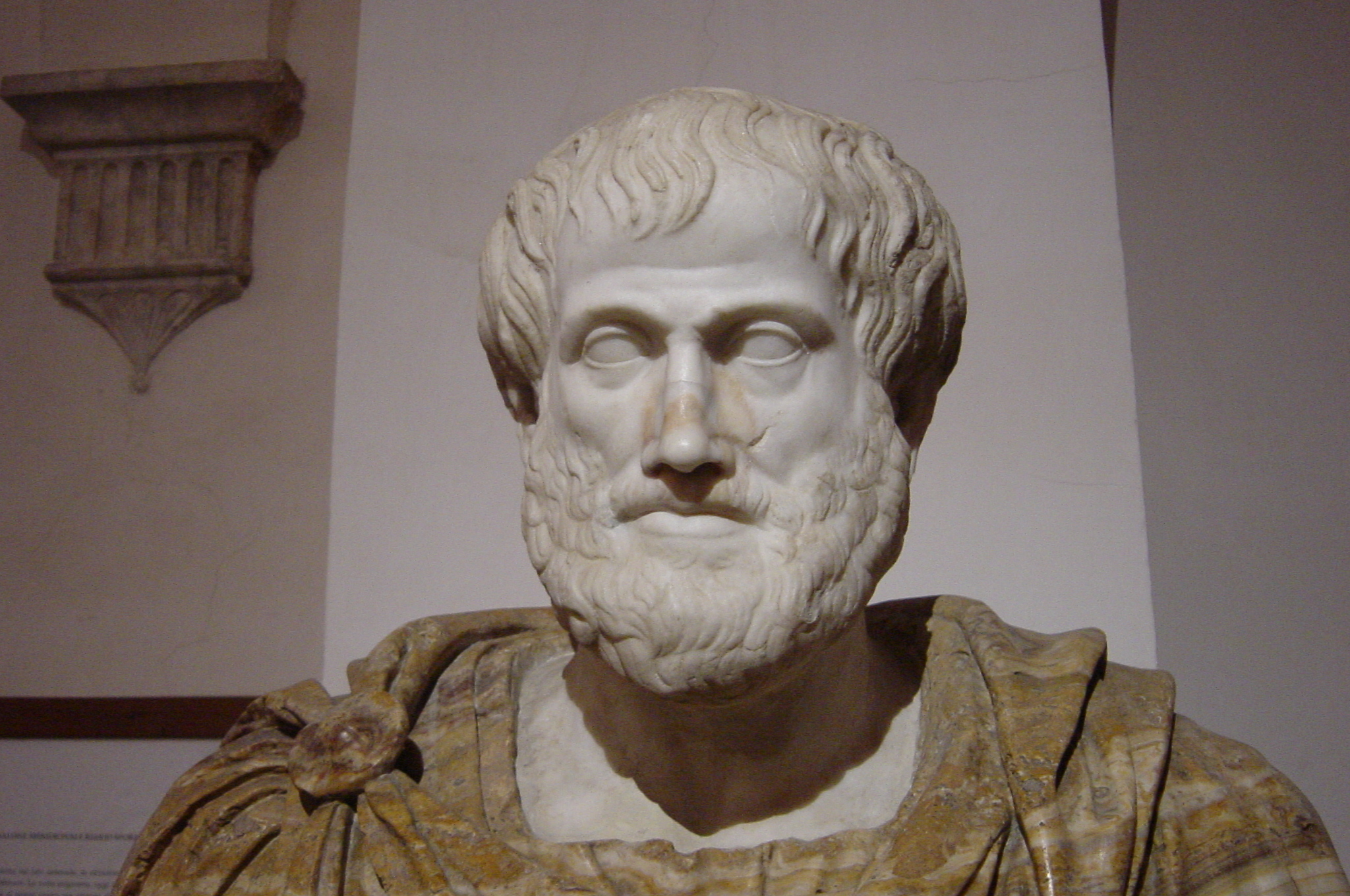
In the 4th century BC, Aristotle wrote on a broad range of topics and explained how knowledge can be classified.

=== Aristotle ===
The Greek writer and teacher Aristotle (384–322 BC) had much to say on a broad range of subjects, including biology, anatomy, psychology, physics, meteorology, zoology, poetics, rhetoric, logic, epistemology, metaphysics, ethics, and political thought. He was among the first writers to describe how to classify material by subject, the first step in writing an encyclopedia. Aristotle wrote to help his students follow his teaching, so his corpus did not much resemble an encyclopedia during his lifetime. Long after his death, commentators filled in the gaps, reordered his works, and put his writing in a systematic form. Catalogs of his work were produced by Andronicus in the first century and by Ptolemy in the second century. As Aristotle's corpus was one of the few encyclopedic works to survive the Middle Ages, it became a widely used reference work in late medieval and Renaissance times.

=== Alexandria ===
Dorotheus (mid first century AD) and Pamphilus (late first century AD) both wrote enormous lexicons. Neither work has survived, but their lengths suggest that they were considerably more than just dictionaries. Pamphilus's work was 95 books long and was a sequel to a lexicon of four books by Zopyrion. This passage from the Souda suggests that it was made up of alphabetized entries:

Pamphilus, of Alexandria, a grammarian of the school of Aristarchus. He wrote A Meadow, which is a summary of miscellaneous contents. On rare words; i.e. vocabulary in 95 books (it contains entries from epsilon to omega, because Zopyrion had done letters alpha to delta.) On unexplained matters in Nicander and the so called Optica; Art of Criticism and a large number of other grammatical works.

Hesychius (fifth century) credits Diogenianus as a source, who in turn used Pamphilus. This is the only form in which any of Pamphilus's work may have survived.

=== Rome ===
A Roman who wanted to learn about a certain subject would send a slave to a private library with orders to copy relevant passages from whatever books were available. As they were less likely to withdraw or buy a book, readers were little concerned with the scope of a given work. So the emergence of encyclopedic writing cannot be explained by practical need. Instead, it may have been inspired by Cato's ideal of the vir bonus, the informed citizen able to participate in the life of the Republic.

Three Roman works are commonly identified as encyclopedic: The collected works of Varro (116–27 BC), Pliny the Elder's (c. 77–79 AD) Natural History, and On the Arts by Cornelius Celsus (c. 25 BC – c. 50 AD). These three were grouped together as a genre, not by the Romans themselves, but by later writers in search of antique precedent.

In Cicero's time, the study of literature was still controversial. In Pro Archia, Cicero explains that he studied literature to improve his rhetorical skills and because it provides a source of elevating moral examples. Varro's emphasis on the city's history and culture suggests patriotic motives. Pliny emphasized utilitarian motives and public service. He criticized Livy for writing history simply for his own pleasure.

==== Varro ====
Varro's Antiquities consisted of 41 books on Roman history. His Disciplines was nine books on liberal arts. Varro also wrote 25 books on Latin and 15 on law. Only fragments of Varro's work survive. According to Cicero, Varro's comprehensive work allowed the Romans to feel at home in their own city.

==== Cornelius Celsus ====
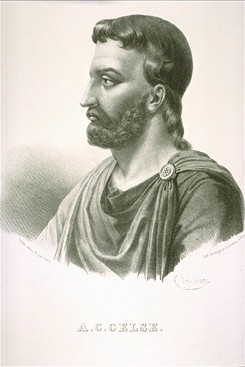
Cornelius Celsus wrote prolifically on various topics in first century Rome. He knew "all things," according to a tribute by Quintilian. Only his work on medicine survives.

Celsus wrote prolifically on many subjects. "Cornelius Celsus, a man of modest intellect, could write not only about all these arts but also left behind accounts of military science, agriculture, and medicine: indeed, he deserves, on the basis on this design alone, to be thought to have known all things," according to Quintilian. Only the medical section of his massive On the Arts has survived. This is eight books long. Celsus followed the structure of the medical writers that had gone before him. He summarized their views in a workmanlike manner. He seldom presented insights of his own. He struggled to manage the overwhelming quantity of relevant source material. His medical books were rediscovered in 1426-1427 at libraries in the Vatican and in Florence and published in 1478. He is our main source concerning Roman medical practices.

==== Pliny the Elder ====
If Varro made the Romans feel at home their own city, Pliny tried to do the same for the natural world and for the Empire. Pliny's approach was very different than that of Celsus. He was a man ahead of his time. Not content to build on what went before, he reorganized the world of knowledge to fit his encyclopedic vision. In a Latin preface, the writer customarily listed the models he hoped to surpass. Pliny found no model in previous writing. Instead, he emphasized that his work was novicium (new), a word suitable for describing a major discovery. Although Pliny was widely read, no later Roman writer followed his structure or claimed him as a model. Niccolò Leoniceno published an essay in 1492 listing Pliny's many scientific errors.

In the introduction of Natural History, Pliny writes:

... in Thirty-six Books I have comprised 20,000 Things that are worthy of Consideration, and these I have collected out of about 2000 Volumes that I have diligently read (and of which there are few that Men otherwise learned have ventured to meddle with, for the deep Matter therein contained), and those written by one hundred several excellent Authors; besides a Multitude of other Matters, which either were unknown to our former Writers, or Experience has lately ascertained.

With an entire book dedicated to listing sources, Natural History is 37 books long. (It's 10 volumes in the modern translation.) Eschewing established disciplines and categories, Pliny begins with a general description of the world. Book 2 covers astronomy, meteorology, and the elements. Books 3–6 cover geography. Humanity is covered in Book 7, animals in Books 8–11, trees in 12–17, agriculture in 18–19, medicine in 20–32, metals in 33–34, and craft and art in 35–37.

Following Aristotle, Pliny counts four elements: fire, earth, air and water. There are seven planets: Saturn, Jupiter, Mars ("of a fiery and burning nature"), the Sun, Venus, Mercury, and the Moon ("the last of the stars"). The earth is a "perfect globe," suspended in the middle of space, that rotates with incredible swiftness once every 24 hours. As a good Stoic, Pliny dismisses astrology: "it is ridiculous to suppose, that the great head of all things, whatever it be, pays any regard to human affairs." He considers the possibility of other worlds ("there will be so many suns and so many moons, and that each of them will have immense trains of other heavenly bodies") only to dismiss such speculation as "madness." The idea of space travel is "perfect madness."

Pliny had opinions on a wide variety of subjects often interjected them. He tells us which uses of plants, animals, and stone are proper, and which ones are improper. Was the Roman Empire benefiting or corrupting the classical world? Pliny returns to this theme repeatedly. He analogizes Rome's civilizing mission to the way poisonous plants of all nation were tamed into medicines. Pliny also wants us to know that he is a heroic explorer, a genius responsible for a highly original and most remarkable work. The extensive reading and note taking of his slave secretaries is rarely mentioned.

At the very end of the work, Pliny writes, "Hail Nature, parent of all things, and in recognition of the fact that I alone have praised you in all your manifestations, look favorably upon me." Here Pliny points to comprehensiveness as his project's outstanding asset. Nature awarded Pliny a heroic death that gave him "a kind of eternal life," according to his nephew. The great encyclopedist was commander of the Naples fleet and died trying to assist the local inhabitants during the eruption of Vesuvius in AD 79.

=== China ===
The nearest Chinese equivalent to an encyclopedia is the leishu. These consist of extensive quotations arranged by category. The earliest known Chinese encyclopedia is Huang Lan (Emperor's mirror), produced around 220 under the Wei dynasty. No copy has survived. The best-known leishu are those of Li Fang (925–996), who wrote three such works during the Song dynasty. These three were later combined with a fourth work, Cefu Yuangui, to create Four Great Books of Song.

=== The Middle Ages ===
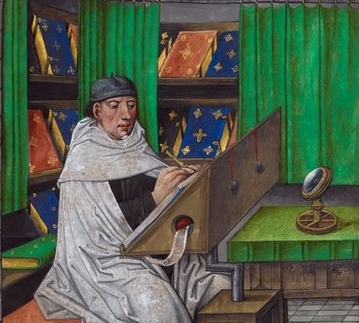
Vincent of Beauvais (c. 1190 – 1264?) was one of the best-known encyclopedists of the medieval period. This illustration is from a 15th-century French translation of his work.

While classical and modern encyclopedic writers sought to distribute knowledge, those of the Middle Ages were more interested in establishing orthodoxy. They produced works to be used as educational texts in schools and universities. Students could consider the knowledge within them as safely orthodox and thus be kept from heresy. Limiting knowledge was an important part of their function.

As a Stoic, Pliny began with astronomy and ended with the fine arts. Cassiodorus attempted to write a Christian equivalent to Pliny's work. His Institutiones (560) begins with discussions of scripture and the church. Other subjects are treated briefly toward the end of the work. With onset of the Dark Ages, access to Greek learning and literacy in Greek declined. The works of Boethius (c. 480–524) filled the gap by compiling Greek handbooks and summarizing their content in Latin. These works served as general purpose references in the early Middle Ages.

The Etymologies (c. 600–625) by Isidore of Seville consisted of extracts from earlier writers. Three of the Isidore's twenty books represent material from Pliny. Isidore was the most widely read and fundamental text in terms of medieval encyclopedic writing.

These early medieval writers organized their material in the form of a trivium (grammar, logic, rhetoric) followed by a quadrivium (geometry, arithmetic, astronomy, music). This division of seven liberal arts was a feature of monastic education as well as the medieval universities, which developed beginning in the 12th century.

From the fourth to the ninth centuries, Byzantium experienced a series of religious debates. As part of these debates, excerpts were compiled and organized thematically to support the theological views of the compiler. Once orthodoxy was established, the energy of the compilation tradition transferred to other subjects. The tenth century, or Macedonian dynasty, saw a flowering of encyclopedic writing. The Suda is believed to have been compiled at this time. This is the earliest work that a modern reader would recognize as an encyclopedia. It contains 30,000 alphabetized entries. The Suda is not mentioned until the 12th century, and it might have been put together in stages.

The most massive encyclopedia of the Middle Ages was Speculum Maius (The Great Mirror) by Vincent of Beauvais. It was 80 books long and was completed in 1244. With a total of 4.5 million words, the work is presumably the product of an anonymous team. (By comparison, the current edition of Britannica has 44 million words.) It was divided into three sections. "Naturale" covered God and the natural world; "Doctrinale" covered language, ethics, crafts, medicine; and "Historiale" covered world history. Vincent had great respect for classical writers such Aristotle, Cicero, and Hippocrates. The encyclopedia shows a tendency toward "exhaustiveness," or systemic plagiarism, typical of the medieval period. Vincent was used as a source by Chaucer. The full version of Speculum proved to be too long to circulate in the era of manuscripts and manual copying. However, an abridged version by Bartholomeus Anglicus did enjoy a wide readership.

The Arab counterpart to these works was Kitab al-Fehrest by Ibn al-Nadim.

=== Renaissance ===
With the advent of printing and a dramatic reduction in paper costs, the volume of encyclopedic writing exploded in the Renaissance. This was an age of "info-lust" and enormous compilations. Many compilers cited the fear of a traumatic loss of knowledge to justify their efforts. They were keenly aware of how much classical learning had been lost in the Dark Ages. Pliny was their model. His axiom that, "there is no book so bad that some good cannot be got from it" was a favorite. Conrad Gesner listed over 10,000 books in Bibliotheca universalis (1545). By including both Christian and barbarian works, Gesner rejected the medieval quest for orthodoxy. Ironically, Jesuit Antonio Possevino used Bibliotheca universalis as a basis to create a list of forbidden books.

==== England ====
The invention of printing helped spread new ideas, but also revived old misconceptions. Printers of incunabulia were eager to publish books, both ancient and modern. The best-known encyclopedia of Elizabethan England was Batman upon Bartholomew, published in 1582. This book is based on a work compiled by Bartholomaeus Anglicus in the 13th century. It was translated by John Trevisa in 1398, revised by Thomas Berthelet in 1535, and revised again by Stephen Batman. In Shakespeare's day, it represented a worldview already four centuries old, only modestly updated. Yet several ideas inspired by Batman can be found in Shakespeare. The idea that the rays of the moon cause madness can be found Measure for Measure and Othello, hence the word "lunacy." The discussion of the geometric properties of the soul in King Lear is likely to reflect the influence of Batman as well. An encyclopedia that Shakespeare consulted more obviously than Batman is French Academy by Pierre de la Primaudaye. Primaudaye was much taken with analogies, some of which have found their way into Shakespeare: the unweeded garden, death as an unknown country, and the world as a stage. (Various other sources have also been suggested for the last analogy.) Both Batman and Primaudaye were Protestant.

Francis Bacon wrote a plan for an encyclopedia in Instauratio magna (1620). He drew up a checklist of the major areas of knowledge a complete encyclopedia needed to contain. Bacon's plan influenced Diderot and thus indirectly later encyclopedias, which generally follow Diderot's scheme.

=== The Enlightenment ===
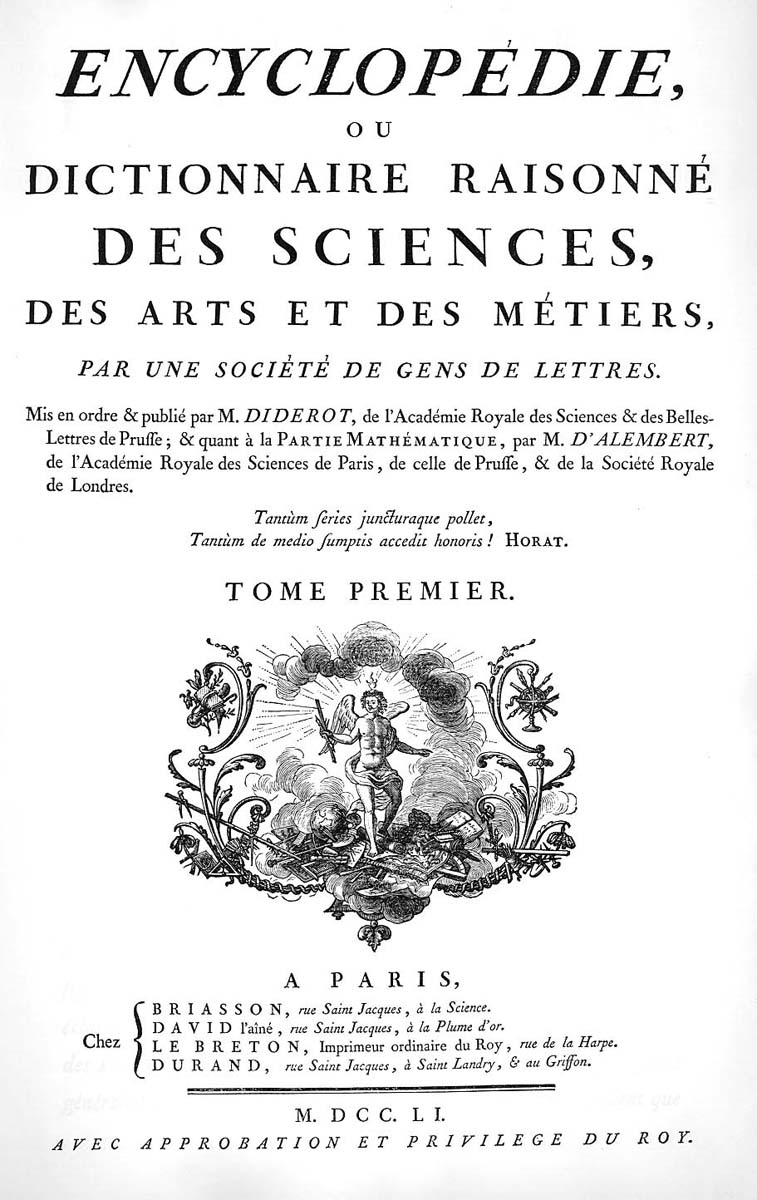
Encyclopédie (1751–1777), edited by Diderot and D'Alembert, was greatly admired and a model for many subsequent works.

While ancient and medieval encyclopedism emphasized the classics, liberal arts, informed citizenship, or law, the modern encyclopedia springs from a separate tradition. The advance of technology meant that there was much unfamiliar terminology to explain. John Harris's Lexicon Technicum (1704) proclaims itself, "An Universal English Dictionary of Arts and Sciences: Explaining not only the Terms of Art, but the Arts Themselves." This was the first alphabetical encyclopedia written in English. Harris's work inspired Ephraim Chambers's Cyclopedia (1728). Chambers's two-volume work is considered the first modern encyclopedia.

Encyclopédie (1751–1777) was a massively expanded version of Chambers's idea. This 32-volume work, edited by Diderot and D'Alembert, was the pride of Enlightenment France. It consisted of 21 volumes of text and 11 volumes of illustrations. There were 74,000 articles written by more than 130 contributors. It presented a secular worldview, drawing the ire of several Church officials. It sought to empower its readers with knowledge and played a role in fomenting the dissent that led to the French Revolution. Diderot explained the project this way:

This is a work that cannot be completed except by a society of men of letters and skilled workmen, each working separately on his own part, but all bound together solely by their zeal for the best interests of the human race and a feeling of mutual good will.

This realization that no one person, not even a genius like Pliny assisted by slave secretaries, could produce a work of the comprehensiveness required, is the mark of the modern era of encyclopedism.

Diderot's project was a great success and inspired several similar projects, including Britain's Encyclopædia Britannica (first edition, 1768) as well as Germany's Brockhaus Enzyklopädie (beginning 1808). Enlightenment encyclopedias also inspired authors and editors to undertake or critique "encyclopedic" knowledge projects in other genres and formats: the 65-volume Universal History (Sale et al) (1747-1768), for example, far exceeded its predecessors in terms of scope, and The General Magazine of Arts and Sciences (1755-1765) published by Benjamin Martin (lexicographer) sought to bring encyclopedism to the monthly periodical. A loyal subscriber, he wrote, would “be allowed to make a great Proficiency, if he can make himself Master of the useful Arts and Sciences in the Compass of Ten Years.” In Laurence Sterne's The Life and Opinions of Tristram Shandy, Gentleman (1759-1767), the title character satirically refers to his fictional autobiography as a “cyclopædia of arts and sciences." Such "experiments in encyclopedism" demonstrate the widespread literary and cultural influence of the form in the 18th century.

=== The 19th and 20th centuries ===
Once solely for society's elites, in the 19th and 20th centuries encyclopedias were increasingly written, marketed to, and purchased by middle and working class households. Different styles of encyclopedism emerged which would target particular age groups, presenting the works as educational tools—even made available through payment plans advertised on TV.

One of the earliest individuals to advocate for a technologically enhanced encyclopedia indexing all the world's information was H. G. Wells. Inspired by the possibilities of microfilm, he put forward his idea of a global encyclopedia in the 1930s through a series of international talks and his essay World Brain.

It would be another several decades before the earliest electronic encyclopedias were published in the 1980s and 1990s. The production of electronic encyclopedias began as conversions of printed work, but soon added multimedia elements, requiring new methods of content gathering and presentation. Early applications of hypertext similarly had a great benefit to readers but did not require significant changes in writing. The launching of Wikipedia in the 2000s and its subsequent rise in popularity and influence, however, radically altered popular conception of the ways in which an encyclopedia is produced (collaboratively, openly) and consumed (ubiquitously). In addition, Wikipedia's success inspired the launching of other, more specialized wiki websites on various wiki server software platforms.
