= Eilhard Mitscherlich =

German chemist (1794–1863)

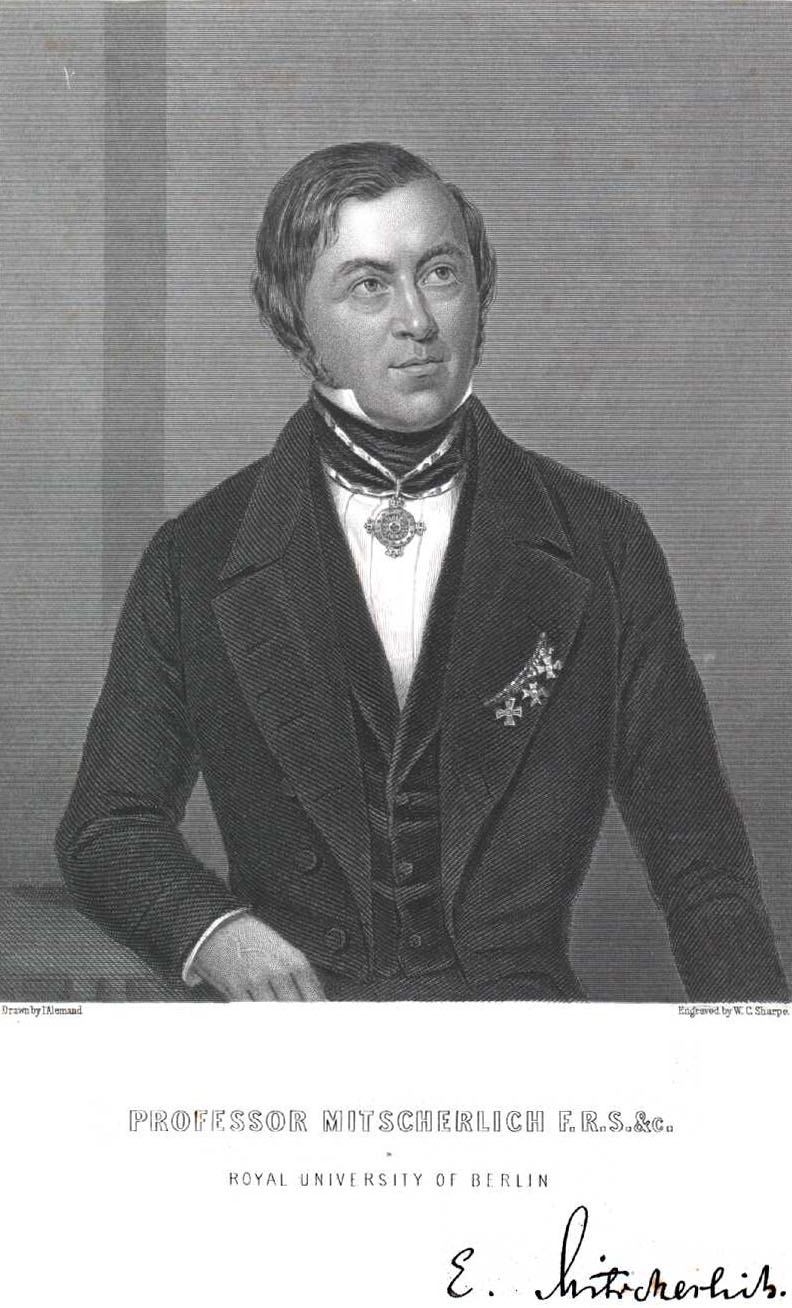
- Eilhard Mitscherlich (1794–1863)
- Born: 7 January 1794; Neuende, Lordship of Jever
- Died: 28 August 1863 (aged 69); Schöneberg, Prussia
- Education: University of Göttingen; University of Berlin; Stockholm University
- Known for: Mitscherlich's law Mitscherlichite; Azobenzene; Goniometer; Selenic acid
- Awards: Pour le Mérite for Sciences and Arts (1842); Royal Medal (1829); ForMemRS (1828)
- Scientific career
- Fields: Chemist
- Workplaces: University of Berlin
- Doctoral advisor: Friedrich Stromeyer
- Doctoral students: Heinrich Gustav Magnus

Eilhard Mitscherlich (German pronunciation: [ˈaɪlhaʁt ˈmɪtʃɐlɪç]; 7 January 1794 – 28 August 1863) was a German chemist, who is perhaps best remembered today for his discovery of the phenomenon of crystallographic isomorphism in 1819.

== Early life and work ==
Mitscherlich was born at Neuende (now a part of Wilhelmshaven) in the Lordship of Jever, where his father was pastor. His uncle, Christoph Wilhelm Mitscherlich (1760–1854), professor at the University of Göttingen, was in his day a celebrated scholar. Eilhard Mitscherlich was educated at Jever by the historian Friedrich Christoph Schlosser, and in 1811 went to the University of Heidelberg devoting himself to philology, with an emphasis on the Persian language. In 1813 he went to Paris to seek permission to join the embassy which Napoleon I of France was establishing in Persia.

The abdication of Napoleon Bonaparte in 1814 put an end to this, and Mitscherlich resolved to study medicine in order that he might enjoy that freedom of travel usually allowed in the East to physicians. He began at Göttingen with the study of chemistry, and this so arrested his attention that he gave up his idea of traveling to Persia. From his days in Göttingen dates the treatise on certain parts of Eurasian history, compiled from manuscripts found in the university library and published in Persian and Latin in 1814, under the title Mirchondi historia Thaheridarum historicis nostris hucusque incognitorum Persiae principum.

In 1818 Mitscherlich went to Berlin and worked in the laboratory of Heinrich Friedrich Link (1767–1851). There he studied phosphates, phosphites, arsenates and arsenites, and was able to confirm the conclusions of Jöns Jakob Berzelius as to their composition. His observation that corresponding phosphates and arsenates crystallize in the same form was the germ from which grew his theory of isomorphism (crystallography), which theory was published in the proceedings of the Berlin Academy of Sciences in December 1819. In that same year Berzelius suggested Mitscherlich to the Prussian education minister Karl vom Stein zum Altenstein as successor to Martin Heinrich Klaproth at the University of Berlin. Altenstein did not immediately carry out this suggestion, but he obtained for Mitscherlich a government grant to enable him to continue his studies in Berzelius' laboratory at the Karolinska Institutet in Stockholm. Mitscherlich returned to Berlin in 1821, and in the summer of 1822 he delivered his first lecture as extraordinary professor of chemistry at the university; in 1825 he was appointed ordinary professor. In 1823 Mitscherlich was elected as foreign member of the Royal Swedish Academy of Sciences.

== Isomorphism ==
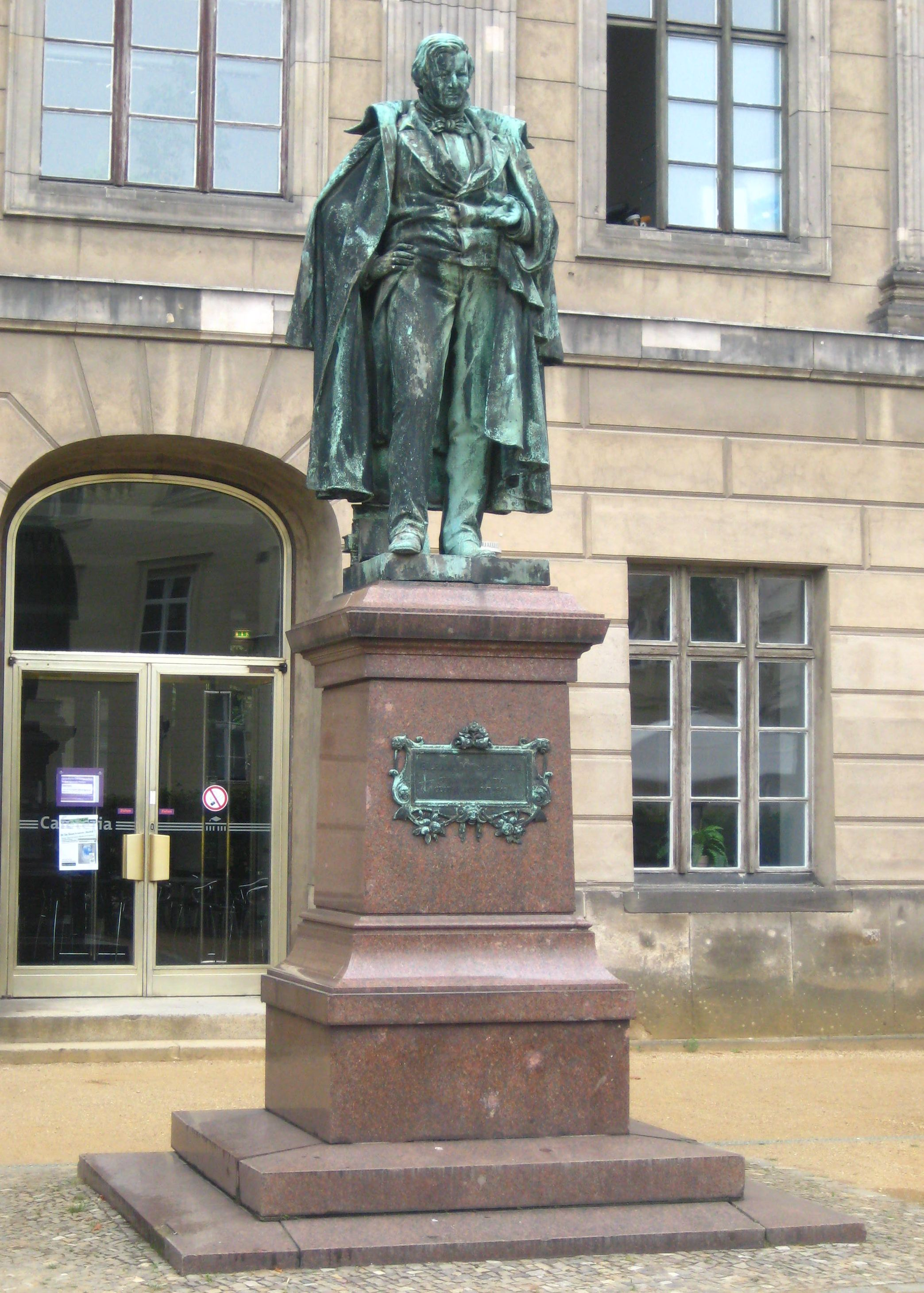
Bronze statue of Mitscherlich at the Humboldt University of Berlin

In the course of investigating the slight differences discovered by William Hyde Wollaston in the angles of the rhombohedra of the carbonates isomorphous with calcite, Mitscherlich observed that this angle in the case of calcite varied with the temperature. On extending this inquiry to other allotropic crystals, he observed a similar variation, and was thus led, in 1825, to the discovery that allotropic crystals, when heated, expand unequally in the direction of dissimilar axes. In the following year he discovered the change, produced by change of temperature, in the direction of the optic axes of selenite. His investigation, also in 1826, of the two crystalline modifications of sulfur threw much light on the fact that the two minerals calcite and aragonite have the same composition but different crystalline forms, a property which Mitscherlich called polymorphism.

== Later work and last years ==
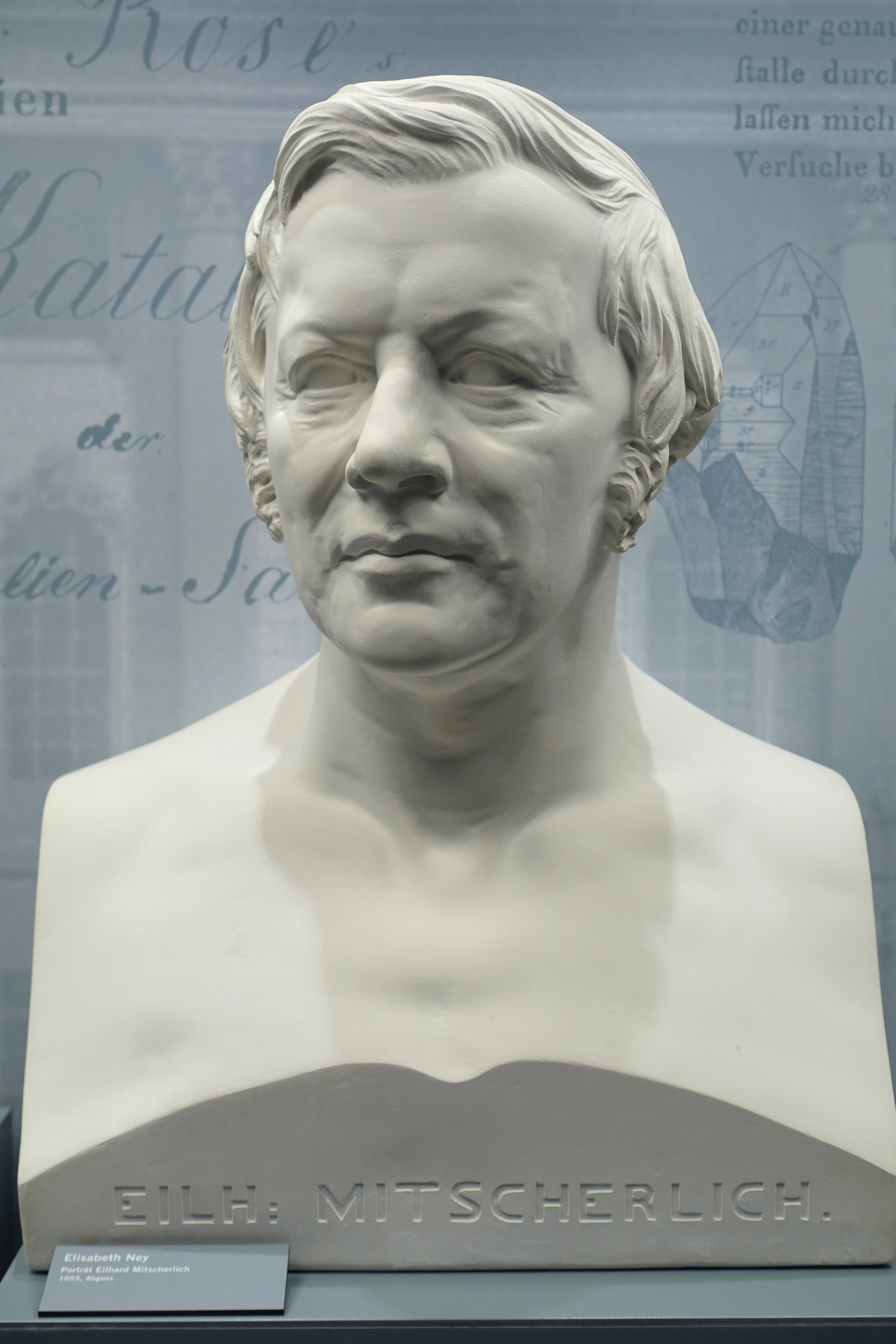
Marble bust of Mitscherlich by Elisabet Ney at the Museum für Naturkunde in Berlin

In 1833 Mitscherlich made a series of careful determinations of the vapor densities of a large number of volatile substances, confirming the law of Gay-Lussac. In 1833–34, Mitscherlich investigated the synthesis of diethyl ether from ethanol and sulfuric acid. Through his careful studies, he realized that the acid was not being consumed during the production of the ether, although the reaction would not proceed unless the acid was present. After reviewing Mitscherlich's findings, Swedish chemist Jöns Jacob Berzelius was led to coin the term "catalysis" for the acceleration or enablement of a chemical reaction by a substance that itself was not consumed in the reaction. He obtained selenic acid in 1827 and showed that its salts are isomorphous with the sulphates, while a few years later he proved that the same thing is true of the manganates and the sulfates, and of the permanganates and the perchlorates. He investigated the relation of benzene to benzoic acid and to other derivatives. As related by Gustav Rose Mitscherlich turned away from inorganic chemistry (crystallography) and devoted his attention to organic chemistry, starting out with an investigation of fuel and oil. Mitscherlich kept working on problems of organic chemistry until 1845. His interest in mineralogy led him to study the geology of volcanic regions, and he made frequent visits to the Eifel in an attempt to develop a theory on the cause of volcanism. He did not, however, publish any papers on the subject, though after his death his notes were arranged and published by J. L. A. Roth in the Memoirs of the Berlin Academy (Ueber die vulkanischen Erscheinungen in der Eifel und über die Metamorphie der Gesteine durch erhöhte Temperatur, Berlin, 1865).

Mitscherlich was an honorary member of almost all the great scientific societies, and received the gold medal from the Royal Society of London for his discovery of the law of isomorphism. He was one of the few foreign associates of the French Institute. In 1855, Mitscherlichwas elected a Foreign Honorary Member of the American Academy of Arts and Sciences.

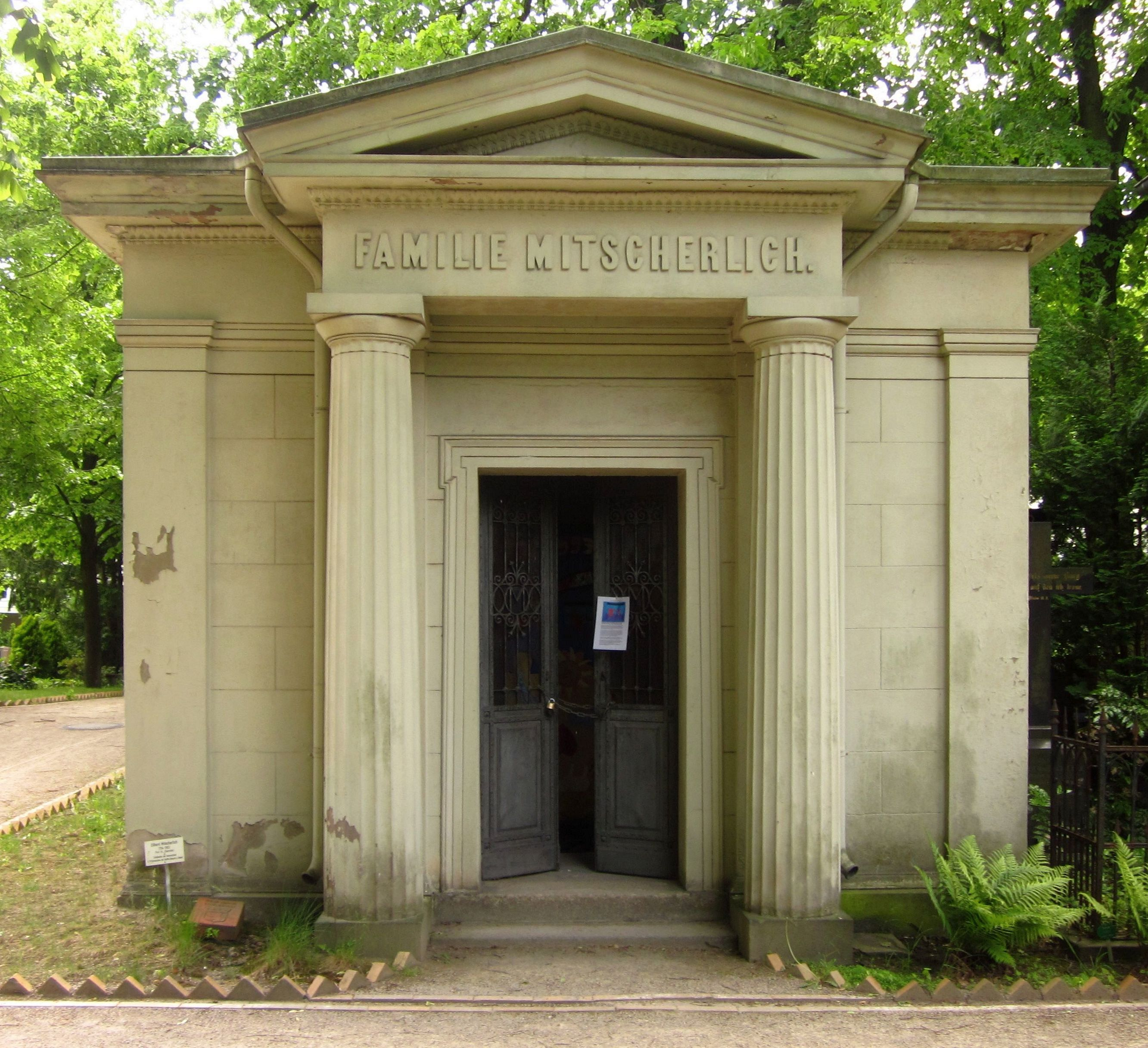
Mitscherlich's mausoleum at the Alter St.-Matthäus-Kirchhof in Berlin

In December 1861, symptoms of heart disease made their appearance, but Mitscherlich was able to carry on his academic work until December 1862. He died at Schöneberg near Berlin in 1863 and was buried in the St Matthäus Kirchhof Cemetery in Schöneberg close to the (eventual) gravesites of Gustav Kirchhoff and Leopold Kronecker.

== Papers ==
Mitscherlich published, according to the "Catalogue of Scientific Papers", some 76 papers, which appeared chiefly in the "Abhandlungen der Königlichen Akademie der Wissenschaften in Berlin", in Poggendorff's Annalen, and in the Annales de chimie et de physique. In 1829 the first installment of the first volume of Mitscherlich's Lehrbuch der Chemie appeared. Not until 1840 the second installment of the second part of this monumental text book was printed. The fourth edition of Mitscherlich's Lehrbuch der Chemie was published in 1844–1847; a fifth was begun in 1855, but was never completed. A complete edition of his works was published in Berlin in 1896.

== See also ==
- Ammonium permanganate
- Ethyl sulfate
- Manganate
- Chemical crystallography before X-rays
- Physical crystallography before X-rays
