= Teach fish how to swim =

Idiomatic expression

Teach fish how to swim is an idiomatic expression derived from the Latin proverb piscem natare doces. The phrase describes the self-sufficiency of those who know better how to do everything than the experts. It corresponds to the expression, "teaching grandmother to suck eggs". Erasmus attributed the origins of the phrase in his Adagia to Diogenianus.

A corollary idiomatic phrase is part of common usage in Chinese "班門弄斧"
