= Ernst Ludwig von Leutsch =

German classical philologist (1808–1887)

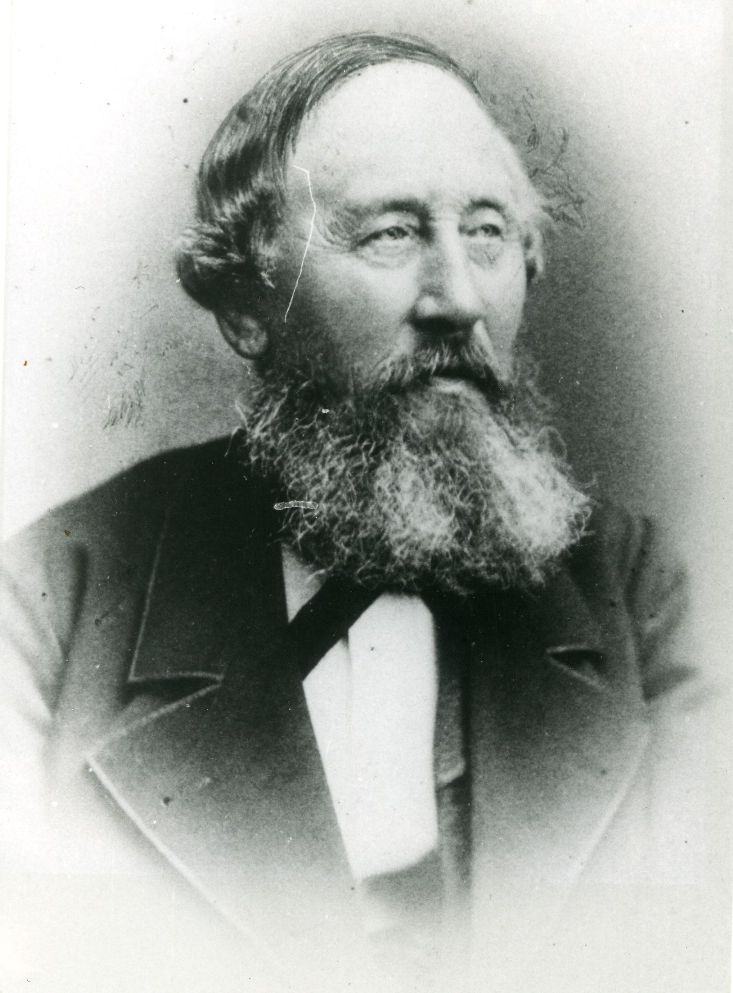
Ernst Ludwig von Leutsch (1808-1887)

Ernst Ludwig von Leutsch (August 16, 1808 – July 28, 1887) was a German classical philologist born in Frankfurt am Main.

He studied classical philology at the University of Göttingen, where he had as instructors Georg Ludolf Dissen, Christoph Wilhelm Mitscherlich and Karl Otfried Müller. It was during this time period that he became lifelong friends with Friedrich Wilhelm Schneidewin.

== Life ==
Ernst von Leutsch was born in 1808 in Frankfurt am Main, where his father, Friedrich August von Leutsch, served as the Royal Saxon envoy to the Prince-Primate Karl Theodor von Dalberg.

In 1830 he received his doctorate, and moved to Berlin for a year, where he continued his education under August Boeckh. In 1831 he returned to Göttingen, where in 1837 he was appointed an associate professor. From 1842 to 1883 he was a full professor of classical philology at the University of Göttingen. Following his retirement, he was replaced at Göttingen by Ulrich von Wilamowitz-Moellendorff.

Following the death of Schneidewin in 1856, Leutsch took over editorship of the Philologus, a journal on classical studies. He remained editor of the journal until his death in 1887. In 1868 he founded the philological gazette, Philologischen Anzeiger. Not a prolific author of books, Leutsch's focus was primarily on his academic teaching, with his favorite subjects being Pindar, Aristophanes, Thucydides, Livy and Tacitus.

Leutsch died in Göttingen.

== Criticism of Leutsch’s Teaching Style ==
Leutsch viewed himself primarily as an academic teacher, and for this reason, he published relatively few writings. Despite this self-conception, his limited oratorical talent and his selection of the ancient authors he chose to read were frequently criticized. He devoted so much space in his lectures to Pindar, Aristophanes, Thucydides, Livy, and Tacitus that little time remained for other figures and periods of Greek and Roman literature; consequently, attendance at his sessions often dwindled toward the end of the semester. Furthermore, his rivalry with his colleague Hermann Sauppe—who wrote and spoke Latin significantly better than Leutsch—negatively affected the atmosphere within the seminar. Leutsch tended to focus on the in-depth, slow translation of short excerpts, thereby failing to offer any broader perspective on more extensive bodies of text.

== Sources ==
- The Classical review (Volume 3) by Classical Association (Great Britain) (Google Books) by D. Nutt, 1889.
