= Johann August Nauck =

German classical philologist (1822–1892)

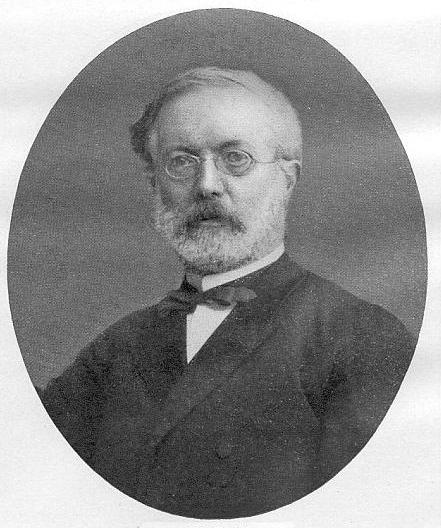
Johann August Nauck

Johann August Nauck (18 September 1822 – 3 August 1892) was a German classical scholar and critic. His chief work was the Tragicorum Graecorum Fragmenta (TrGF).

== Biography ==
Nauck was born at Auerstedt in present-day Thuringia. He studied at the University of Halle as a student of Gottfried Bernhardy and Moritz Hermann Eduard Meier. In 1853 he became an adjunct under August Meineke at the Joachimsthal Gymnasium in Berlin. After a brief stint as an educator at the Grauen Kloster (1858), he relocated to St. Petersburg, where in 1869, he was appointed professor of Greek at the historical-philological institute.

Nauck was one of the most distinguished textual critics of his day, although, like PH Peerlkamp, he was fond of altering a text in accordance with what he thought the author must, or ought to, have written. Nauck was elected a foreign member of the Royal Netherlands Academy of Arts and Sciences in 1885.

== Published works ==
The most important of his writings and translations, all of which deal with Greek language and literature (especially the tragedians) are as follows:

- Fragments of Aristophanes of Byzantium (1848).
- Euripidis Tragoediae superstites et deperditarum fragmenta; ex recensione Augusti Nauckii, (1854). (Euripides, tragedies and fragments).
- Tragicorum Graecorum Fragmenta (1856, last edition, 1983), His chief work — it was intended as a counterpart to Meineke's "comedy fragments", (Fragmenta comicorum graecorum).
- Revised edition of Schneidewin's annotated Sophocles (1856, etc.)
- Porphyrius of Tyre (1860, 2nd ed., 1886); "Porphyrii philosophi Platonici opuscula selecta".
- Lexikon Vindobonense (1867).
- texts of Homer, Odyssey (1874) and Iliad (1877–1879); published as "Homerica carmina" (volume I. Ilias; volume II. Odyssea).
- Iamblichus, De Vita Pythagorica (1884).
