= Friedrich Wilhelm Schneidewin =

German classical scholar

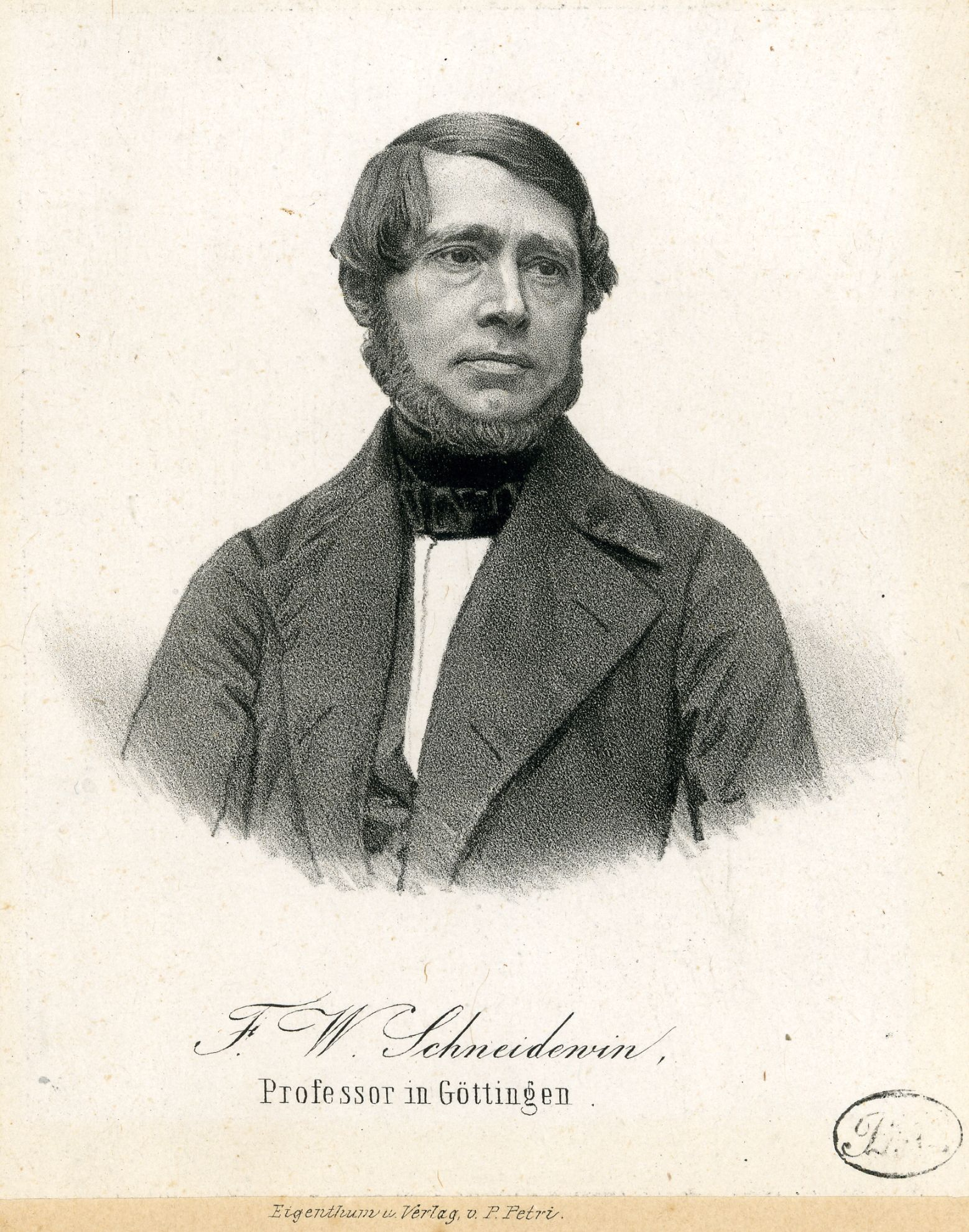
Friedrich Wilhelm Schneidewin.

Friedrich Wilhelm Schneidewin (6 June 1810 – 11 January 1856), was a German classical scholar.

== Biography ==
He was born on 6 June 1810 at Helmstedt. In 1833, he became a teacher at the Braunschweig gymnasium. In 1837 he was appointed an associate professor, and in 1842, a full professor of classical languages and literature at the University of Göttingen where he died on 11 January 1856.

== Works ==
Schneidewin's work on Sophocles and the Greek lyric poets is of permanent value. His most important publications are:

- Ibyci Rhegini carminum reliquiae (1833), severely criticized by G. Hermann. OCLC 697794604.
- Simonidis Cei carminum reliquiae (1835); edition of Simonides of Ceos. OCLC 669931212. Internet Archive.
- Delectus poesis Graecorum elegiacae, iambicae, melicae (1838-39), in which the fragments of the lyric poets were for the first time published in a convenient form. OCLC 697612522.
- Corpus Paroemiographorum Graecorum: Zenobius, Diogenianus, Plutarchus and Gregorius Cyprius, 1839–51, with E. von Leutsch), Göttingen, Vandenhoeck & Ruprecht. OCLC 910311709. Vol. 1: Internet Archive; Vol. 2: Internet Archive.
- Sophocles (1849-1854, revised after his death by A. Nauck). Revised 1865 edition: Internet Archive.

He also edited the fragments of the speeches of Hypereides on behalf of Euxenippus and Lycophron (already published by Churchill Babington from a papyrus discovered in Thebes, Egypt, in 1847) and a Latin poem on rhetorical figures by an unknown author (Incerti auctoris de figuris vel schematibus versus heroici, 1841), found by Jules Quicherat in a manuscript in the Paris library. Schneidewin was also the founder of Philologus (1846), a journal devoted to classical learning and dedicated to the memory of K. O. Müller.
