= John William Donaldson =

English academic and writer (1811–1861)

John William Donaldson (7 June 1811 – 10 February 1861) was an English academic and writer in Greek classics, a philologist and a biblical critic.

He was born in London, and was educated at University College, London, and Trinity College, Cambridge, of which he subsequently became a fellow. In 1841 he was elected headmaster of King Edward's School, Bury St Edmunds, but, "spectacularly unsuccessful", in 1855 he resigned his post and returned to Cambridge, where his time was divided between literary work and private tuition.

He is remembered as a pioneer of philology in the UK, though much of his work is now obsolete. The New Cratylus (1839), the book on which his fame mainly rests, was an attempt to apply to Greek the principles of comparative philology. The same year he was ordained deacon and in 1849 was graduated from Trinity College, Cambridge as a Doctor of Divinity. It was founded mainly on the comparative grammar of Franz Bopp, but a large part of it was original, Bopp's grammar not being completed ten years after the first edition of the Cratylus. In Donaldson's Varronianus (1844) the same method was applied to Latin, Umbrian and Oscan. He began a Greek dictionary, which was to have been the great work of his life and which he left unfinished apparently dying of mental stress of overwork, simultaneously being a tutor at Cambridge University and examiner at the University of London. When advised to take six months' rest he replied that this would cost him £1500. He spent his final four weeks moved to London however unable to conduct the students' examinations in his role as examiner.

== Personal life and headmastership ==
Donaldson lost his fellowship in 1840 on his marriage to Eleanor Leathes Mortlock, nicknamed "Laetitia", daughter of Sir John Cheetham Mortlock, banker at Cambridge. With Laetitia, Donaldson had two sons and two daughters. His first wife predeceased him, and he went on to marry Louisa, daughter of John Rawlins; they had three daughters. After taking pupils for a time at Winfrith in Dorset, in 1841 Donaldson was appointed headmaster of King Edward's School, Bury St Edmunds, an appointment unfortunate for the institution and for himself. He was deficient in judgement and administrative power, and the school declined under him, notwithstanding his efforts to obtain reputation by the publication of Latin and Greek grammars, which met with little acceptance beyond the sphere of his personal influence and involved him in controversy. They were probably too scientific for school use, and his conviction of the defects of standard grammars had been expressed with indiscreet candour. He was active in the cultural life of Bury St Edmunds, where he greatly improved the Athenaeum.

== Book of Jashar ==
Donaldson resigned the headmastership in 1855 partly on account of the outcry caused by the publication of Jashar; [subtitled:] fragmenta archetypa carminum Hebraicorum; collegit, ordinavit, restituit J. G. Donaldson at the end of 1854. In this extraordinary work he endeavoured to show that fragments of a book of Jashar are to be found throughout the Old Testament scriptures up to the time of Solomon, that the book was compiled in the reign of that monarch, and that its remains constitute ‘the religious marrow of the scriptures’. The work was heavily criticized and Donaldson's religious orthodoxy was questioned. Although he defended his position in a vigorous pamphlet, he failed to convince his critics.

His Jashar (1854), written in Latin as an appeal to the learned world and especially to German theologians, was an attempt to reconstitute the lost biblical book of Jashar from the remains of old songs and historical records, which, according to the author, are incorporated in the existing text of the Old Testament. His bold views on the nature of inspiration, and his free handling of the sacred text, aroused the anger of the theologians and Donaldson's religious orthodoxy was questioned.

Of his many other works, most important are:

- The Theatre of the Greeks; The History of the Literature of Ancient Greece (a translation and completion of Karl Otfried Müller's unfinished work) with P.W. Buckham
- The Odes of Pindar (his edition)
- Antigone of Sophocles (his edition)
- A Hebrew, a Greek and a Latin grammar.
