= Julius Müller (theologian) =

German Protestant theologian (1801–1878)

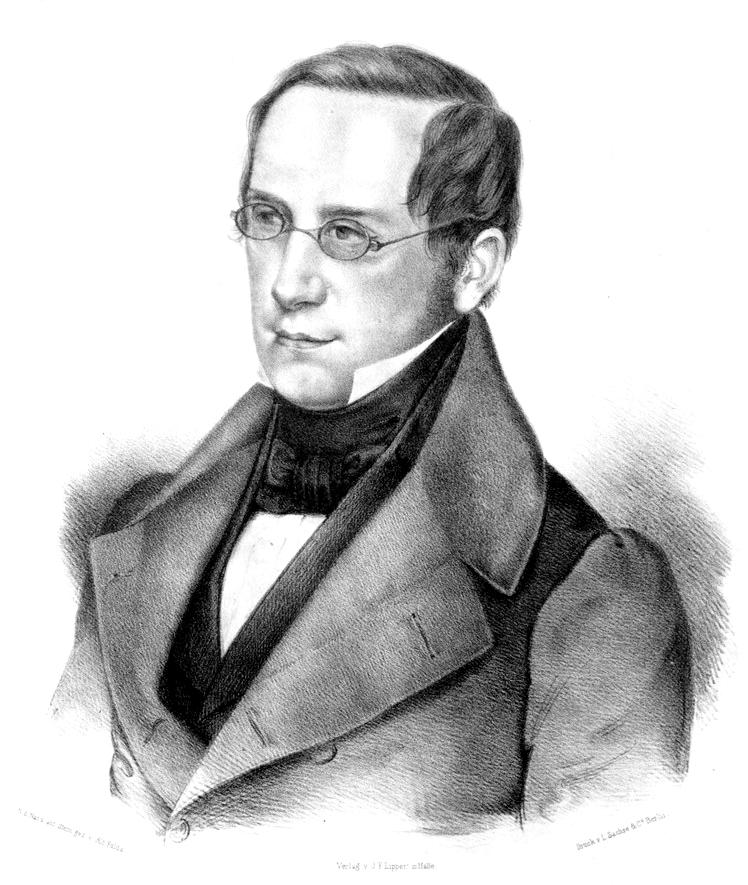
Julius Müller

Julius Müller (10 April 1801 – 27 September 1878) was a German Protestant theologian.

== Biography ==
He was born at Brieg (now Brzeg, Poland) and studied at Breslau, Göttingen and Berlin – first law, which he later abandoned for theology. From 1825 to 1831, he was in charge of several small parishes. In 1831, he was second university preacher at Göttingen University, and lectured on practical theology and pedagogics. In 1834, he became professor extraordinarius of theology there. From 1835 to 1839 he was professor in Marburg. In 1839 he became professor ordinarius of theology at the University of Halle, where he remained for the rest of his life. He died at Halle.

A disciple of Neander and friend of Richard Rothe, Müller bitterly opposed the philosophy of G. W. F. Hegel and the criticism of F. C. Baur. His book, Über den Gegensatz des Protestantismus und das Catholicismus (On the Opposition of Protestantism and Catholicism, 1833), called forth a reply from Baur, and he was one of those who attacked David Strauss's Life of Jesus.

In 1846, he had been deputed to attend the General Evangelical Synod at Berlin. Here he supported the Consensus-Union and afterwards defended himself in the pamphlets Die erste Generalsynode der evangelische Landeskirche Preussens (1847) and Die evangelische Union, ihr Wesen und göttliches Recht (1854). In 1848 he helped to found the Deutsch-Evangelische Kirchentag, and two years later founded and edited (1850–1861), with August Neander and Karl Nitzsch, the Deutsche Zeitschrift für christliche Wissenschaft und christliches Leben.

His chief work, however, was Die christliche Lehre der Sünde (The Christian Teaching of Sin, 2 volumes, 1839; 5th edition, 1867; English translation from 5th edition), in which he went so far as "to revive the ancient Gnostic theory of the fall of man before all time, a theory which found no favour amongst his theological friends." Müller's other works include Dogmatische Abhandlungen (1870), and Das christliche Leben (3rd edition, 1847).

== Family ==
His brothers were Karl Otfried Müller (1797–1840), an archeologist and philologist, and Eduard Müller (1804–1875), a philologist.
