= Diogenianus =

Greek grammarian

Diogenianus (Greek: Διογενειανός, Διογενιανός) was a Greek grammarian from Heraclea in Pontus (or in Caria) who flourished during the reign of Hadrian (117–138). He was the author of an alphabetical lexicon, chiefly of poetical words, abridged from the great lexicon (Περὶ γλωσσῶν) of Pamphilus of Alexandria (AD 50) and other similar works. It was also known by the title Περιεργοπένητες (“Manual for those without means”). It formed the basis of the lexicon, or rather glossary, of Hesychius of Alexandria, which is described in the preface as a new edition of the work of Diogenianus. A collection of 776 proverbs under his name is still extant bearing the name Παροιμίαι δημώδεις ἐκ τῆς Διογενιανοῦ συναγωγῆς, probably an abridgment of the collection made by himself from his lexicon (ed. by Ernst von Leutsch and Friedrich Wilhelm Schneidewin in Paroemiographi Graeci, i. 1839). Diogenianus was also the author of an "Anthology of epigrams about rivers, lakes, cliffs, mountains and mountain ridges" (Ἐπιγραμμάτων ἀνθολόγιον περὶ ποταμῶν λιμνῶν κρηνῶν ὀρῶν ἀκρωρειῶν), a list (with map) of all the towns in the world (Συναγωγὴ καὶ πίναξ τῶν ἐν πάσῃ τῇ γῇ πόλεων)., and of a list of rivers (περὶ ποταμῶν κατὰ στοιχεῖον ἐπίτομος ἀναγραφή)

Erasmus in his Adagia (1508) attributes to Diogenianus the origins of the Latin proverb piscem natare doces (teach fish how to swim; Greek: Ἰχθὺν νήχεσθαι διδάσκεις).

Diogenianus is the first person known to have referred to the parable of The Dog in the Manger.
