= Eduard Müller (philologist) =

German educator and philologist

Eduard Müller (born in Brieg, 1804 November 12; died in Liegnitz, 1875 November 30) was a German educator and philologist.

== Biography ==
From 1821 he studied theology and philology at the University of Breslau, where he was a pupil of Franz Passow, then in 1823 relocated to the University of Göttingen as a student of Georg Ludolf Dissen and Karl Christian Friedrich Krause. He later worked as a teacher in Ratibor, where he eventually attained the post of prorector. From 1841 he served in the same capacity at the gymnasium in Liegnitz, receiving the title of professor in 1846.

== Works ==
- Geschichte der Theorie der Kunst bei den Alten (History of the theory of art among the ancients; 2 volumes, Breslau, 1834–37) – considered to be his main work.
- Ueber Sophokleische Naturanschauung, 1842 – On Sophocles' view of nature.
- Simson und Delilah (1853), a tragedy.
- Karl Otfried Müller's kleine deutsche Schriften über Religion, Kunst, Sprache und Literatur, Leben und Geschichte des Alterthums gesammelt (2 volumes 1847–48, 2nd edition 1857) – A collection of smaller writings by his brother, Karl Otfried Müller, on religion, art, language, literature and the history of antiquity (edited by Eduard Müller).
- Parallelen zu den Messianischen Weissagungen und Typen des Alten Testaments aus dem hellenischen Alterthum, 1875.

== Family ==
- His brother Karl Otfried Müller was a noted archaeologist, and another brother, Julius Müller, was a Protestant theologian.
