= Georg Friedrich Creuzer =

German philologist and archaeologist (1771–1858)

Friedrich Creuzer
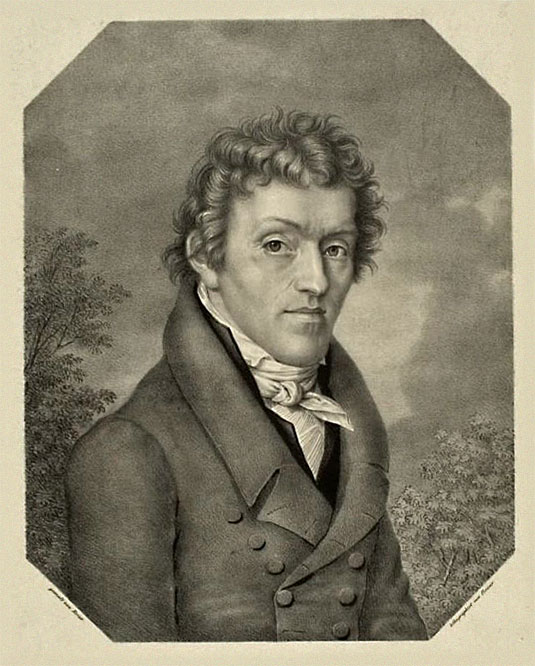
- Born: 10 March 1771; Marburg, Landgraviate of Hesse-Kassel
- Died: 6 February 1858 (aged 86); Heidelberg, Grand Duchy of Baden
- Education: University of Marburg; University of Jena
- Occupations: Philologist, archaeologist

Georg Friedrich Creuzer (German: [ˈɡeːɔʁk ˈfʁiːdʁɪç ˈkʁɔʏtsɐ]; 10 March 1771 – 6 February 1858) was a German philologist and archaeologist.

== Life ==
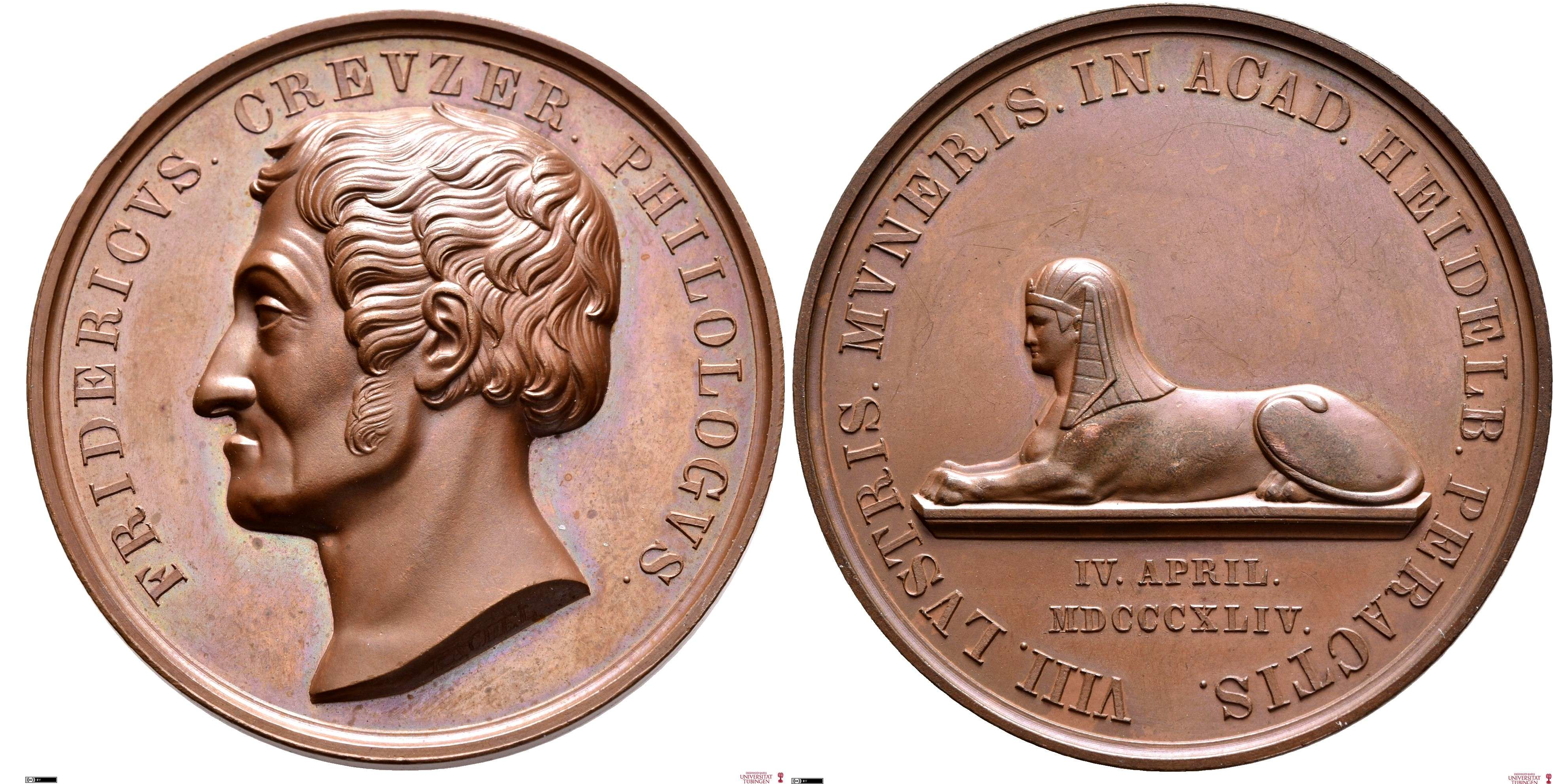
Medaille Georg Friedrich Creuzer 1844

He was born in Marburg, the son of a bookbinder. After studying at the University of Marburg and at the University of Jena, he went to Leipzig as a private tutor; but in 1802 he was appointed professor at Marburg, and two years later professor of philology and ancient history at Heidelberg. He held the latter position for nearly forty-five years, with the exception of a short time spent at the University of Leiden, where his health was affected by the Dutch climate.

Creuzer was one of the principal founders of the Philological Seminary established at Heidelberg in 1807. The Académie des Inscriptions et Belles-Lettres, Paris, appointed him one of its members, and from the Grand Duke of Baden he received the dignity of privy councillor.

In 1844, Creuzer received a medal for his 40th anniversary of employment at Heidelberg. This medal was made by the engraver Ludwig Kachel.

== Work ==
Creuzer's first and most famous work was his Symbolik und Mythologie der alten Völker, besonders der Griechen (1810–12, 2nd ed. 1819, 3rd ed. 1837), in which he maintained that the mythology of Homer and Hesiod came from an Eastern source through the Pelasgians, and reflected the symbolism of an ancient revelation; as a reconciliation with Judeo-Christian religion, it was, Walter Burkert has said, "the last large-scale and thoroughly unavailing endeavor of this kind."

This work ran counter to the ideology of romantic nationalism, which held literature and culture to be intimately connected with a Volk, epitomized by Karl Otfried Müller's concept of a Greek Stammeskultur, a Greek "tribal culture". For this and the next generations, "origins and organic development rather than reciprocal cultural influences became the key to understanding."

Creuzer's work was vigorously attacked by Johann Gottfried Jakob Hermann in his Briefen über Homer und Hesiod, and in his letter, addressed to Creuzer, Über das Wesen und die Behandlung der Mythologie; by Johann Heinrich Voss in his Antisymbolik; and by Christian Lobeck in his Aglaophamus. It was briefly praised, however, by Hegel in his Philosophy of Right.

Creuzer's other works include:

- an edition of Plotinus
- a partial edition of Cicero, in preparing which he was assisted by Moser
- Epochen der griechischen Literaturgeschichte (1802)
- Die historische Kunst der Griechen (1803)
- Abriss der römischen Antiquitaten (1824)
- Zur Geschichte altrömischer Cultur am Oberrhein und Neckar (1833)
- Zur Gemmenkunde (1834)
- Das Mithreum von Neuenheim (1838)
- Zur Galerie der alten Dramatiker (1839)
- Zur Geschichte der classischen Philologie (1854).

See the autobiographical Aus dem Leben eines alten Professors (Leipzig and Darmstadt, 1848), to which was added in the year of his death Paralipomena der Lebenskunde eines alten Professors (Frankfurt, 1858); also Starck, Friederich Kreuzer, sein Bildungsgang und seine bleibende Bedeutung (Heidelberg, 1875).
