= Friedrich Wieseler =

German classical archaeologist

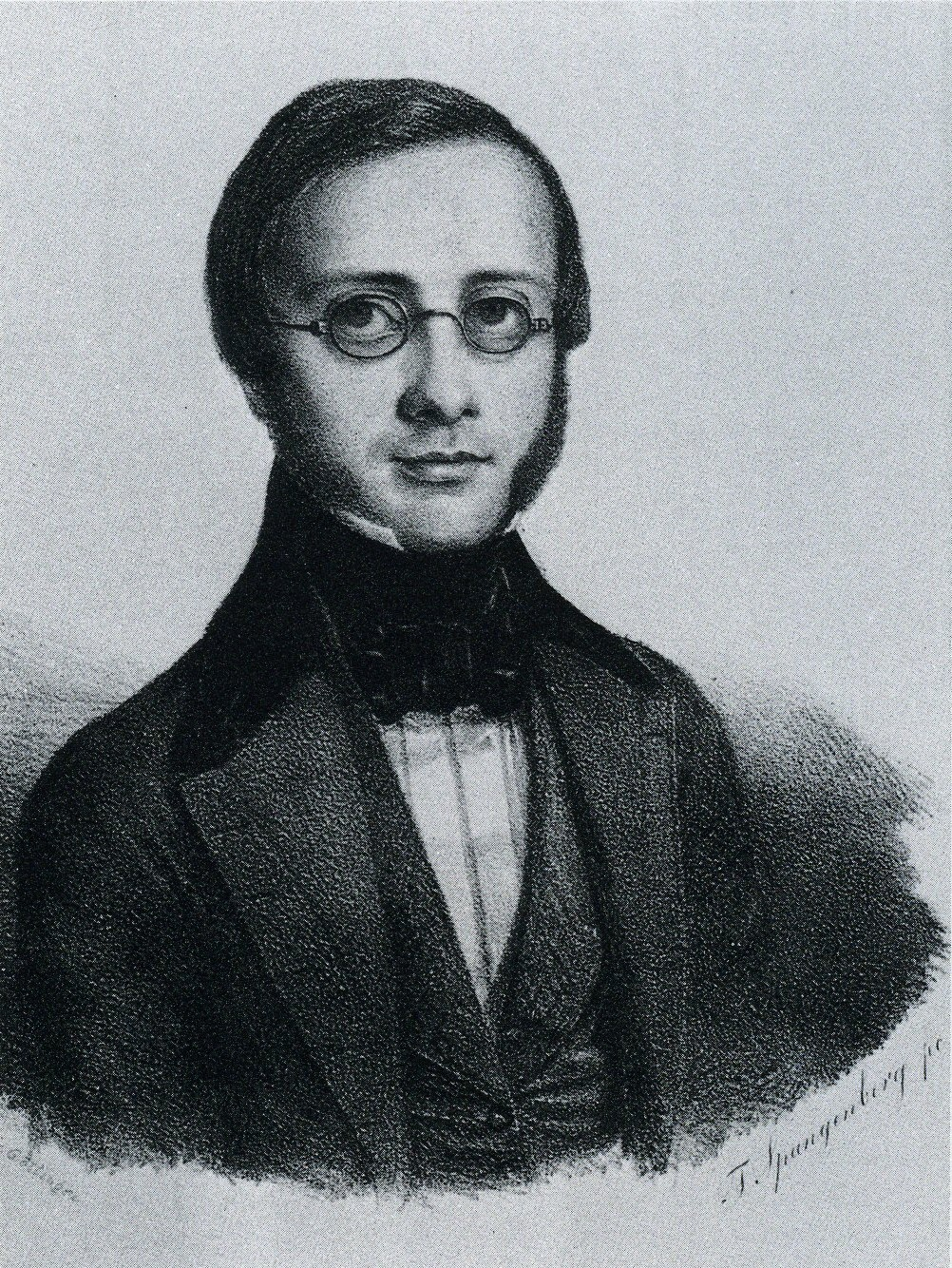
Friedrich Wieseler

Friedrich Wieseler (19 October 1811, Altencelle – 3 December 1892, Göttingen) was a German classical archaeologist and philologist.

== Life ==
He studied classical philology at the University of Göttingen, where he was a disciple of Karl Otfried Müller. Afterwards, he lived as a private scholar in Berlin, where he attended lectures by August Boeckh. In 1837 he received his doctorate from the University of Jena, later becoming an associate professor at Göttingen (1842). Here, he also served as a supervisor of the archaeological and numismatic collections. In 1854 he became a full professor, and from 1869, he was a member of the Göttingen Academy of Sciences.

== Writings ==
Wieseler was the author of well-regarded works on ancient Greek and Roman theatre, as well as papers involving figures from classical mythology. In the field of archaeology, he continued Muller's Denkmäler der alten Kunst ("Monuments of ancient art").

- Ueber die Thymele des Griechischen theaters : eine archäologische Abhandlung, 1847 – On the tholos of Greek theatre: an archaeological treatise.
- Theatergebäude und Denkmäler des Bühnenwesens bei den Griechen und Römern, 1851 – Theatre buildings and monuments of stage characters involving the Greeks and Romans.
- Narkissos; eine kunstmythologische abhandlung nebst einem anhang über die narcissen und ihre beziehung im leben, mythos und cultus der Griechen, 1856 – Narcissus, a treatise on mythological art, etc.
- Phaethon. Eine archäologische Abhandlung, 1857 – Phaethon, An archaeological treatise.
- Observationes in Theogoniam Hesiodeam, 1863.
- Ueber den delphischen Dreifuss, 1871 – About the Delphic tripod.
- Scenische und kritische bemerkungen zu Euripides' Kyklops, 1881 – Critical remarks on Euripides' Cyclops.
- Novae schedae criticae in Aristophanis Aves, 1882.
