= Pamphilus of Alexandria =

Pamphilus of Alexandria (Ancient Greek: Πάμφιλος ὁ Ἀλεξανδρεύς; fl. 1st century AD) was a Greek grammarian, of the school of Aristarchus of Samothrace.

He was the author of a comprehensive lexicon, in 95 books, of foreign or obscure words, the idea of which was credited to another grammarian, Zopyrion, himself the compiler of the first four books. The work itself is lost, but an epitome by Diogenianus (2nd century) formed the basis of the lexicon of Hesychius.

A similar compilation, called "meadow" (cf. the Prata of Suetonius) from its varied contents, dealing chiefly with mythological marvels, was probably a supplement to the lexicon, although some scholars identify them. Pamphilus was one of the chief authorities used by Athenaeus in the Deipnosophists. The Suda assigns to another Pamphilus, simply described as "a philosopher," a number of works, some of which were probably by Pamphilus the grammarian.

See G Thilo in Ersch and Gruber's Allgemeine Encyclopedic, M Schmidt, appendix to his edition of Hesychius, (1862) vol. iv.; A Westermann in Pauly's Realencyclopädie (1848).
