= Christian Lobeck =

German classical scholar

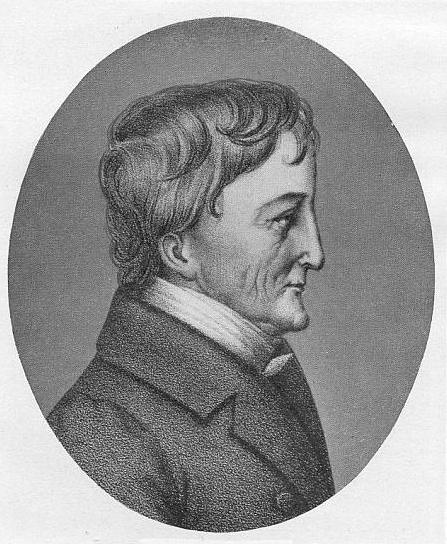
Christian Lobeck

Christian August Lobeck (German: [ˈloːbɛk]; 5 June 1781 – 25 August 1860) was a German classical scholar.

Lobeck was born at Naumburg, in the Electorate of Saxony. After studying at the universities of Jena and Leipzig, he became Privatdozent at the University of Wittenberg in 1802, and in 1810 was appointed to a professorship there. Four years later, he accepted the chair of rhetoric and ancient literature at Königsberg, which he occupied till within two years of his death.

His literary activities were devoted to the history of Greek religion and to the Greek language and literature. His most important work, Aglaophamus (1829), maintains, against the views put forward by G. F. Creuzer in his Symbolik (1810–1823), that the religion of the Greek mysteries (especially those of Eleusis) did not essentially differ from the national religion; that it was not esoteric, and that the priests as such neither taught nor possessed any higher knowledge of God; that the Oriental elements were a later importation. In his treatment of Orphic literature, he argued that the evidence left by the Neoplatonists cannot necessarily be considered to "represent the oldest strands of Orphic ideas". According to Radcliffe Edmonds, it is with Lobeck's work that the "history of modern Orphic scholarship begins".

Lobeck's edition of the Ajax of Sophocles (1809) (Note: A second and a third edition of Ajax appeared in Leipzig 1835 and Berlin 1866 respectively. The full details of the third one are as follows: Sophoclis Aiax, commentario perpetuo illustravit Christ. Augustus Lobeck, editio tertia, Berolini: apud Weidmannos 1866.) had gained him a reputation a scholar and critic; his Phrynichus (1820), Paralipomena grammaticae Graecae (vol. I–II; 1837), (Note: The full title is as follows: Paralipomena grammaticae Graecae: pars prior, qua continentur dissertationes de praeceptis euphonicis, de nominibus monosyllabis, de adjectivis immobilibus, de substantivorum primae declinationis paragoge ionica; pars posterior, qua continentur dissertationes de nominibus substantivi et adjectivi generis ambiguis, de nominum in -ma exeuntium formatione, de motione adjectivorum minus mobilium, de figura etymologica; Lipsiae: apud Weidmannos 1837.) Pathologiae sermonis Graeci prolegomena (1843), and Pathologiae Graeci sermonis elementa (vol. I–II; 1853–62) reveal his wide acquaintance with Greek grammar. He had little sympathy with comparative philology, holding that it needed a lifetime to acquire a thorough knowledge of a single language.

See the article by L. Friedländer in Allgemeine deutsche Biographie; Conrad Bursian's Geschichte der klassischen Philologie in Deutschland (1883); Lehrs, Populäre Aufsätze aus dem Altertum (2nd ed., Leipzig, 1875); Lüdwich, Ausgewählte Briefe von und an Chr. Aug. Lobeck und K. Lehrs' (1894); also JE Sandys, History of Classical Scholarship (1st ed. 1908). Howevever, Friedrich Nietzsche leveled some very harsh criticisms of Lobeck in the section of Twilight of the Idols entitled "What I owe to the ancients."

== Sources ==
- Edmonds, Radcliffe G. (2004), Myths of the Underworld Journey: Plato, Aristophanes, and the 'Orphic' Gold Tablets, Cambridge University Press, 2004. ISBN 978-0-521-83434-6.
- Edmonds, Radcliffe G. (2013), Redefining Ancient Orphism: A Study in Greek Religion, Cambridge University Press, 2013. ISBN 978-1-107-03821-9.
