= Karl Otfried Müller =

German scholar of classical Greek studies (1797–1840)

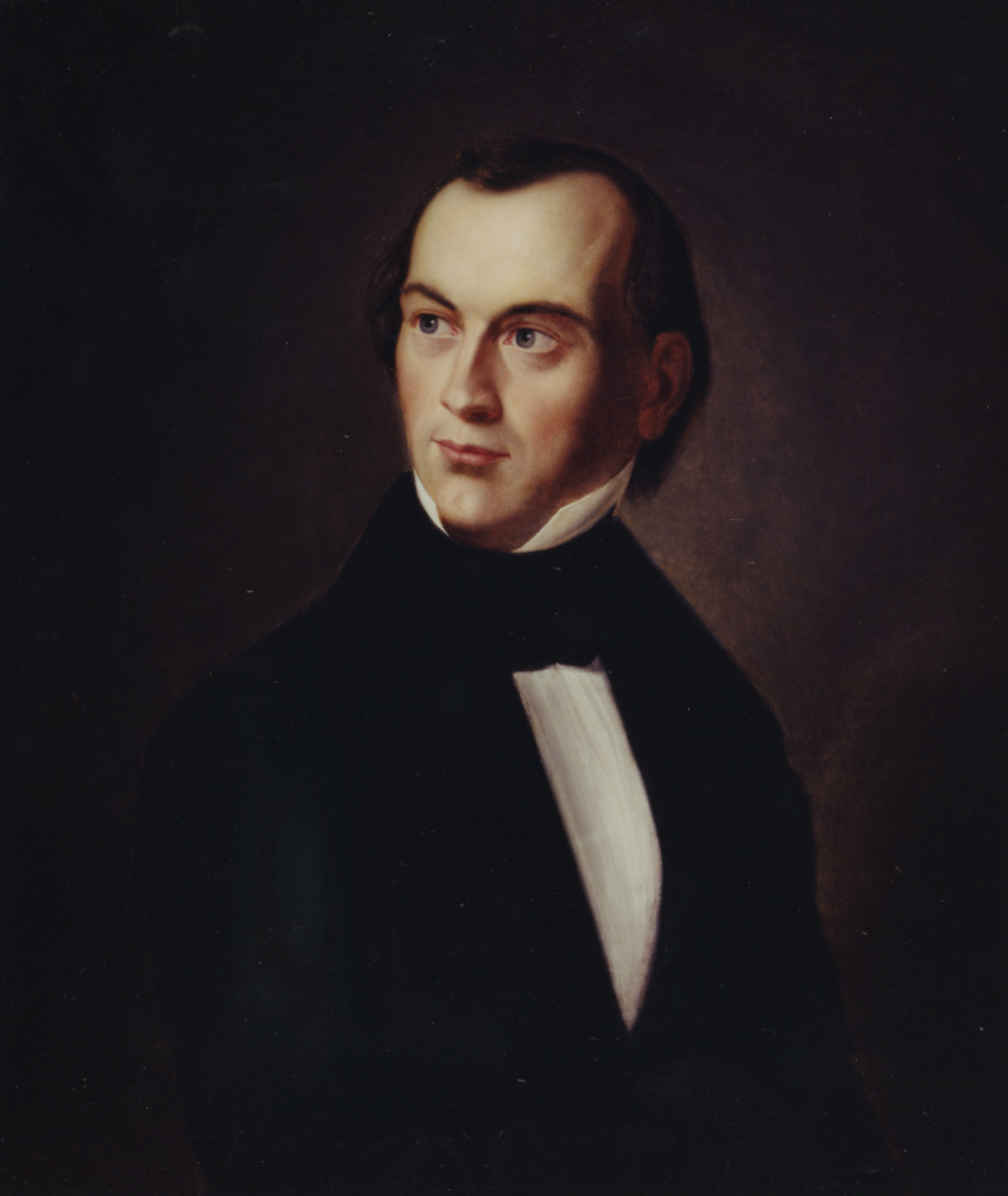
- Portrait of Karl Otfried Müller by Wilhelm Ternite (1838)
- Born: 28 August 1797; Brieg, Silesia, Kingdom of Prussia
- Died: 1 August 1840 (aged 42); Athens, Greece
- Relatives: Julius Müller (brother, 1801–1878); Eduard Müller (brother, 1804–1875)

Academic background
- Education: University of Göttingen
- Academic advisor: August Böckh

Academic work
- Notable students: Friedrich Wieseler
- Influenced: G. F. Creuzer; Christian August Lobeck; Carl Oesterley; George Cornewall Lewis; J. W. Donaldson; Gottfried Hermann

Karl Otfried Müller (Latin: Carolus Mullerus; 28 August 1797 – 1 August 1840) was a German professor, scholar of classical Greek studies and philodorian.

== Biography ==
He was born at Brieg (modern Brzeg) in Silesia, then in the Kingdom of Prussia. His father was a chaplain in the Prussian army, and he was raised in the atmosphere of Protestant Pietism. He attended the gymnasium of his town. His university education was partly at Breslau (now Wrocław) and partly at Berlin. In Berlin, he was spurred towards the study of Greek literature, art and history by the influence of August Böckh. In 1817, after the publication of his first work, Aegineticorum liber, on the Aeginetans, he received an appointment at the Magdaleneum in Breslau, and in 1819 he was made adjunct professor of ancient literature at the University of Göttingen, his subject being the archaeology and history of ancient art. He deepened his understanding of Greek art by travelling in the summer of 1822 to the Netherlands, England and France.

Turning away from the Enlightenment conception of Greek myth as a reflection of a universal religion in its infancy, Müller placed the study squarely as the outcome of an encounter between the particular character of a people and a specific historical setting, where, in the broadest sense it has remained, though his convictions that the core of each culture is uniquely its own led him to deny the influence of Egyptian art on Greek art, already being recognised at the time.

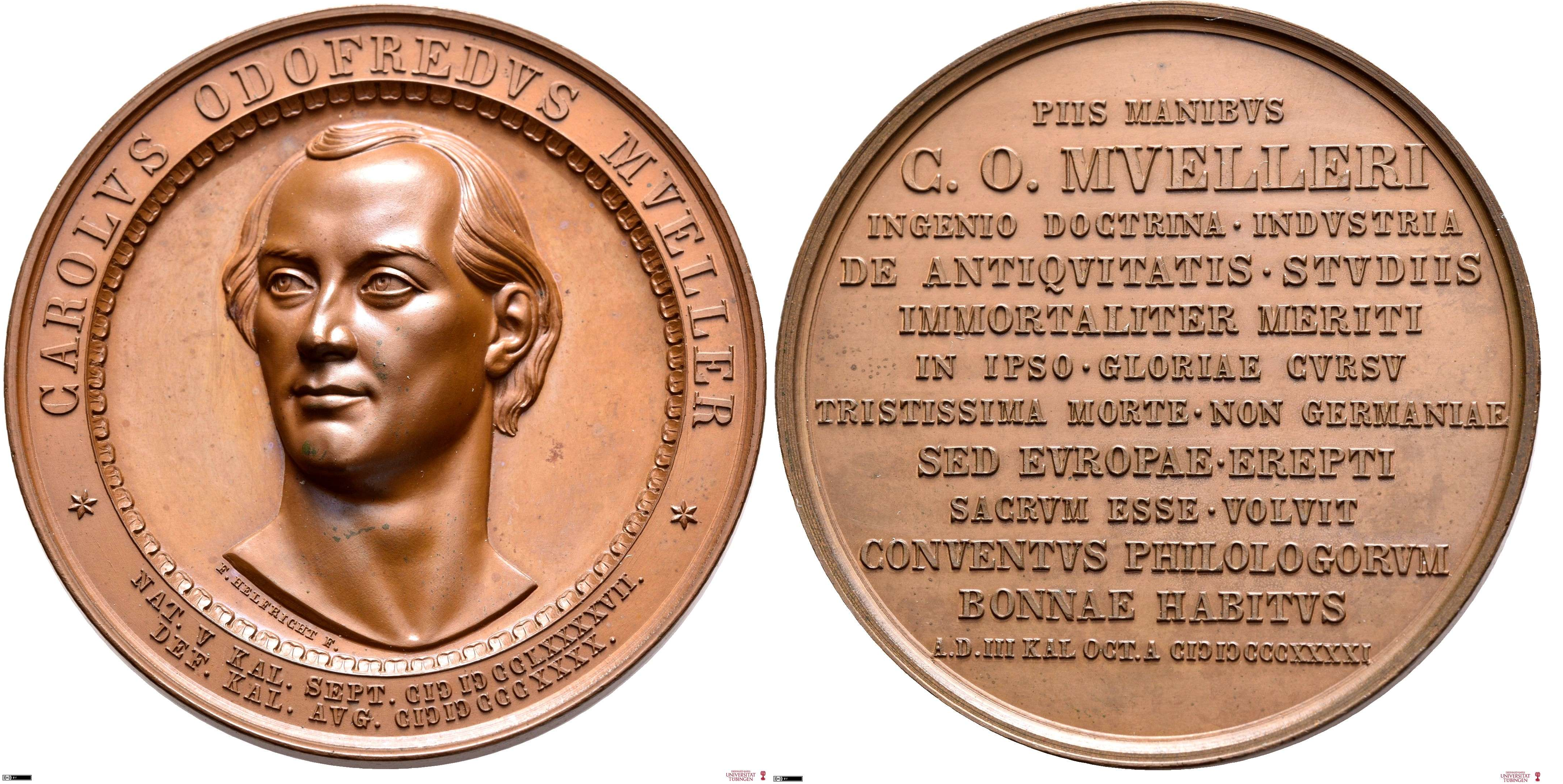
Medal Karl Otfried Müller 1841

Müller's position at Göttingen was made difficult by the political troubles which followed the accession of Ernest Augustus, King of Hanover, in 1837, and he applied for permission to travel, leaving Germany in 1839. In April of the following year he reached Greece, having spent the winter in Italy. He investigated the remains of ancient Athens, visited numerous places in Peloponnesus, and finally went to Delphi, where he began excavations. He was attacked by intermittent fever, of which he died at Athens. His grave is on the Colonus hilltop in Athens next to that of Charles Lenormant. In 1841 a medal was struck in his honor.

== Work ==
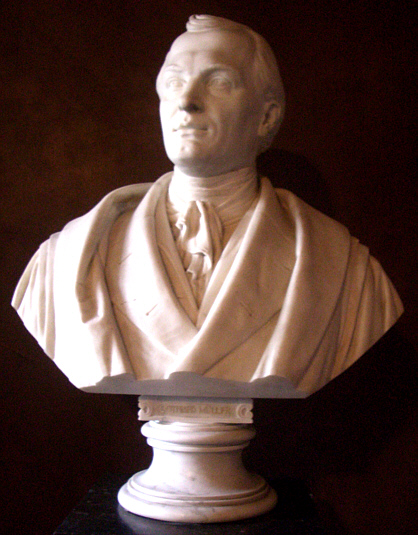
Bust of Müller at the University of Göttingen.

His aim was to form a vivid conception of Greek life as a whole. Undoubtedly he wished to concentrate the results of his whole life of scholarly activity in his magnum opus, Geschichten hellenischen Stämme und Städte. However, he only managed to complete two volumes: Orchomenos und die Minyer (1820) and Die Dorier (1824). The latter includes the essay Über die Makedonier, on the settlements, origin and early history of the Macedonians. He introduced a new standard of accuracy in the cartography of ancient Greece. In 1828 he published Die Etrusker, a treatise on Etruscan antiquities.

His Prolegomena zu einer wissenschaftlichen Mythologie (1825), in which he avoided the views of G. F. Creuzer and Christian August Lobeck, prepared the way for the scientific investigation of myths. Working without the benefit of modern understanding of psychology, he offered steps towards the "internal idea" of myth and presented techniques for determining the age of a mythus from the mentions of it in literary sources and a notable chapter on how to separate the mythus from the modifications of poets and prose writers, and examined the relations that Homer and Hesiod bore to their traditions, all of this before the supportive contributions of modern archaeology, philological analysis, or the understanding of oral transmission of myth, a remarkable achievement.

The study of ancient art was promoted by his Handbuch der Archäologie der Kunst (1830; 3d ed. by Welcker, 1848; English translation by J. Leitch, London, 1847) and Denkmäler der alten Kunst (1832), which he wrote in association with Carl Oesterley. In the former work, he coined the term "pornographie" (pornography) in German, which helped to popularize the term internationally. The latter work was continued and completed by Friedrich Wieseler (1846–56).

In the last years of his life, he undertook to prepare for the English Society for the Diffusion of Useful Knowledge, a history of Greek literature, which in 1841 appeared posthumously as Geschichte der griechischen Litteratur bis auf das Zeitalter Alexanders (4th edition, revised and continued by Heitz, 1882–84). It was translated into English from the author's manuscript as History of the Literature of Ancient Greece and published the previous year in London. Chapters i.-xxii. were translated by Sir George Cornewall Lewis; chapters xxiii.-xxxvi. by J. W. Donaldson, who carried the work down to the taking of Constantinople by the Turks. It remained one of the best books on the subject for many years.

Müller also published an admirable translation of the Eumenides of Aeschylus with introductory essays (1833). This was the object of a profound controversy in which Gottfried Hermann and his followers attacked him with great bitterness. Müller published new editions of Varro, De Lingua Latina (Leipzig, 1833) and Festus, De Significatione Verborum (Leipzig, 1839).

== Quotes ==
- "A democracy likes a large mass and hates all divisions."

== Family ==
His brothers were Julius Müller (1801–1878), a theologian, and Eduard Müller (1804–1875), a philologist.
