= Christoph Wilhelm Mitscherlich =

German classical scholar

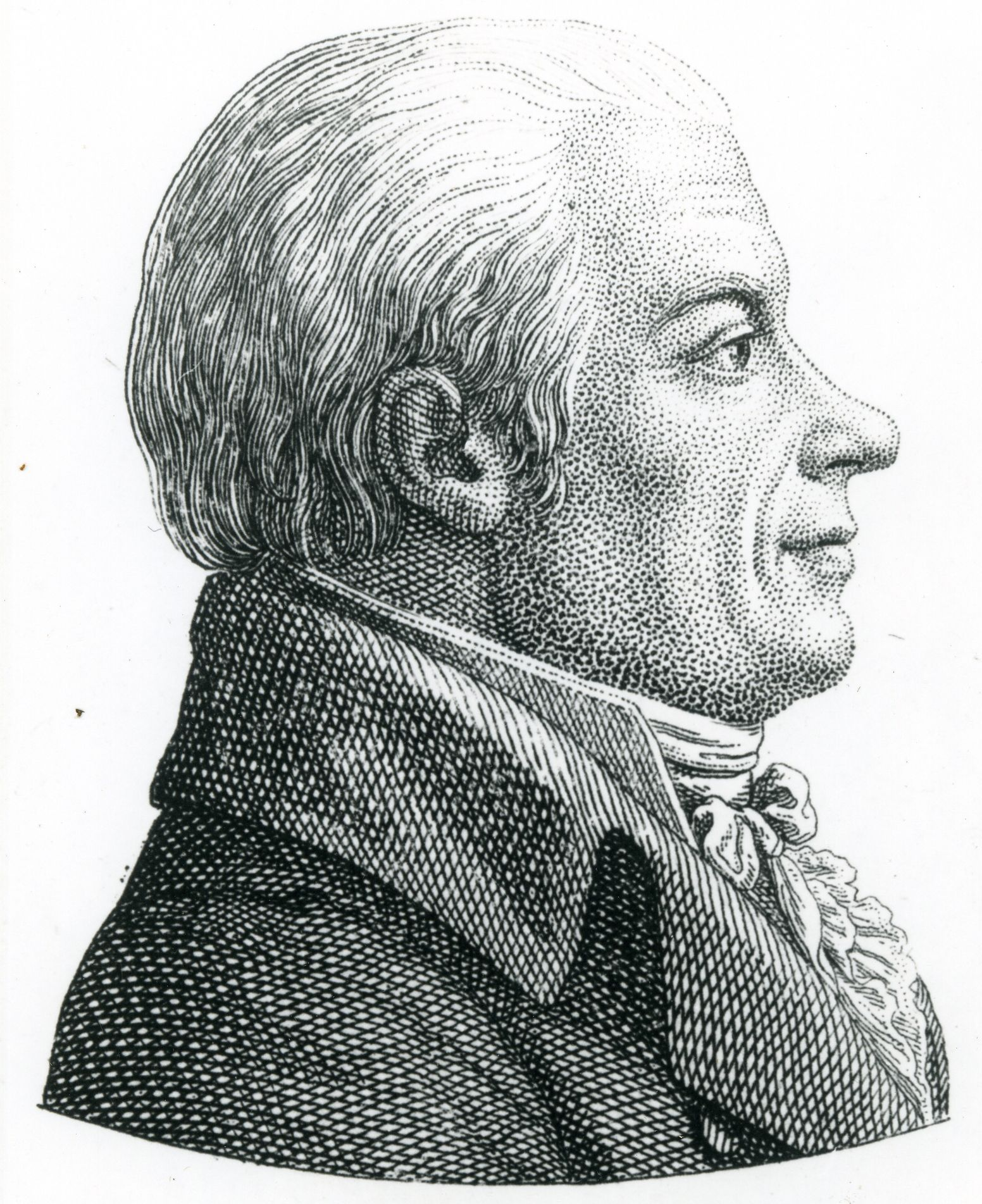
Christoph Wilhelm Mitscherlich.

Christoph Wilhelm Mitscherlich (20 October 1760, in Weissensee (Thuringia) – 6 January 1854, in Göttingen) was a German classical scholar. He wrote several books on ancient Greek literature. He is best remembered for his edition of the Odes and Epodes by the Roman poet Horace.

From 1779 he studied at the University of Göttingen as a pupil of Christian Gottlob Heyne. In 1785 he became an associate professor at Göttingen, where he also worked in the university library. In 1794 he attained a full professorship at the university, and in 1816, 1823/1824 and 1829/1830, he served as vice-rector.

== Selected works ==
- "Scriptores erotici Graeci', (1792–1798); 3 volumes.
  - Volume I. "Achillis Tatii alexandrini De Clitophontis et Leucippes amoribus".
  - Volume II, pt. 1–2. "Heliodori Aethiopicorum".
  - Volume III. "Longi Pastoralium de Daphnide et Chloe, accedunt Xenophontis Ephesiacorum De amoribus Anthiae et Abrocomae".
- "Heliodōrou aithiopikōn biblia deka = Heliodori Aethiopicorum libri decem", (1797); edition of "Aethiopica" by Heliodorus of Emesa, part of series "Scriptores erotici Graeci".
- "Q. Horatii Flacci", (1800), edition of Horace.
