= Die Krokodile =

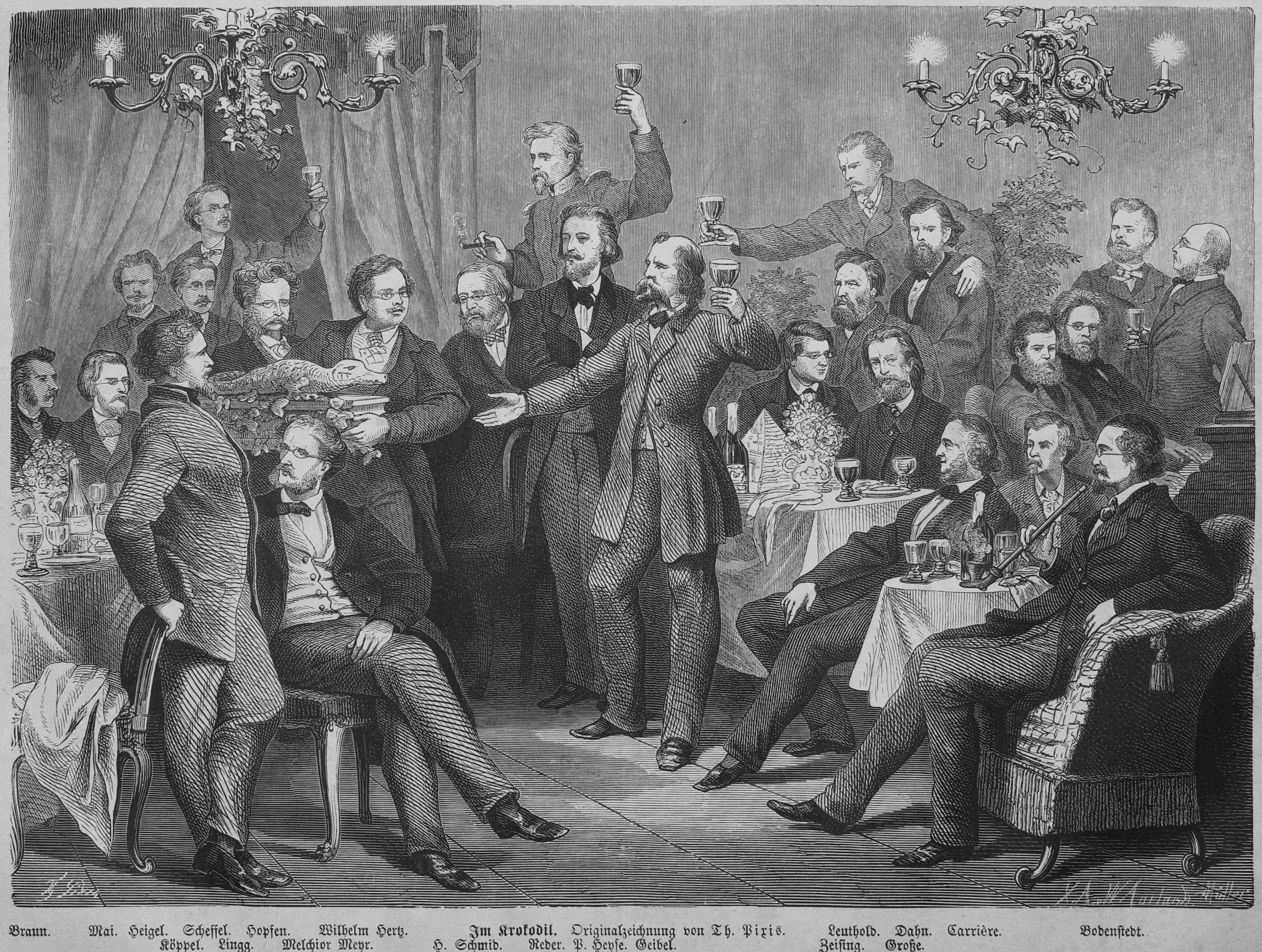

Die Krokodile ('The Crocodiles') was a small poets' society in Munich which existed from 1856 to the 1870s.

== Background and beginnings ==
King Ludwig I had constructed the Glyptothek and the Pinakothek to house art collections. Part of his intention was to attract intellectual luminaries to Munich, with little result before the efforts made by his successor Maximilian II. Among others came the chemist Justus von Liebig, the ethnologist Wilhelm Heinrich Riehl and the historian Heinrich von Sybel.

Two poets who arrived in Munich were Emanuel Geibel and Paul Heyse. In 1852 they joined the cultural society Die Zwanglosen, founded in 1838, which was intended to serve as a meeting-place for both native Bavarians and the new arrivals, the so-called Nordlichter ("northern lights"). However the two groups became fractious and in 1858 Geibel left. Heyse had already created a new society, following the model of the Tunnel über der Spree in Berlin, of which both he and Geibel had been members.

Heyse and Julius Grosse held the inaugural meeting on 5 November 1856 in the coffee-house Zur Stadt München. In the first years Friedrich von Bodenstedt, Felix Dahn, Wilhelm Hertz and Hermann Lingg joined. It was claimed by Felix Dahn that the name of the society came about because of the coincidence that both Geibel and Lingg had recently written poems about crocodiles, but it seems more probable that Lingg's poem Das Krokodil von Singapur was the sole inspiration.

Das Krokodil von Singapur

Im heil'gen Teich zu Singapur
Da liegt ein altes Krokodil
Von äußerst grämlicher Natur
Und kaut an einem Lotusstil.

Es ist ganz alt und völlig blind,
Und wenn es einmal friert des Nachts,
So weint es wie ein kleines Kind,
Doch wenn ein schöner Tag ist, lacht's.

The Crocodile of Singapore

The Holy Pond of Singapore
Contains an ancient Crocodile,
The glummest kind you ever saw:
It chews upon a lotus stem.

It's old and now completely blind,
And when the night is freezing cold,
It weeps just like a little child:
But in the day's warm light it laughs.

"The sublime character of this amphibian seemed to us an admirable example to idealistic poets, and we hoped that in our 'holy pond' we should be able to armour ourselves against the base prosaic world, just as we always used to, minding nothing except maybe changes in temperature." (Paul Heyse: Jugenderinnerungen und Bekenntnisse)

At meetings, recent works both foreign and local were examined and discussed. As in the Tunnel über der Spree, members adopted pseudonyms: Geibel for example was the Urkrokodil. A complete list of members has not survived.

== Literary influence ==
The group is distinguishable from the Young Germany movement by its non-political stance. The Crocodiles preferred to see poetry as a pure and almost sacred art, ideally following ancient, medieval, and even Oriental models; the result was an eclectic body of work, often of the highest craftsmanship but lacking literary substance. Not coincidentally, most of what has survived has been translations and adaptations, such as Bodenstedt's reworking of Oriental sources and Hertz's poems based on medieval material.

After the death of Maximilian II in 1864, policies changed and the grooming of immigrant artists was discontinued. Die Krokodile had lost their main sponsor and public role. An attempt to produce a second group anthology in 1866 was a failure. The society remained in existence chiefly as a social club.

== Members ==
- Max Beilhack (Nashorn)
- Friedrich Bodenstedt (Apis)
- Otto Philipp Braun
- Julius Braun
- Moritz Carrière (Schiff der Wüste)
- Felix Dahn (Gnu) –– Gründungsmitglied
- Hermann Ethé
- Gustav Flörke
- Emanuel Geibel (Urkrokodil)
- Franz Grandaur
- Julius Grosse (Ichnoymon)
- Leonhard Hamm
- Max Haushofer
- Karl August Heigel
- Wilhelm Hemsen (Skarabäus)
- Wilhelm Hertz (Werwolf)
- Paul Heyse (Eidechs)
- Bernhard Hofmann
- Hans Hopfen
- Oskar Horn
- Robert von Hornstein – honorary member
- Wilhelm Jensen
- Konrad Knoll – honorary member
- Franz Koppel-Ellfeld
- Ludwig Laistner
- Karl Lemcke (Hyäne)
- Heinrich Leuthold (Alligator)
- Sigmund Lichtenstein (Nilpferd)
- Hermann Lingg (Teichkrokodil)
- Karl von Lützow (Biber)
- Andreas May
- Melchior Meyr (Ibis)
- Karl Woldemar Neumann (Schwertfisch)
- Ludwig Nohl
- Theodor Pixis – honorary member
- Heinrich Reder
- Adolf Friedrich von Schack – honorary member
- Joseph Victor von Scheffel – honorary member
- Hermann Schmid
- Oskar Schmidt
- Ludwig Schneegans
- August Schricker
- Johann Schrott – honorary member
- Karl Stieler
- Anton Teichlein
- Franz Trautmann
- Robert Vischer
- Gottfried Wandner
- August Westphal
- Richard Weltrich
- Adolf Wilbrandt – honorary member
- Adolf Zeising

== Publications ==
- Emanuel Geibel (ed.): Ein Münchner Dichterbuch, Stuttgart 1862
- Paul Heyse (ed.): Neues Münchner Dichterbuch, Stuttgart 1882

== Bibliography ==
- Véronique de la Giroday: Die Übersetzertätigkeit des Münchner Dichterkreises, Wiesbaden 1978
- Johannes Mahr (ed.): Die Krokodile. Ein Münchner Dichterkreis, Reclam, Stuttgart 1987
- Renate Werner: Gesellschaft der Krokodile. In: Wulf Wülfing et al. (ed.): Handbuch literarisch-kultureller Vereine, Gruppen und Bünde 1825–1933, Metzler, Stuttgart 1998, pp 155–161, ISBN 3-476-01336-7
