= Leimbach =

Leimbach may refer to:

Places

- Leimbach, Haut-Rhin, commune in Haut-Rhin, France
- Leimbach, Aargau, municipality in Switzerland
- Leimbach (Zürich), quarter of the city Zürich in Switzerland
- in Germany:
  - Leimbach, Thuringia, in the Wartburgkreis
  - Leimbach, Ahrweiler, in the district of Ahrweiler, Rhineland-Palatinate
  - Leimbach, Bitburg-Prüm, in the district of Bitburg-Prüm, Rhineland-Palatinate

Rivers

- in Germany:
  - Leimbach (Rhein-Neckar), of Baden-Württemberg, tributary of the River Rhine
  - Leimbach (Dhünn), of North Rhine-Westphalia, tributary of the Dhünn
  - Leimbach (Wupper), of North Rhine-Westphalia, tributary of the Wupper
  - Leimbach (Wehre), of Hesse, tributary of the Wehre

People

- August Leimbach (1882–1965), German-American sculptor
- Marti Leimbach (born 1963), American fiction writer
- Karl Ludwig Leimbach (1844–1905), German educator and literary historian

Other uses

- Leimbachstadion, a stadium in Siegen, Germany
- Leimbach Park, a linear park and flood prevention scheme under construction in Wiesloch, Germany
