= Heyse =

Heyse is a surname of German origin. Notable people with the name include:

- Johann Christian August Heyse (1764–1829), German grammarian and lexicographer, father of Karl
- Karl Wilhelm Ludwig Heyse (1797–1855), German philologist, father of Paul
- Paul Heyse (1830–1914), German writer and translator
- Ulrich Heyse (1906–1970), German U-boat commander in World War II

== See also ==
- Genzsch & Heyse, A.G., a German type foundry established in Hamburg
