= Heinrich Leuthold =

Swiss poet and translator

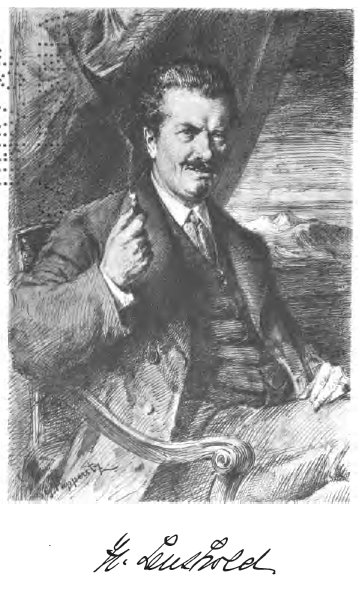
Heinrich Leuthold

Heinrich Leuthold (9 August 1827–1 July 1879) was a Swiss poet and translator, described by one critic as the writer "most endowed with genius" of the Munich literary circle, Die Krokodile.

He was born in Wetzikon. He studied law at Zürich and Basel before moving to Munich in 1857, where he joined the poets' society, Die Krokodile. His extremely critical manner is said to have alienated Paul Heyse. From 1860 he worked as an editor at the Süddeutsche Zeitung, and travelled around Germany for the next few years. In 1862, he published, with Emanuel Geibel, Fünf Bücher französischer Lyrik, a substantial set of volumes containing translations from the French; and in 1868 he wrote an epic, Penthesilea.

In July 1877 he entered the Burghölzli asylum, supposedly after being rejected as a suitor by the granddaughter of Wilhelm von Humboldt, and he died there two years later, shortly after seeing the publication of Gedichte (1879), a volume of original poetry.

Thirty-two of his poems were set in 1944 by Othmar Schoeck as Spielmannsweisen, op. 56, and Der Sänger, op. 57.

== Bibliography ==
- Biographical note in: Alexander Tille, ed. German Songs of Today. Macmillan, London, 1896.
