= Hans Hopfen =

Bavarian poet and novelist (1835–1904)

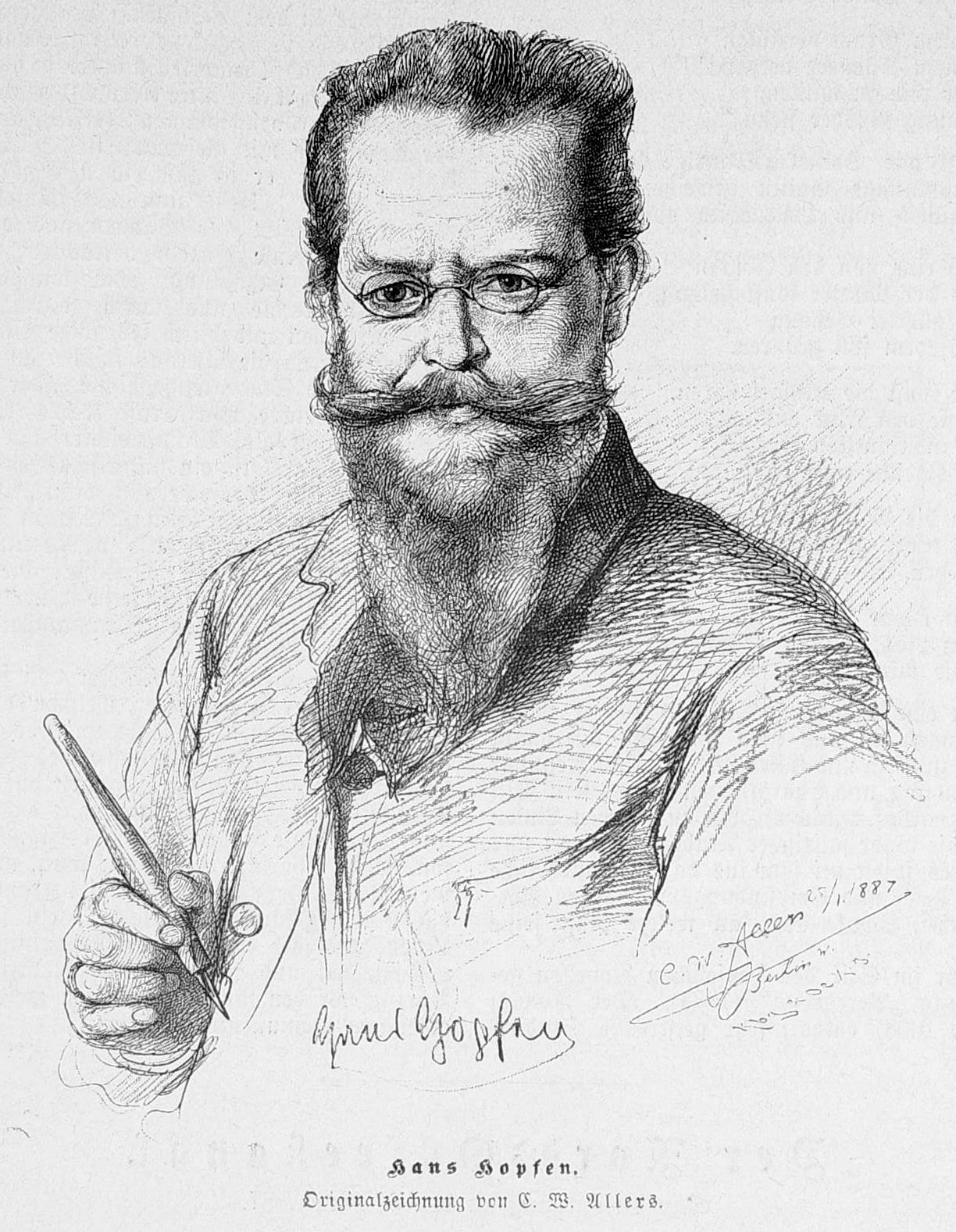
Hans Hopfen (1887), by C. W. Allers

Demetrius Hans (Ritter von) Hopfen (3 January 1835 – 19 November 1904) was a Bavarian poet and novelist.

Hans Hopfen (originally Mayer), the son of Angelotta Mayer (1807-1880), was born in Munich. At the age of 10 he was acknowledged by his father Simon Hopfen. Hans studied law and history from 1853 to 1858 in Munich, where he was a member of the Corps Franconia. He retired from the Bavarian civil service soon after the referendary and began publishing his songs and ballads (Lieder und Balladen) in Emanuel Geibel's Münchener Dichterbuch (1862); he was soon inducted into the Munich circle of writers known as Die Krokodile. By the age of 25 he had earned a reputation as a gifted romantic with his lyrical poems (especially the powerful ballad of the Sendlinger Bauernschlacht, one of the highlights of his career) and the humorous peasant novel Der alte Praktikant. Efforts to further his education led him to Venice in 1862, Paris in 1863, and Vienna in 1864, where he was in close contact with Franz Grillparzer. From 1865-66 he was Secretary General of the German Schiller Foundation (Deutsche Schillerstiftung) in Vienna under the presidency of Paul Heyse. After 1866, he worked as a freelance writer in Berlin. In 1888 he was ennobled by the Prince Regent Luitpold.

He also gained importance as a leading figure of the Verband Alter Corpsstudenten (VAC), founded in 1888 and chaired by Hopfen from 1895 until his death. Soon after taking office, he submitted the plan for a monument dedicated to the German Student Corps at the Rudelsburg to Prince Otto von Bismarck. On 25 June he helped to lay the groundwork for this monument.

He died in Lichterfelde, the suburb of Berlin, on 19 November 1904.

Of Hopfen's lyric poems, Gedichte (4th ed., Berlin, 1883), many are of considerable talent and originality; but it is as a novelist that he is best known. The novels Peregre/ta (1864); Verdorben zu Paris (1868, new ed. 1892); Arge Si/ten (1869); Der graue Freund (1874, 2nd ed., 1876); and Verfehite Liebe (1876, 2nd ed., 1879) are attractive, while of his shorter stories Tiroler Geschichten (1884–1885) command most favour.

An autobiographical sketch of Hopfen is contained in KE Franzos', Geschichte des Erstlingswerkes (1904).

== Works ==
- Peregretta, novel (Berlin 1864)
- Der Pinsel Mings, eine sehr ergötzliche chinesische Geschichte in Versen (Stuttgart 1868)
- Verdorben zu Paris, novel (Stuttgart 1868, 2 vols.)
- Arge Sitten, novel (Stuttgart 1869, 2 vols.)
- Aschenbrödel, play (1869)
- In der Mark, play (1870)
- Der graue Freund, novel (Stuttgart 1874, 4 vols.)
- Juschu. Tagebuch eines Schauspielers (Stuttgart 1875)
- Verfehlte Liebe, novel (Stuttgart 1876, 2 vols.)
- Bayrische Dorfgeschichten (Stuttgart 1878)
- Der alte Praktikant (Stuttgart 1878)
- Die Heirat des Herrn von Waldenberg (Stuttgart 1879, 3 vols.)
- Die Geschichten des Majors (Berlin 1880, 3rd ed. 1882)
- Kleine Leute, short stories (Berlin 1880)
- Mein Onkel Don Juan. Eine Geschichte aus dem vorigen Jahrhundert, historical novel (Berlin 1881)
- Erzählung (Berlin 1881, 2 vols.)
- Die Einsame, short stories (Dresden 1882)
- Gedichte (Berlin 1883)
- Tiroler Geschichten (Dresden 1884-85, 2 vols.)
- Das Allheilmittel (Dresden 1885)
- Ein wunderlicher Heiliger (Leipzig 1886)
- Der letzte Hieb (Stuttgart 1886)
- Robert Leichtfuß (Stuttgart 1888)

== Bibliography ==
- Karl Schindler (1972). "Hopfen, Hans Ritter von". Neue Deutsche Biographie (in German). Vol. 9. Berlin: Duncker & Humblot. pp. 610–611.
