= Gustav Adolf Kröner =

German publisher and chairman (1836-1911)

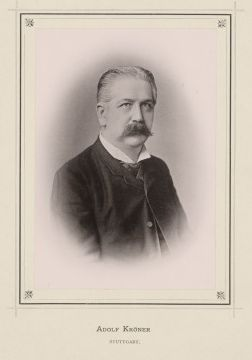
Kröner c. 1900

Gustav Adolf Kröner (born May 26, 1836, in Stuttgart; died January 29, 1911), from 1905 von Kröner, was a German publisher and chairman of the Börsenverein der Deutschen Buchhändler. He became particularly well known for his demand for fixed prices for books, which was implemented in the so-called Kröner Reform and is still in force today. The publishing houses he managed, especially J. G. Cotta'sche Buchhandlung, which he had acquired and expanded in 1889, were also among the most important publishers in the field of humanities and literary publications, especially at the beginning of the 19th century and 20th centuries.

== Family ==
He was the son of the staff officer and late hospital administrator Ludwig Ferdinand Kröner (1807-1862) and Christine Magdalene Ebner (1799-1876). His brothers Carl (1835-1929) and Paul Kröner (1839-1900) were also publishers, like himself. In 1860, Adolf von Kröner married Amalie Mäntler (1838-1905), the daughter of the printshop owner Carl Mäntler (1799-1859) and his wife Emilie Luise, née Brann (1806-1880). He had three children with her, including the two sons Alfred and Robert, with whom he later led his printing houses, and the daughter Alwine, who married the Publisher Heinrich Beck.

== Life and work ==
=== Early years and education ===
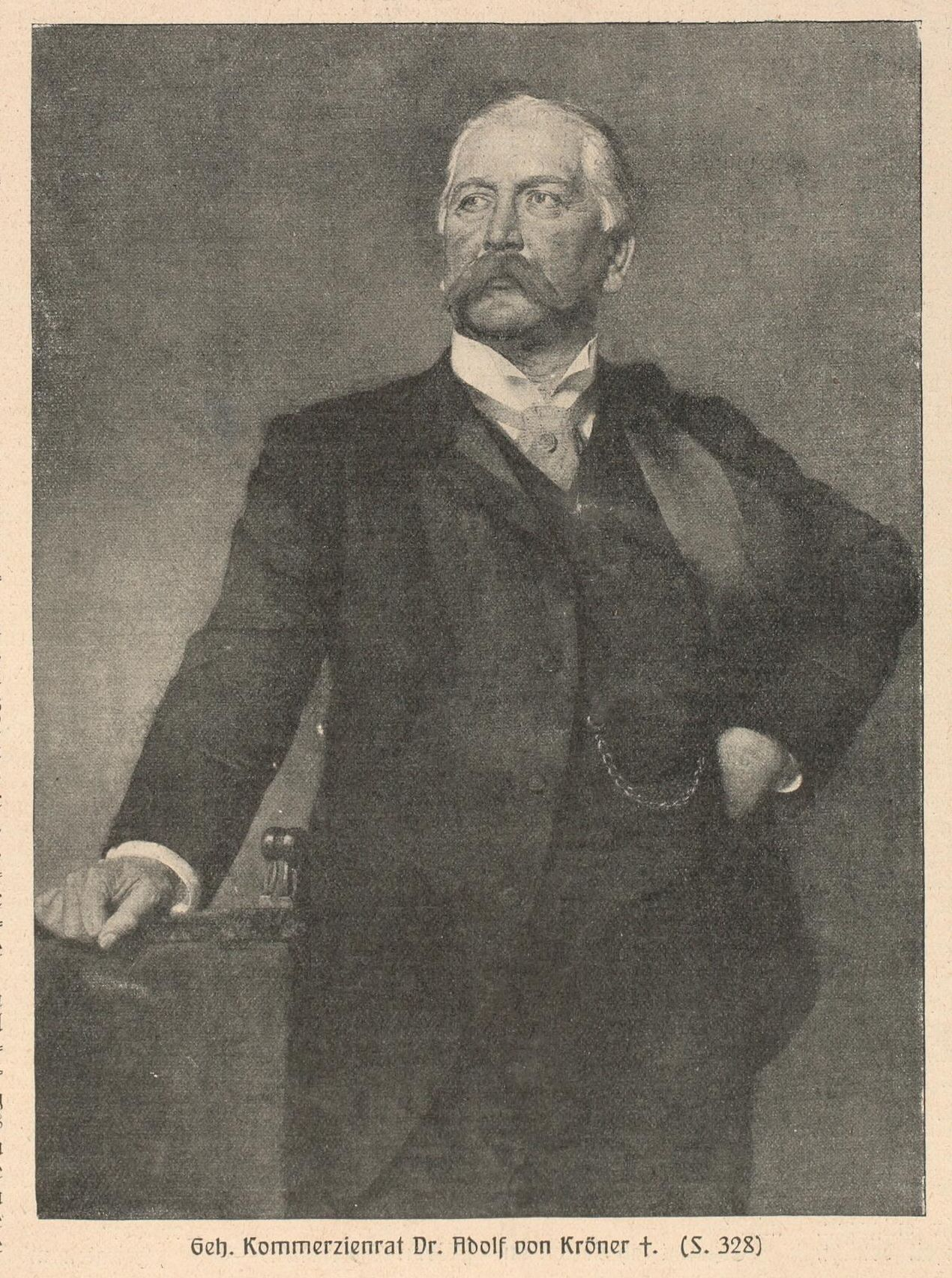
Adolf Kröner (from the 1911 book named "Buch für Alle")

Kröner attended the Eberhard Ludwigs Gymnasium in Stuttgart and in 1853 went to study in Paris with the desire to become an opera singer. Because of financial reasons, he discontinued his studies in music and returned to Stuttgart to take up studies in acting a year later in Leipzig and Weimar. He also discontinued this and finally decided to become a bookseller. In 1855, he began his training in Wilhelm Bach's bookshop in Stuttgart, then moved to L. Boshoyer's store in Cannstatt for a few weeks before starting work as a bookseller's assistant in Munich. Through Wilhelm Hertz and Robert von Hornstein, two childhood friends, he came into contact with the Munich artists' group "Die Krokodile" and was greatly influenced in his literary perception by this literary group led by Emanuel Geibel and Paul Heyse. In 1857 he went back to Stuttgart and worked as a bookkeeper at Franz Malté's Artistic Institute.

=== Early career ===
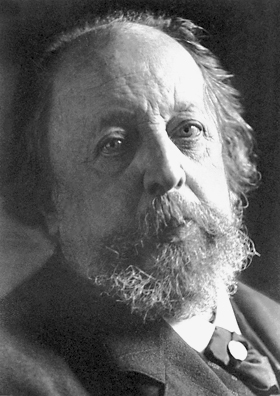
Paul Heyse was one of the first literary figures whose books Kröner published.

In 1859, Adolf Kröner took over the Hof- und Kanzleibuchdruckerei of his father-in-law Carl Mäntler and founded his first publishing house Gebr. Mäntler (A. Kröner) together with his brother Paul in the same year. In 1861, he parted with the printing business and from then on worked only as a publisher and bookseller in the publishing house A. Kröner Verlagsbuchhandlung. His first author was Melchior Meyr, who was followed by the literary figures he met in Munich and whose works he published in the Munich Poets' Book in 1862 and 1863. Wilhelm Hertz, Paul Heyse and above all Hermann Kurz subsequently had their books published by him. In addition, through the purchase of two small publishing houses - Becherscher Verlag in 1864, Krabbescher Verlag in 1870 (according to other sources in 1873) - he also attracted Hans Hopfen, Ernst Eckstein, Wolfgang Menzel and Robert von Hornstein as authors. Carl Kröner, his brother, joined the publishing house as a partner in 1867, while Paul Kröner had already taken over the printing house in 1864. In 1877, the two businesses were brought back together under one roof with the name Gebrüder Kröner, in which Kröner's second brother Karl was also involved, although he left the business again as early as 1883. In addition to the books named, Kröner also published the conservative Schwäbische Volkszeitung. In 1884, Adolf Kröner expanded his business by taking over the publishing house of the late Ernst Keil, who published the journal Die Gartenlaube, and took over the editing of the journal until it was discontinued in 1903. In 1886, his son Alfred also entered the management of the journal and took over its management. Kröner was the first publisher of the journal in Germany. On January 1, 1889, he also took over the J. G. Cotta'sche Buchhandlung in Stuttgart, founded by Johann Georg Cotta, which he had already taken on lease since 1879, and continued to run it as J.G. Cotta'sche Buchhandlung Nachfolger. He had already purchased Cotta'sche Druckerei in 1886, and together with Carl von Cotta he had been publishing Bibliothek der Weltliteratur since 1882. The Allgemeine Zeitung, which he had acquired together with Cotta's publishing house, went to a private limited company (GmbH) in Munich in 1895. In 1890 he founded Union Deutsche Verlagsgesellschaft by combining the publishing houses of Herrmann Schönlein (acquired as early as 1888), Wilhelm Spemann (who was a partner in the publishing house from 1891 to 1897) and one of his own, and took over the management and later the position of chairman of the supervisory board until 1904, when he handed over the management to Heinrich Beck. In 1897, Kröner acquired the architectural publishing house of Arnold Bergsträsser in Darmstadt and united it with the technical publishing house of Cotta'sche Buchhandlung to form a publishing house, which he handed over in 1898 to his son Alfred Kröner, who had already been a partner in Kröner's publishing house since 1892. In 1899, the Cotta'sche Buchhandlung was converted into a private limited company (GmbH) and Adolf Kröner managed it together with his son Robert until his death in 1911. In 1901, a subsidiary was also established in Berlin, making the company's headquarters "Stuttgart und Berlin".

=== Turn of the century ===
In 1901, following the death of Berlin publisher Wilhelm Hertz, Adolf Kröner also took over the latter's program and added it to Cotta'sche Buchhandlung, which now focused only on topics related to the humanities and economics as a result of the spin-off of the technology and natural sciences sectors by his son's Alfred Kröner Verlag publishing house. Among the most important authors in the field of philosophy were Friedrich Theodor Vischer, Friedrich Jodl, Heinrich von Stein, Eduard Engel and Franz Brentano, and in the sector of economics and law Georg von Mayr, Georg Schanz, Lujo Brentano and Walter Lotz. With the latter two, the Münchener volkswirtschaftliche Studien appeared in over 100 volumes from 1893 until Kröner's death. Hermann Oldenberg's Buddha was also published, which became one of the most successful works of the publishing house and continued to appear in new editions until the post-war period of World War II. The historical section was covered by authors such as Heinrich Brunner, Alfred Doren, Veit Valentin, Heinrich Friedjung, Friedrich Meinecke and Erich Marcks, but the central role after 1890 was played by Otto von Bismarck, for whose memoirs Kröner was able to obtain the publishing rights. He then published Die politischen Reden des Fürsten Bismarck (The Political Speeches of Prince Bismarck) in 14 volumes in 1892 and, after Bismarck's death, his Gedanken und Erinnerungen (Thoughts and Reminiscences) in 1898. On the basis of this very great success, Kaiser Wilhelm I and Bismarck was published in 1901, followed by Aus Bismarcks Briefwechsel in 1903 and 1906. In the field of literature, too, there continued to be many interesting titles: from 1902 to 1907, Kröner's Cotta'sche Buchhandlung published the critical complete edition of the literary works of Johann Wolfgang von Goethe in 40 volumes as a "jubilee edition" in memory of Cotta's complete edition (1806-1810), which had appeared almost 100 years earlier. This was then followed in 1904-1905 by a complete edition of Friedrich Schiller's works to commemorate the 100th anniversary of the literary figure's death as the "Säkulärausgabe." In addition, the "Bibliothek der Weltliteratur" (Library of World Literature) was further extended and the Volksbibliothek deutscher Klassiker (People's Library of German Classics) was again revived as the "Cotta'sche Volksbibliothek" (from 1889) / "Cotta'sche Handbibliothek" (from 1902) from the old Cotta program. According to the Neue Deutsche Biographie, however, it was„verhängnisvoll, daß Kröner die neuen Strömungen falsch einschätzte.“ He refused to collaborate with Detlev von Liliencron as well as with Heinrich Mann and Rainer Maria Rilke, and also attempted at a very late stage to get Arthur Schnitzler and Hermann Hesse on his side. Hermann Sudermann provided him with aspirational literature, and he also published Theodor Fontane, Paul Heyse, and Gottfried Keller, who had come to him through the acquisition of Wilhelm Hertz's publishing house in 1901, and Otto Braun published the Cotta'schen Musenalmanach, a cross-section of German literature, from 1891 to 1900.

=== Work for German publishing industry ===
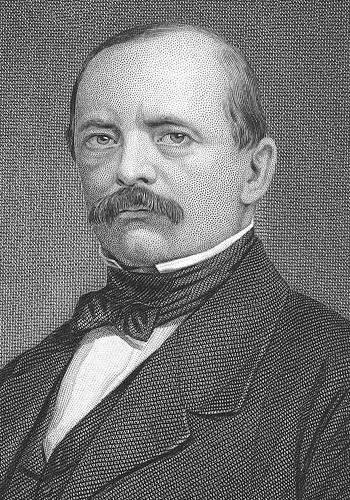
Otto von Bismarck

In addition to his direct work as a publisher, Adolf Kröner worked very intensively for the interests of the German publishing industry and book trade. In 1877, he became Chairman of the South German Booksellers Association as well as the Stuttgart Publishers Association. A year later, he was appointed as a second secretary and, in 1880, deputy chairman of the Börsenverein der Deutschen Buchhändler (now Börsenverein des Deutschen Buchhandels). In 1882, he was chosen First Chairman of the Börsenverein and held this position until 1888 and then again from 1889 to 1892. The Neue Deutsche Biographie refers to Kröner's activities as „bedeutendsten Mann auf diesem Posten in der 2. Jahrhunderthälfte“.

Kröner became "the leader of the reform movement that sought a balance between the centers of Leipzig and Berlin on the one hand and the rest of the German book trade on the other. " The conflict was related to the fact that the publishers of the two bookselling metropolises conducted an intense mail order book trade with high discounts for buyers, thus creating the situation for the Regional Booksellers that buyers ordered books from them for review, but bought them at discounts from the "long-distance slingers" - the small booksellers had correspondingly massive economic problems and had to finance themselves to a great extent from other Sales or Services. Kröner strongly condemned this action: in 1884, he gave his most famous speech at the Börsenverein's general meeting, in which he called for the introduction of fixed book prices for the German book trade and highlighted the advantages for publishers, booksellers and authors:

„Die Schleuderer im Buchhandel, d.h. der Verkauf neuer Bücher an das Publicum zu Preisen, bei welchen nach dem Urtheil unparteiischer Sachverständiger ein solider, über das ganze deutsche Sprachgebiet verbreiteter Sortimentsbuchhandel nicht mehr bestehen kann, ist in ihren Consequenzen gleich nachtheilig für Schriftsteller, Bücherverkäufer und Verleger.“

He requested the establishment of equal market conditions for all booksellers, pointing out that this would be in the interest of all stakeholders. The publisher would thus have the opportunity to offer and sell his books, especially the new titles, all over the country. The booksellers and buyers would benefit especially from the book warehouses, which could be set up in smaller towns with uniform prices. Finally, in the case of authors, the reforms were intended to prevent the exclusion of lesser-known authors.

In 1887, fixed book prices and a number of Kröner's other ideas were introduced at the association's general meeting and introduced a year later; this step is known today as Kröner's reform. Other results of his efforts were a revival of the association's activities, especially at the district and local levels, and the establishment of a commission to advise on complaints about skidding. In 1888, Kröner resigned as 1st chairman and transferred it to the Berlin publisher Paul Parey, who tried to enforce the reform by using coercive measures against the publishers. This plan failed and Parey had to resign as chairman after only one year - to Adolf Kröner, who refused to stand for re-election in 1892 for health reasons.

=== Honors ===
- Honorary citizen of Leipzig (1888) on the occasion of the inauguration of the German Booksellers' House
- Private Councillor of Commerce
- In 1904, he was awarded the Cross of Honor of the Order of the Württemberg Crown, with which the personal title of nobility was associated
- Honorary Doctorate at the University of Tübingen (1909, Dr. phil. h. c.)
- Honorary Doctorate at the Ludwig-Maximilians-Universität München (1909, Dr. oec. publ. h. c.)
- Honorary Member of the German Publishers and Booksellers Association (1909)

=== Memberships ===
Adolf von Kröner was a member of the Corps Teutonia Stuttgart.
