= Karl Stieler =

German lawyer and author (1842–1885)

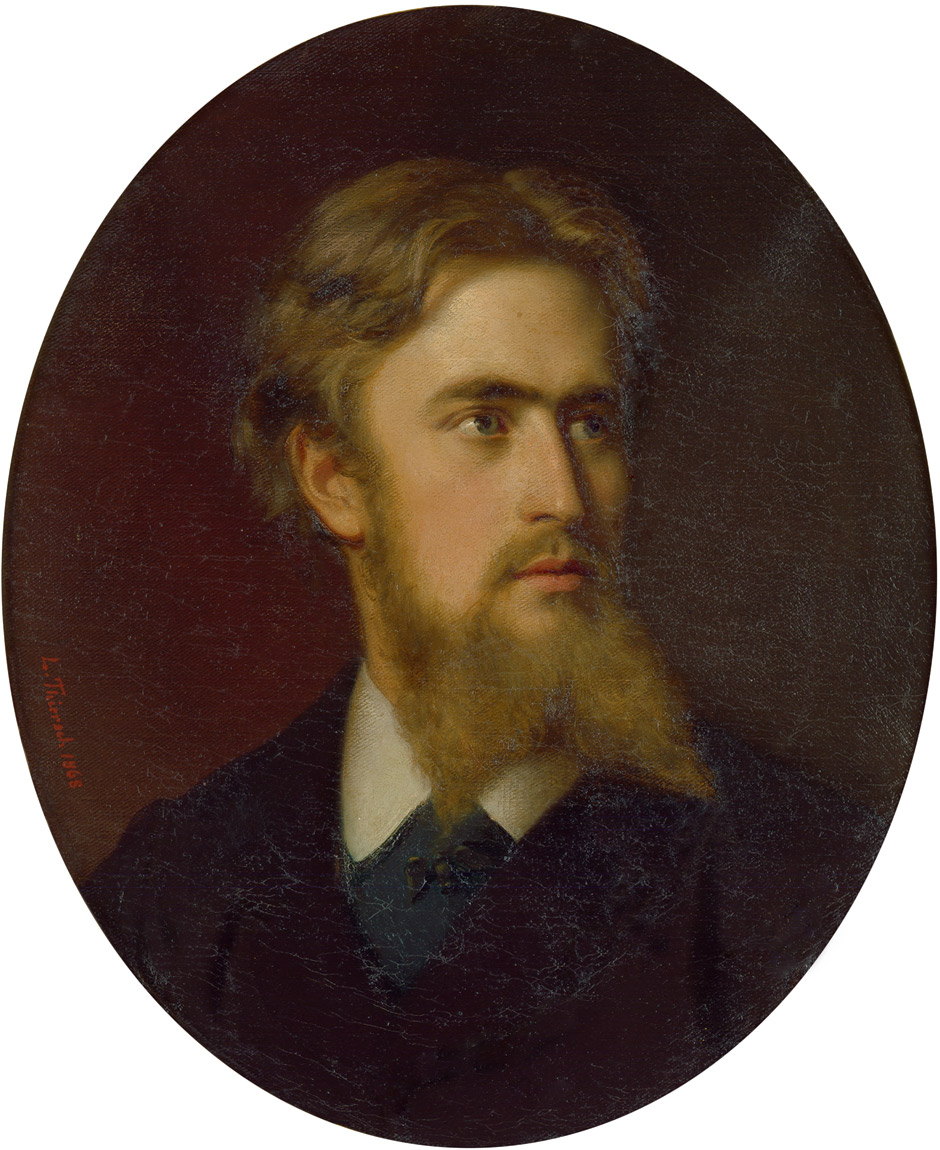
Portrait by Ludwig Thiersch, 1865

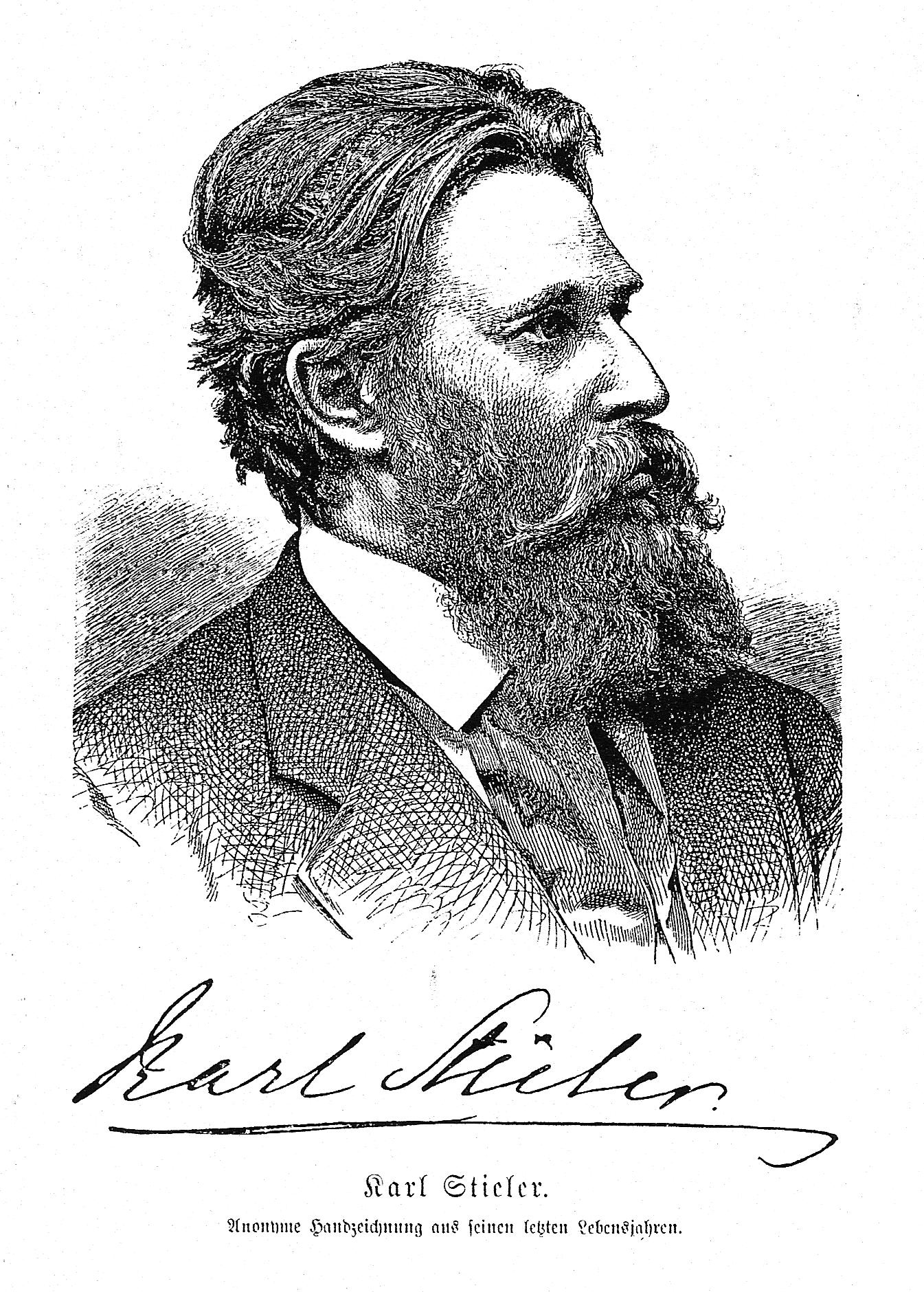
Portrait in Gustav Könnecke's Deutscher Literaturatlas, 1895.

Karl Stieler (15 December 1842 in Munich, Germany – 12 April 1885 in Munich) was a German lawyer and writer.

== Life ==
Stieler was the son of the painter Joseph Karl Stieler and his wife, the poet Josephine von Miller.

After graduating from school, he studied law at the Ludwig-Maximilians-Universität München. He later transferred to Heidelberg University, where he earned his Ph.D. in 1869.

He subsequently worked as a lawyer for about a year, but abandoned that career in favour of extensive travel through Great Britain, France, Switzerland, Belgium, Italy, and Hungary. Stieler earned his living by writing about these journeys, and other articles, mostly for the Allgemeine Zeitung.

Stieler returned to Munich to settle down, where he quickly became acquainted with fellow writers Paul Heyse and Emanuel Geibel; these two introduced him into the Munich literary circle Die Krokodile (The Crocodiles). During these years he became the editor of the Fliegenden Blätter, and was influenced in his writing by Franz von Kobell.

In 1882, Stieler was promoted to Archive Assessor of the Bavarian Public Records Office in Munich. He died of pneumonia there, at the age of 43, on 12 April 1885. At his request, he was buried in Tegernsee.

The community of Tegernsee am Leeberghand commissioned the sculptor Thomas Dennerlein to create a memorial for Stieler.

== Works ==
- Aus deutschen Bergen (1871)
- Aus Fremde und Heimat (1886)
- Bergbleamln (1865)
- Durch Krieg zum Frieden (1886)
- Elsaß-Lothringen (1877)
- Habt's a Schneid? (1877)
- Hochlandlieder (1879)
- A Hochzeit in de Berg (1884)
- In der Sommerfrisch (1883)
- Italien (1875)
- Kulturbilder aus Bayern (1885)
- Natur- und Lebensbilder aus den Alpen (1886)
- Neue Hochlandlieder (1883)
- Rheinfahrt (1877)
- Um Sunnawend' (1878)
- Wanderzeit (1882)
- Aus der Hütten (1887)
- Weidmanns Erinnerungen (1871)
- Weil's mi freut! (1876)
- Winteridyll (1885)
