= Hermann Schmid =

Hermann Schmid may refer to

- Hermann von Schmid (1815–1880), Austrian-German novelist
- Hermann Schmid (computer scientist)
- Hermann Schmid (Esperantist), a German Esperantist
