= Ludwig Laistner =

German writer (1845–1896)

Ludwig Laistner (3 November 1845 – 22 March 1896) was a German novelist, mythologist, and literary historian.

Born in Esslingen am Neckar, he studied theology in Tübingen from 1863 to 1867 and was a pastor for two years before heart trouble obliged him to resign. He took instead a position as a private tutor in Munich, where he joined Die Krokodile, a poets' society, and worked with Paul Heyse on the Neuen deutschen Novellenschatz, a compilation of short stories. From 1880 he devoted himself entirely to literature, eventually becoming the literary advisor of the Cotta publishing house.

He wrote historical novels and poems, and Das Rätsel der Sphinx (1889), a book on mythology from an Idealist perspective which argued that dreams and nightmares were the ultimate source of many famous myths. The book was highly praised by Rudolf Steiner and was a direct predecessor of psychoanalytic interpretation. He was a translator of medieval student songs such as those of the Carmina Burana, and wrote book reviews for Allgemeine Zeitung. His last efforts (1893–96) were on a new edition of the works of Goethe. He died in Stuttgart.

== Works ==
- Barbarossas Brautwerber, epic poem (Stuttgart 1875)
- Nebelsagen (Stuttgart 1879)
- Golias, translations of medieval student songs (Stuttgart 1879)
- Novellen aus alter Zeit (Berlin 1882)
- Der Archetypus der Nibelungen (Munich 1887)
- Das Rätsel der Sphinx (Berlin 1889)
