= Italienisches Liederbuch (Wolf) =

Songs with piano accompaniment by Hugo Wolf

- Lieder collection by Hugo Wolf
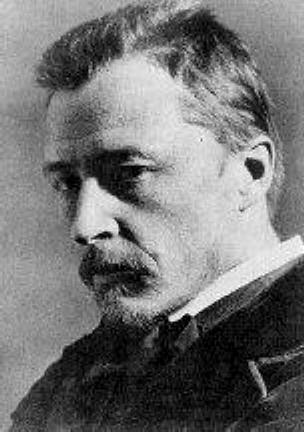
- The composer
- Text: Poems from Paul Heyse's Italienisches Liederbuch
- Language: German
- Composed: 1891–1892, 1896
- Scoring: voice and piano

Italienisches Liederbuch (English: Italian songbook) is a collection of 46 Lieder (songs for voice and piano) by Hugo Wolf, setting poems from Paul Heyse' Italienisches Liederbuch to music. The first 22 songs (Book 1) were composed between September 1890 and December 1891, and published in 1892. The other 24 songs (Book 2) were composed between March and August 1896, and published the same year. The time lag between the two volumes was caused by Wolf's long-proposed opera, Der Corregidor (1895), which might have been inspired by his personal love triangle with his friend's wife Melanie Köchert.

The 46 lyrics of the songs were taken from an anthology of Italian poems by Paul Heyse (1830–1914), translated into German and published with the title of Italienisches Liederbuch in 1860. Despite Heyse’s diverse poetic selections, Wolf preferred the rispetto, a short Italian verse usually consisting of eight lines of ten or eleven syllables each, as a result of which the songs are short.

== Description ==
The songs are composed for voice and piano. They are usually performed alternating by a male and a female singer, as (for example) in the recording of Dietrich Fischer-Dieskau (baritone), Elisabeth Schwarzkopf (soprano), and Gerald Moore (accompanist). In the lyrics, the male in love tends to idealize his lover and praise her beauty, while the female shows practical ideas about love and sometimes has complaints against her lover.

== The poems ==
Wolf-Auch kleine Dinge-Italienisches Liederbuch n 1, performed by Èlia Farreras and Clara Santacana during the 2023 International Course for the Interpretation of Lied Wolfram Rieger in Barcelona

The German texts and some translations are available online at The LiederNet Archive. The poems are listed below:

Book 1

1. Auch kleine Dinge
2. Mir ward gesagt, du reisest in die Ferne
3. Ihr seid die Allerschönste
4. 'Gesegnet sei, durch den die Welt entstund
5. Selig ihr Blinden
6. Wer rief dich denn?
7. Der Mond hat eine schwere Klag' erhoben
8. Nun laß uns Frieden schließen
9. Daß doch gemalt all' deine Reize wären
10. Du denkst mit einem Fädchen
11. Wie lange schon war immer mein Verlangen
12. Nein, junger Herr
13. Hoffärtig seid Ihr, schönes Kind
14. Geselle, woll'n wir uns in Kutten hüllen
15. Mein Liebster ist so klein
16. Ihr jungen Leute
17. Und willst du deinen Liebsten sterben sehen
18. Heb' auf dein blondes Haupt
19. Wir haben beide
20. Mein Liebster singt
21. Man sagt mir, deine Mutter woll' es nicht
22. Ein Ständchen Euch zu bringen

Book 2

1. Was für ein Lied soll dir gesungen werden
2. Ich esse nun mein Brot nicht trocken mehr
3. Mein Liebster hat zu Tische mich geladen
4. Ich ließ mir sagen
5. Schon streckt' ich aus im Bett die müden Glieder
6. Du sagst mir daß ich keine Fürstin sei
7. Wohl kenn' ich Euren Stand
8. Laß sie nur geh'n
9. Wie soll ich fröhlich sein
10. Was soll der Zorn
11. Sterb' ich, so hüllt in Blumen meine Glieder
12. Und steht Ihr früh am Morgen auf
13. Benedeit die sel'ge Mutter
14. Wenn du, mein Liebster, steigst zum Himmel auf
15. Wie viele Zeit verlor' ich
16. Wenn du mich mit den Augen streifst
17. Gesegnet sei das Grün
18. O wär' dein Haus durchsichtig wie ein Glas
19. Heut' Nacht erhob ich mich um Mitternacht
20. Nicht länger kann ich singen
21. Schweig' einmal still
22. O wüßtest du, wie viel ich deinetwegen
23. Verschling' der Abgrund
24. Ich hab' in Penna einen Liebsten wohnen
