= Karl Theodor Gaedertz =

German librarian and literary historian

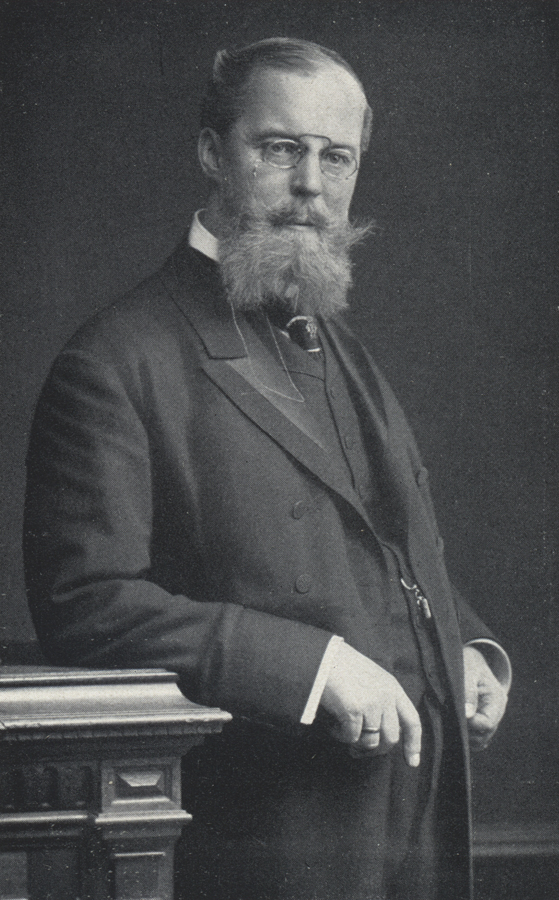
Karl Theodor Gaedertz

Karl Theodor Gaedertz (8 January 1855 in Lübeck – 8 July 1912 in Berlin) was a German librarian and literary historian, best known for his writings on the Low German author Fritz Reuter.

From 1876 to 1879 he studied at the universities of Leipzig and Berlin, then later worked as a librarian at the Königliche Bibliothek in Berlin. In 1888 he found a notebook copied from Shakespearian times, showing the layout of an Elizabethan playhouse in London. This represents the only known depiction of the internal layout of a London theatre and is much prized by the Globe. From 1900 to 1905 he was head librarian at the Greifswald University Library. In 1909 he returned to Berlin, where he died on 8 July 1912.

== Selected works ==
- Gabriel Rollenhagen, sein Leben und seine Werke, 1881 – Gabriel Rollenhagen, his life and works.
- Das niederdeutsche Schauspiel: Zum Kulturleben Hamburgs, 1884 – The Low German theater: the cultural life of Hamburg.
- Fritz Reuter-Studien, 1885 – Fritz Reuter studies.
- Fritz Reuter-Reliquien, 1885 – Fritz Reuter relics.
- Emanuel Geibel: Denkwürdigkeiten, 1886 – Emanuel Geibel, memoirs.
- Zur Kenntnis der altenglischen Bühne nebst andern Beiträgen zur Shakespeare-Litteratur, 1888 – On the old English stage, with other contributions to Shakespearean literature.
- Goethe und Maler Kolbe: Eine kunsthistorische Skizze, 1889 – Goethe and painter Heinrich Christoph Kolbe: an art-historical sketch.
- Aus Fritz Reuters jungen und alten Tagen. Neues über des Dichters Leben und Werden auf Grund ungedruckter Briefe und Dichtungen mitgetheilt 1896 – On Fritz Reuter's youth and old age.
