= Italienisches Liederbuch =

Italienisches Liederbuch (English: Italian songbook) is a collection of translations of anonymous Italian poems and folk songs into German by Paul Heyse (1830–1914). It was first published in 1860.

In 1892, the composer Hugo Wolf (1860–1903) published a collection of 22 Lieder (settings for voice and piano) on poems from the volume, also under the title Italienisches Liederbuch. In 1896, he published a second collection, containing a further 24 Lieder.
