= Julius Grosse =

German poet (1828–1902)

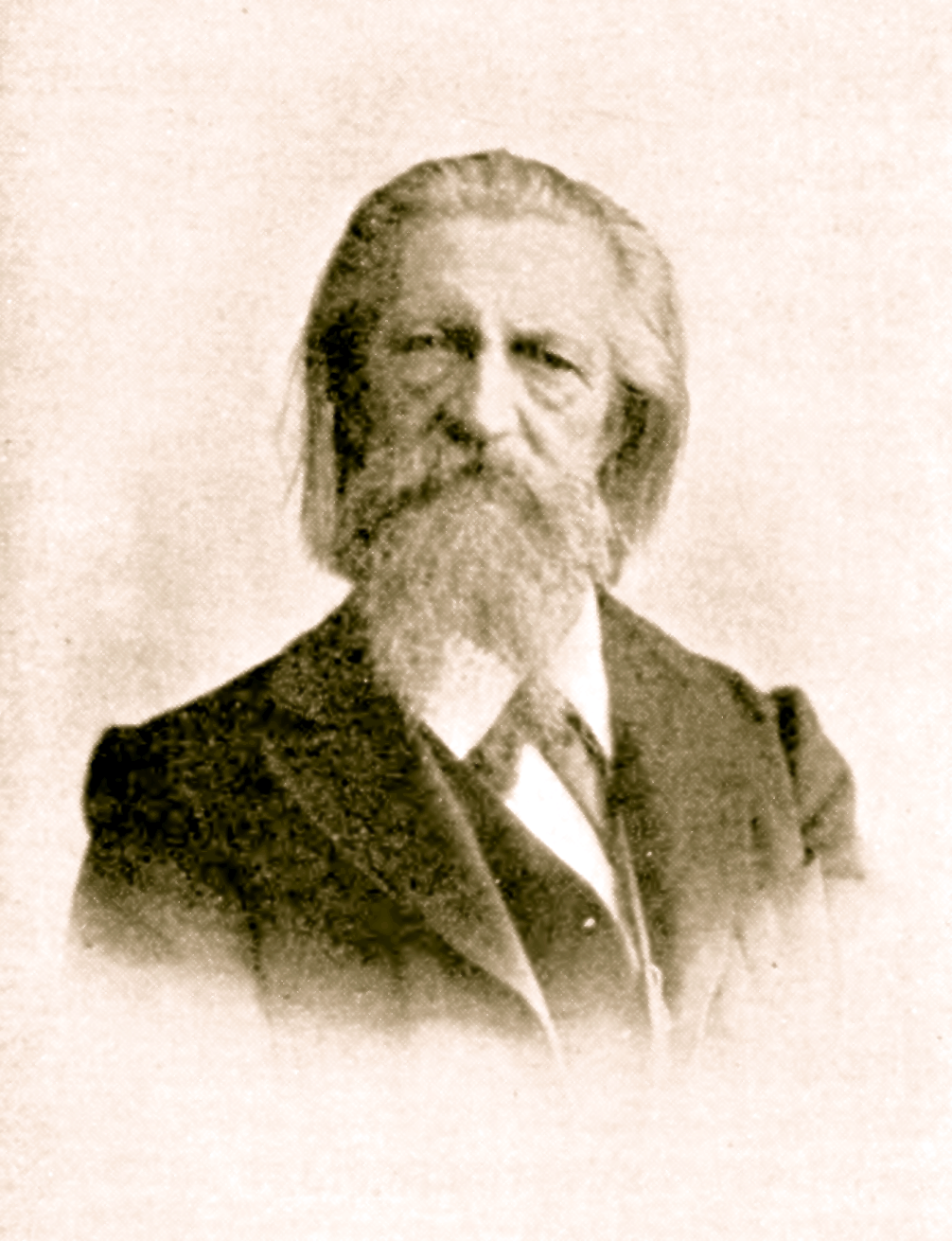
Julius Grosse.

Julius Waldemar Grosse (25 April 1828 – 9 May 1902), German poet, the son of a military chaplain, was born at Erfurt.

== Biography ==
He received his early education at the gymnasium in Magdeburg, and on leaving school and showing disinclination for the ministry, entered an architect's office. But his mind was bent upon literature, and in 1849 he entered the university of Halle, where, although inscribed as a student of law, he devoted himself almost exclusively to letters. His first poetical essay was with the tragedy Cola di Rienzi (1851), followed in the same year by a comedy, Eine Nachtpartie Shakespeares, which was at once produced on the stage.

The success of these first two pieces encouraged him to follow literature as a profession, and proceeding in 1852 to Munich, he joined the circle of young poets of whom Paul Heyse and Hermann Lingg (1820–1905) were the chief. For six years (1855–1861) he was dramatic critic of the Neue Münchener Zeitung, and was then for a while on the staff of the Leipziger Illustrierte Zeitung, but in 1862 he returned to Munich as editor of the Bayrische Zeitung, a post he retained until the paper ceased to exist in 1867.

In 1869 Grosse was appointed secretary of the Schiller-Stiftung, and lived for the next few years alternately in Weimar, Dresden and Munich, until, in 1890, he took up his permanent residence in Weimar. He was made Grand-ducal Hofrat and had the title of professor. He died at Torbole on the Lago di Garda on 9 May 1902.

Grosse was a most prolific writer of novels, dramas and poems. As a lyric poet, especially in Gedichte (1857) and Aus bewegten Tagen, a volume of poems (1869), he showed himself more to advantage than in his novels, of which latter, however, Untreu aus Mitleid (2 vols, 1868); Vox populi, vox dei (1869); Maria Mancini (1871); Neue Erzahlungen (1875); Sophie Monnier (1876), and Ein Frauenlos (1888) are remarkable for a certain elegance of style. His tragedies, Die Ynglinger (1858); Tiberius (180); Johann von Schwaben; and the comedy Die steinerne Braut, had considerable success on the stage.

Grosse's Gesammelte dramatische Werke appeared in 7 vols in Leipzig (1870), while his Erzahlende Dichtungen were published at Berlin (6 vols, 1871–1873). See also his autobiography, Literarische Ursachen und Wirkungen (1896); R Prutz, Die Literatur der Gegenwart (1859); J Eth, J. Grosse all epischer Dichter (1872).
