= Theodor Pixis =

German painter, graphic artist, illustrator and etcher

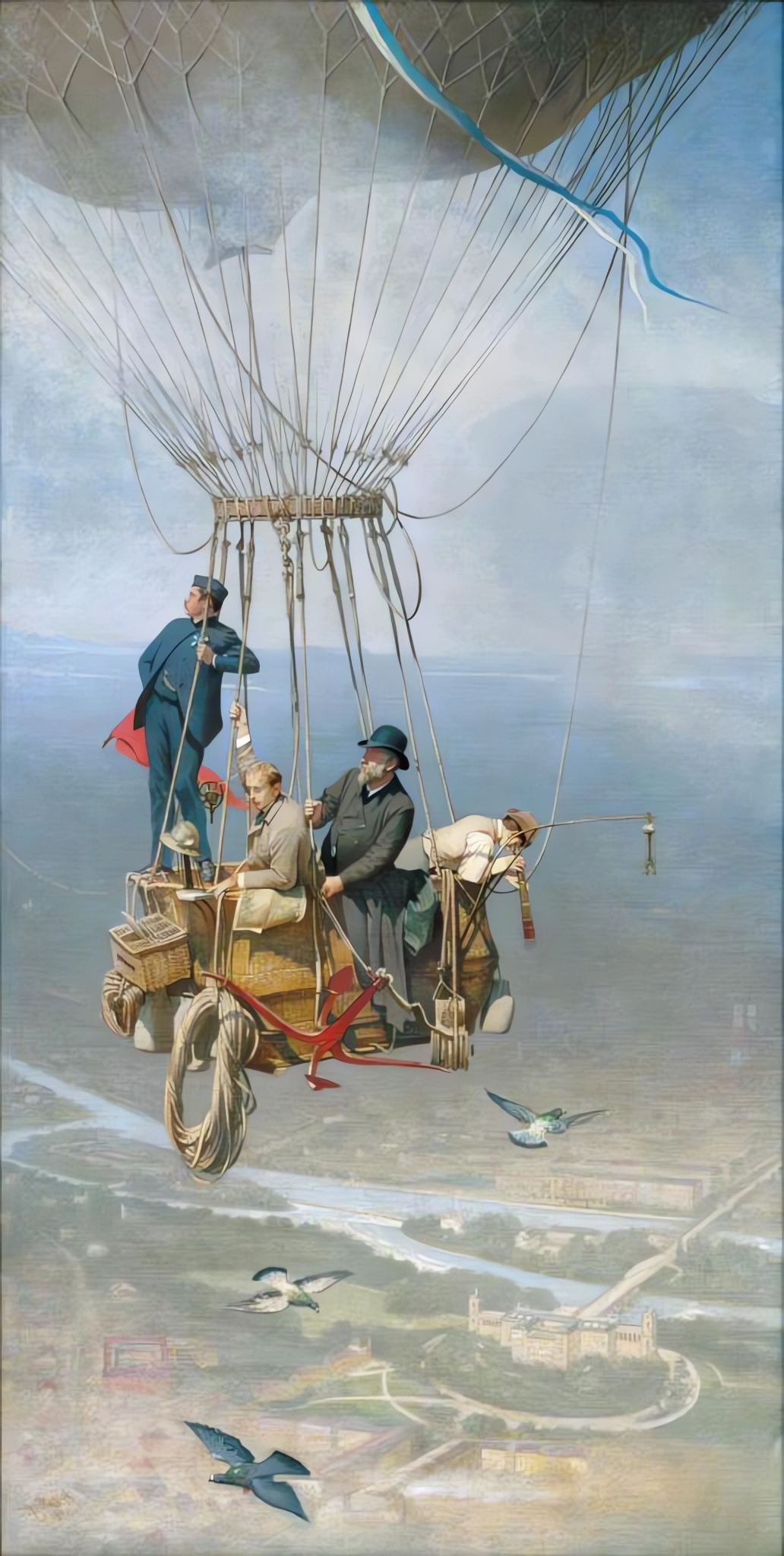
Tausend Meter über München, 1890. On the far left is Karl von Brug, a pioneer of aviation in Bavaria.

August Ludwig Theodor Pixis (1 July 1831 – 19 July 1907) was a German painter, graphic artist, illustrator and etcher.

He was born in Kaiserslautern. After graduating from the Wilhelmsgymnasium in Munich in 1849, he began studying law. He soon turned to art, and became a pupil of the painters Philipp von Foltz and Wilhelm von Kaulbach. Pixis made his debut in 1854 with his painting Coriolanus.

Funded and supported by his teachers, Pixis left in 1856 for two years of study in Italy. In the autumn of 1858 Pixis returned to Germany and settled in Munich. One of his first major works after his return was a cycle of illustrations for the Gudrun legend. From 1859 Pixis was instrumental in the decoration of the Bavarian National Museum. At the request of Maximilian II, Pixis created three paintings from the histories of Charles X and Charles XI. From 1862 onwards there came in rapid succession many pictures which were highly praised by critics, such as Calvin meets Servetus in prison, as well as illustrations for a cycle of German folk songs. For the Bruckmann publishing house, Pixis created three images for the Schiller-Galerie and four representations of the seasons. He illustrated Paradise Lost by John Milton, and contributed to the Wagner-Galerie. King Ludwig II commissioned Pixis to create a series of pen drawings illustrating the music dramas of Richard Wagner. Here he proved himself very much a master student of Kaulbach. His large oil paintings show the influence of the elegant and sentimental manner of Arthur von Ramberg.

He was also known for the invention of the process known as Pixis painting (Pixis-Patentmalerei). With the aid of photographs, oil paintings (old and new masters) could be reproduced more easily. But after a few years, his complicated process was replaced by simpler methods.

At the age of 76 years Theodor Pixis died in Pöcking. His grave is located at Waldfriedhof in Munich (22–W–1). Three streets are named after Theodor Pixis: A Pixisstraße in Munich and Pöcking and a Theodor-Pixis-Straße in Kaiserslautern.
