= Leimbach (Wehre) =

River in Germany

Location
- Country: Germany
- States: Hesse

Physical characteristics
- Mouth
  - location: Wehre
  - coordinates: 51.1569°N 9.9929°E

Basin features
- Progression: Wehre→ Werra→ Weser→ North Sea

Leimbach is a small river of Hesse, Germany. It is a right tributary of the Wehre in Reichensachsen.

The source of the river is located south of the Blauen Kuppe in the nature reserve of the same name at an altitude of approximately 288 meters (945 ft). The flow direction is southwest to Langenhain. There the Leimbach turns in a northwestern direction towards Reichensachsen and flows into the Wehre river on the western edge of the town. It overcomes a height difference of 90 meters (300 ft) and flows over a distance of 3.7 kilometers (2.3 mi).

== See also ==
- List of rivers of Hesse
