= Leimbach (Dhünn) =

River in Germany

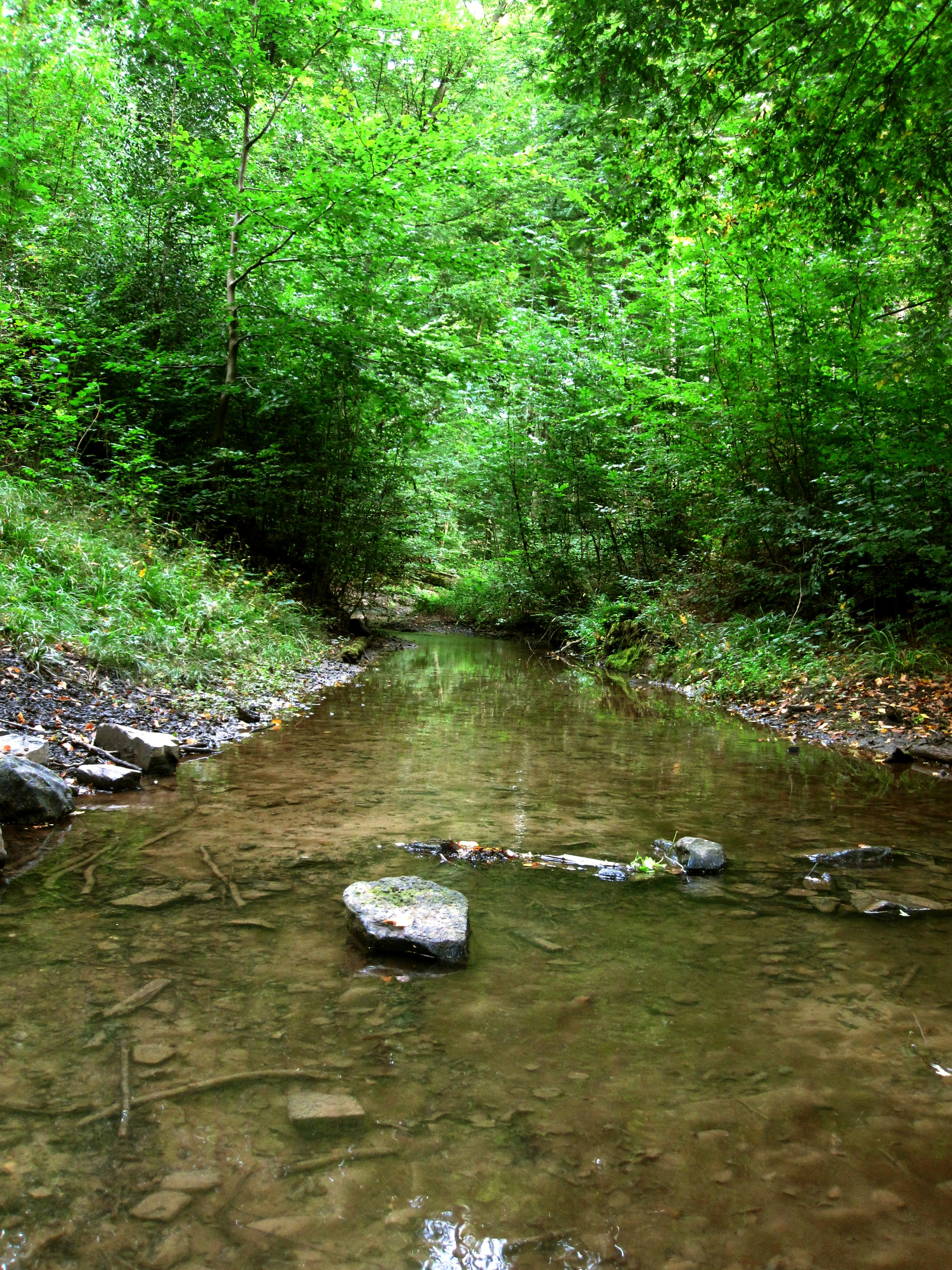

Location
- Country: Germany
- State: North Rhine-Westphalia

Physical characteristics
- Source
  - elevation: 190 m (620 ft)
- Mouth
  - location: Dhünn
  - coordinates: 51.0303°N 7.0625°E
  - elevation: 62 m (203 ft)
- Length: 6.1 km (3.8 mi)

Basin features
- Progression: Dhünn→ Wupper→ Rhine→ North Sea

Leimbach is a river of North Rhine-Westphalia, Germany. It is a right tributary of the Dhünn.

== See also ==
- List of rivers of North Rhine-Westphalia
