= Karl Wilhelm Ludwig Heyse =

German philologist

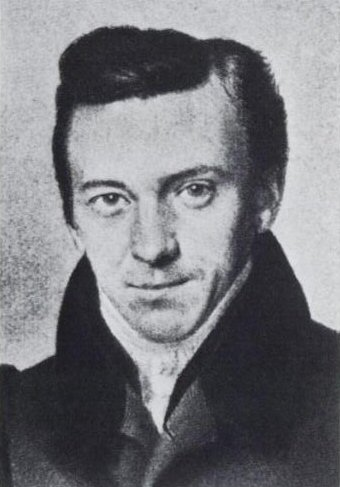
Karl Wilhelm Ludwig Heyse.

Karl Wilhelm Ludwig Heyse (15 October 1797, Oldenburg – 25 November 1855, Berlin) was a German philologist, son of Johann Christian August Heyse, father of the novelist Paul Johann Ludwig von Heyse, born at Oldenburg.

== Biography ==
He received his early education at gymnasiums in Oldenburg and Nordhausen, and from 1812 to 1815, studied at a private institute in Vevey, Switzerland. After briefly serving as a tutor to the youngest son of Wilhelm von Humboldt, he enrolled in classes at the University of Berlin (1816). Here, he studied philology under August Böckh. From 1819 to 1827, he was a private tutor to the family of banker Abraham Mendelssohn Bartholdy (including Felix Mendelssohn).

In 1827 he received his habilitation at the University of Berlin, where in 1829, he became an associate professor. At Berlin, he lectured on Greek and Latin literature, the philosophy of language and general linguistics.

After his father's death (1829), he revised a number of the elder Heyse's works, including the fifth edition of "Theoretisch-praktischer deutscher Grammatik" with the title, "Ausführliches Lehrbuch der deutschen Sprache" (volume 1, 1838; volume 2, 1849). He also edited the tenth edition of his father's "Theoretisch-praktischer deutscher Schulgrammatik" (1832). The three-volume "Handwörterbuch der deutschen Sprache" (1833-1849), although prepared by the elder Heyse, was essentially his own work. Among his original writings was "System der Sprachwissenschaft", a book edited and published in 1856 by Heymann Steinthal.
