= Karl Ludwig Leimbach =

German educator and literary historian

Karl Ludwig Leimbach (18 May 1844, in Treysa – 30 December 1905, in Hanover) was a German educator and literary historian.

He studied theology and philology at the University of Marburg and later worked as a schoolteacher in Schmalkalden, Hanover and Bonn. In 1876 he was named director of a secondary school in Goslar, and later served as Provinzialschulrat (provincial councilor) for schools in Breslau (from 1894) and Hanover (from 1900).

== Published works ==
From 1883 to 1903 he published a series of works on German poetry, titled Ausgewählte deutsche Dichtungen für Lehrer und Freunde der Litteratur. His other literary efforts include:

- Beiträge zur Abendmahlslehre Tertullians, 1874 – Contributions to the Eucharistic doctrine of Tertullian.
- Das Papiasfragment : exegetische Untersuchung des Fragmentes (Eusebius, Hist. eccl. III, 39, 3-4) und Kritik der gleichnamigen Schrift von ... Dr. Weiffenbach, 1875 – The Papias fragment, exegetical study of the fragment.
- Ueber den christlichen Dichter Caelius Sedulius und dessen Carmen paschale, 1879 – About the Christian poet Caelius Sedulius and his Carmen paschale.
- Emanuel Geibels Leben, Werke und Bedeutung für das deutsche Volk, 1894 – Emanuel Geibel's life, works and significance for the German people.
- Das Kaiserhaus zu Goslar Kurze Angaben über seine Geschichte, Wiederherstellung und Ausschmückung, 1901 – The imperial house at Goslar; the brief details of its history, restoration and design.
- Luthers Käthe : Vortrag, im Lutherischen Verein für Hannover, Linden und Umgegend, 1906 – Luther's Käthe : Lectures, a Lutheran association for Hanover, Linden and surrounding areas.
