= Johann Christian August Heyse =

German grammarian and lexicographer

Johann Christian August Heyse (21 April 1764 in Nordhausen – 27 June 1829 in Magdeburg) was a German grammarian and lexicographer. He was the father of philologist Karl Wilhelm Ludwig Heyse (1797–1855), who edited and revised several of the elder Heyse's works.

From 1783 to 1786 he received his education at the University of Göttingen. He later was a schoolteacher in Oldenburg (from 1792), an academic rector in Nordhausen (from 1807) and a school director in Magdeburg (from 1819 until his death).

== Selected works ==
He is chiefly known for his work in the field of German school grammar. He wrote:

- "Kleine theoretisch-praktische deutsche Grammatik : ein Auszug aus dem grössern Lehrbuche der deutschen Sprache" (3rd edition 1821).
- "Theoretisch-praktische deutsche grammatik" (4th edition 1827).
- "Leitfaden zum Unterricht in der deutschen Sprache" (twenty-fifth edition, 1885).
- "Deutsche Schulgrammatik", (twenty-sixth edition by Otto Lyon, 1900).
- "Allgemeines verdeutschendes und erklärendes Fremdwörterbuch : mit Bezeichnung der Aussprache und Betonung der Wörter nebst genauer Angabe ihrer Abstammung und Bildung (19th edition by Otto Lyon, 1910).

== See also ==
- Heyse's rules for spelling “S” sounds
