= Wilhelm Heinrich Riehl =

German journalist (1823–1897)

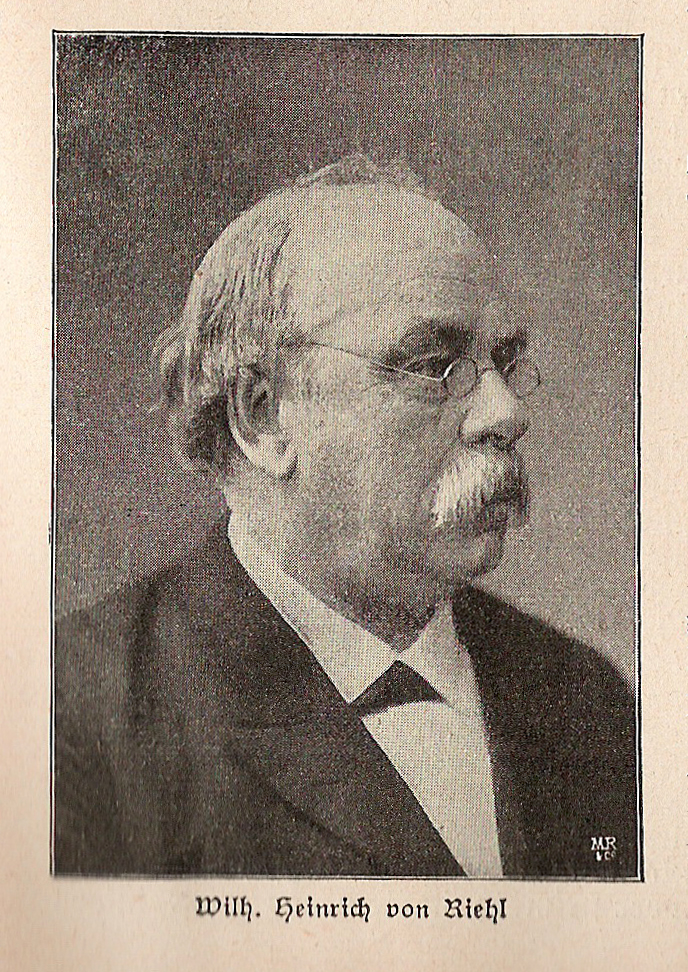
Wilhelm Heinrich Riehl

Wilhelm Heinrich Riehl (6 May 1823, Biebrich – 16 November 1897, Munich) was a German professor, journalist, novelist, and folklorist.

== Academic career ==
Riehl was born in Biebrich in the Duchy of Nassau and died in Munich. Riehl was born into a settled middle-class background, was a professor at the Ludwig-Maximilians-Universität München, and later a curator of Bavarian antiquities.

== Volkish thought ==
According to George Mosse "Riehl's writings became normative for a large body of Volkish thought." Riehl desired a hierarchical society that patterned after the medieval estates. In Die bürgerliche Gesellschaft (Bourgeois Society) he accused those of Capitalist interest of "disturbing ancient customs and thus destroying the historicity of the Volk."

Riehl argued that the 'working class' were the most respectable Volk, since they were best attuned to nature itself. Throughout his work, Riehl displays a strong conviction that the German people and land are intrinsically connected to one another. He also is considered the founder of the "German ethnographic Volkskunde" and drew many of his conclusions in his work from his personal experiences hiking throughout Germany.

== Bibliography ==
- George Peabody Gooch History and Historians in the Nineteenth Century (1913)
- Liulevicius, Vejas G. War Land on the Eastern Front: Culture, National Identity and German Occupation in World War I. Cambridge: Cambridge University Press, 2004.
- Mosse, George L. The Crisis of German Ideology: Intellectual Origins of the Third Reich. New York: Grosset & Dunlap, 1964.
