= Melchior Meyr =

German writer and philosopher (1810–1871)

- Born: 28 June 1810; Wallerstein-Ehringen
- Died: April 22, 1871 (aged 60); Munich
- Occupations: Poet, novelist, philosopher

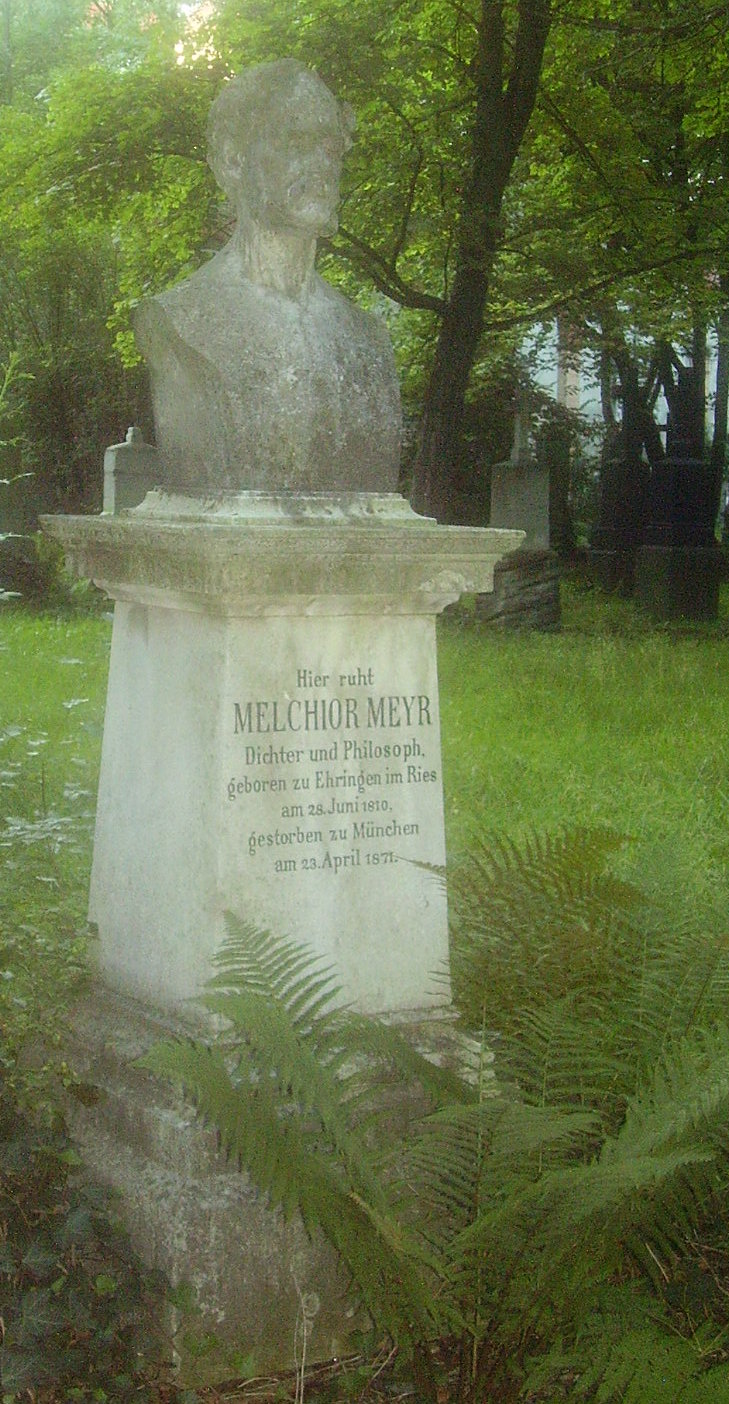
Grave of Melchior Meyr

Melchior Meyr (28 June 1810 in Wallerstein-Ehringen – 22 April 1871 in Munich) was a German poet, novelist and philosopher.

== Life ==
He read law and philosophy at Heidelberg and Munich. His greatest success was the Erzählungen aus dem Ries (4th ed. Leipzig, 1892), remarkable as an accurate and sympathetic picture of rural life and character.

He wrote also tragedies (Herzog Albrecht, 1851; Karl der Kuhne, 1862), novels (Vier Deutsche, 1861; Ewige Hebe, 1864), and, in later life, philosophical works with a strong religious tendency. Among these were Emilie (philosophical dialogues, 1863), Die Religion des Geistes (1871), Die Fortdauer nach dem Tode (1869), Die Religion und ihre jetzt gebotene Fortbildung (1871), and Gedanken über Kunst, Religion und Philosophie (1874). In these works he attempted to develop a Deistic system of philosophy. He was also the author of an Anonymous work entitled Gespräche mit einem Grobian (1866).

He is buried on the Old Southern Cemetery in Munich.

== 1911 Britannica Reference ==
Graf Bothmer and M. Carrière, eds., Melchior Meyr. Biographisches, Briefe und Gedichte, (Leipzig, 1874).
