= Hermann von Schmid =

German writer (1815–1880)

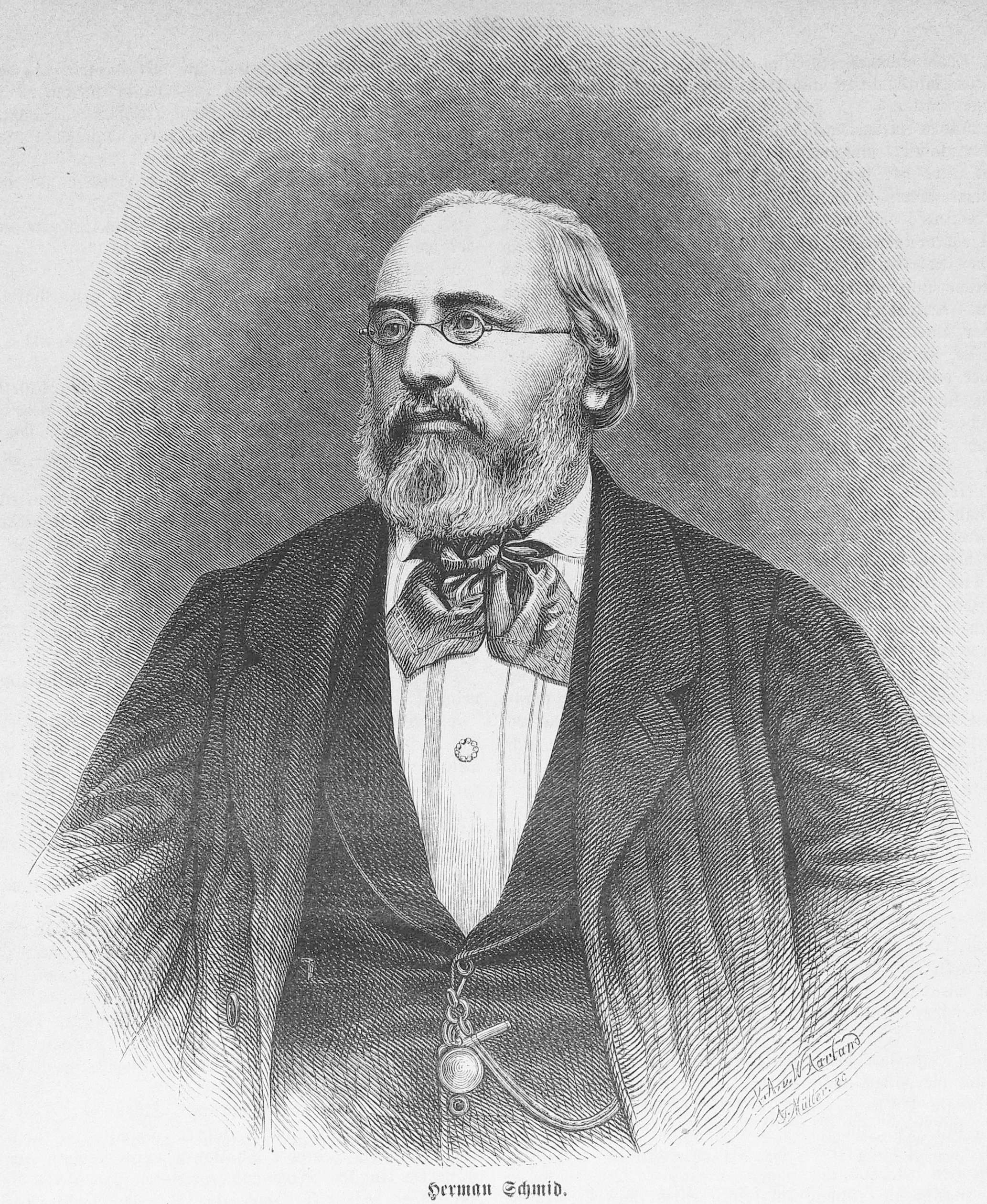
Engraving of Hermann von Schmid, from Die Gartenlaube, 1867.

Hermann Theodor von Schmid (also Hermann Schmid; 30 March 1815 – 19 October 1880) was an Austrian-German novelist, dramatist, and theatre director.

== Life ==
Schmid was born in Waizenkirchen (now in Austria, but at that time still in Bavaria) and studied law at Ludwig-Maximilians-Universität München (LMU), where he obtained his doctorate and entered the judiciary.

He began his literary career as a dramatist with Camoëns and Bretislav (1843), which caught the attention of the Bavarian king Ludwig I and led to a position at the court theatre. After the Revolution of 1848, his support for Johannes Ronge and the failure of his marriage caused him professional difficulties, and he was obliged to retire from the service, moving into a two-storey house at the head of the Tegernseer Landstraße in the south-east of the city.

Schmid obtained great popularity in the 1860s as a prolific writer of historical novels based on events in Austrian and Bavarian history. He was granted the Order of St Michael in 1869, the next year was appointed director of the Volkstheater on Gärtnerplatz, resigning the position after a few years. He was ennobled in 1876.

He died in Munich, where today a street bears his name.

== Work ==
His plays, collected in 1853, include several historical dramas, such as Karl Stuart and Columbus, but his greater success was in portraying peasant life, as in Die Z'widerwurz'n (1878) and Der Tatzelwurm (1880). In his novels, too, such as Almenrausch und Edelweiss, Der Habermeister, he was at his best when describing Bavarian customs. His most ambitious work was his lyric epic Winland oder die Fahrt um's Glück (1877).

His collected works appeared in 50 volumes (Leipzig, 1873–1884).

== List of works ==
- Camoens, drama, 1843
- Bretislav, drama, 1843
- Karl Stuart I., tragedy, 1845
- Herzog Christoph der Kämpfer, drama, 1847
- Straßburg (or Eine deutsche Stadt) 1849
- Liebesring, libretto, 1847
- Columbus, 1857
- Fürst und Stadt (1858, later under the title Münchener Kindeln)
- Huberbäuerin, 1860
- Das Schwalberl, peasant novel, 1860
- Theuerdank, comedy, 1861
- Alte und Neue Geschichten aus Bayern, stories, 1861
- Mein Eden, novel, 1862
- Die Türken in München, novel, 1862
- Der Kanzler von Tirol, novel in three volumes, 1863
- Im Morgenroth, novel, 1864
- Der Jägerwirth von München, novel, 1864
- Almenrausch und Edelweiß, novel, 1864
- Im Morgenrot. Eine Münchener Geschichte aus der Zeit Max Joseph's III, 1864
- Baierischen Geschichten aus Dorf und Stadt, stories in two volumes, 1864
- Der bayrische Hiesel. Volks-Erzählung, 1865
- Friedel und Oswald, novel in three volumes, 1866
- Der Tatzelwurm, folk play, 1866
- Almenrausch und Edelweiß, folk play, 1867
- Sankt Barthelmä, novel, 1868
- Mütze und Krone, novel in five volumes, 1869
- Das Münchener Kindel. Erzählung aus der Zeit des Kurfürsten Ferdinand Maria, 1874
- Concordia, novel in five volumes, 1875
- Der Bauernrebell. Roman aus der Tirolergeschichte, 1876
- Winland oder die Fahrt um's Glück, lyric epic, 1876
- Zum grünen Baum, novel, unfinished

== Bibliography ==
- Holland, Hyacinth (1890). "Schmid, Hermann von" . Allgemeine Deutsche Biographie (in German). Vol. 31. Leipzig: Duncker & Humblot. pp. 664–670.
- Gilman, D. C.; Peck, H. T.; Colby, F. M., eds. (1905). "Schmid, Hermann von" . New International Encyclopedia (1st ed.). New York: Dodd, Mead.
