= Emanuel Geibel =

German poet and playwright (1815–1884)

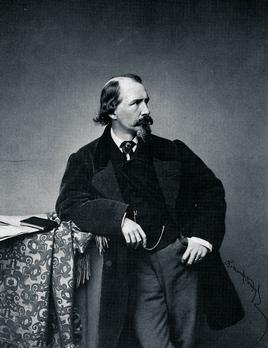
- Born: Emanuel von Geibel; 17 October 1815; Lübeck, Schleswig-Holstein, Germany
- Died: 6 April 1884 (aged 68)
- Occupations: Poet; playwright
- Spouse: Amanda Trummer (m. 1852)
- Children: 1

Emanuel von Geibel (17 October 1815 – 6 April 1884) was a German poet and playwright.

== Life ==
Geibel was born at Lübeck, the son of a pastor. He was originally intended for his father's profession and studied at Bonn and Berlin, but his real interests lay not in theology but in classical and romance philology. In 1838 he accepted a tutorship at Athens, where he remained until 1840. In the same year he published, in conjunction with his friend Ernst Curtius, a volume of translations from Greek. His first poems were published in a volume entitled Zeitstimmen in 1841. In 1842 he entered the service of Frederick William IV, the king of Prussia, with an annual stipend of 300 thalers; under whom he produced König Roderich (1843), a tragedy, König Sigurds Brautfahrt (1846), an epic, and Juniuslieder (1848), lyrics in a more spirited and manlier style than his early poems.

In 1851, Geibel was invited to Munich by Maximilian II of Bavaria as an honorary professor at the university, and he relinquished his Prussian stipend. While in Munich he was at the center of the literary circle called Die Krokodile (Crocodile Society), which was concerned with traditional forms. In 1852 he married Amanda Trummer and the next year they had a daughter, Ada Marie Caroline. A volume of Neue Gedichte, published at Munich in 1857, and principally consisting of poems on classical subjects, denoted a further considerable advance in his objectivity. The series was worthily closed by the Spätherbstblätter, published in 1877. He had left Munich in 1869 and returned to Lübeck, where he remained until his death.

His works further include two tragedies, Brunhild (1858, 5th ed. 1890), and Sophonisbe (1869), and translations of French and Spanish popular poetry (Spanisches Liederbuch (1852), with Paul Heyse). Beginning as a member of the group of political poets who heralded the revolution of 1848, Geibel was also the chief poet to welcome the establishment of the Empire in 1871. His strength lay not, however, in his political songs but in his purely lyric poetry, such as the fine cycle Ada and his popular love-songs. He may be regarded as the leading representative of German lyric poetry between 1848 and 1870.

His poem Schön Ellen was set to music by Max Bruch. Johannes Brahms set one of Geibel's paraphrases after Spanish poetry in the second of his Two Songs for Voice, Viola and Piano.

== See also ==
- Gustav Adolf Kröner

== Bibliography ==
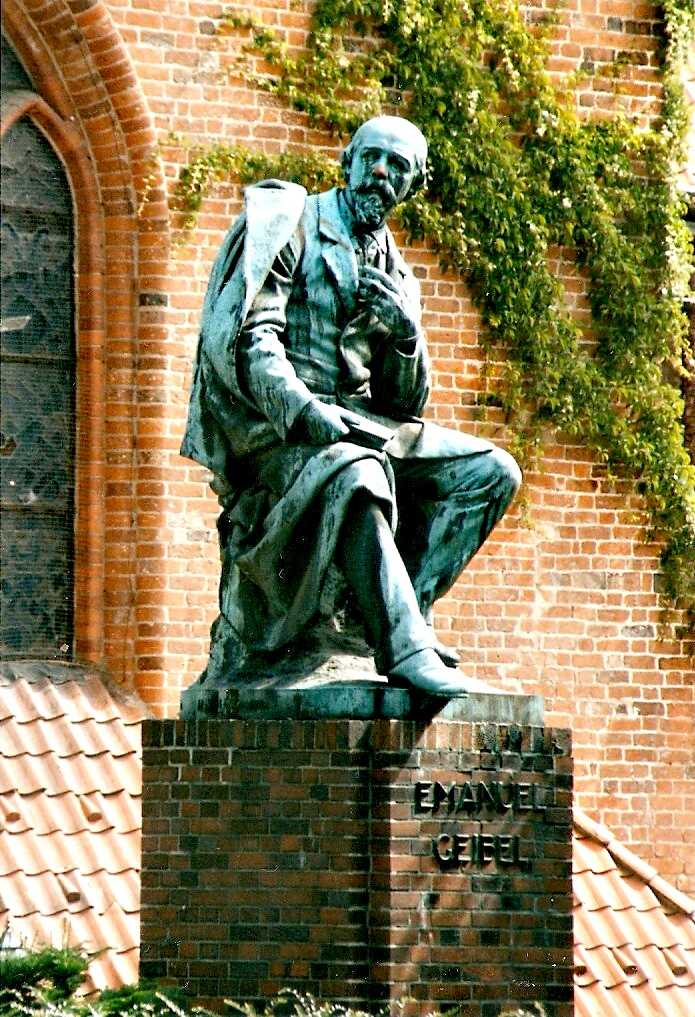
in Lübeck

- Gesammelte Werke published in 8 vols (1883, 4th ed. 1906)
- The Gedichte have gone through about 130 editions.
- A selection of his poems in one volume appeared in 1904.

For biography and criticism, see

- Karl Goedeke, E Geibel (1869)
- Wilhelm Scherer's address on Geibel (1884)
- Karl Theodor Gaedertz, Geibel-Denkwurdigkeiten (1886)
- Carl Conrad Theodor Litzmann, E Geibel, aus Erinnerungen, Briefen und Tagebüchern (1887)
- Biographies by Karl Ludwig Leimbach (2nd ed., 1894), and K. T. Gaedertz (1897).
