= Wilhelm Hertz =

German writer (1835–1902)

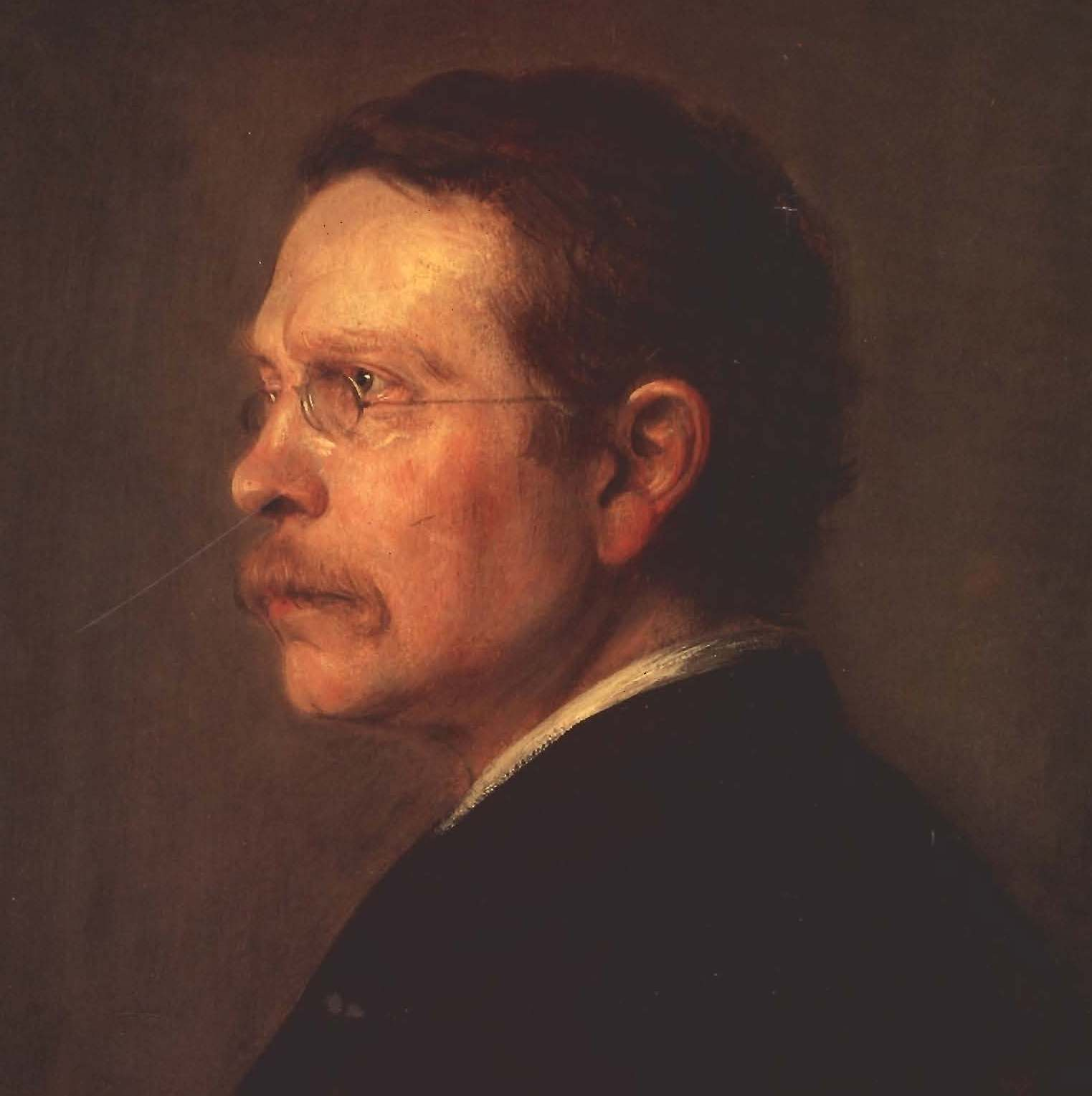
Wilhelm Hertz

Wilhelm Ritter von Hertz (24 September 1835 – 7 January 1902) was a German writer. He was born in Stuttgart.

== Literary works ==
- Dramatische Märchenspiele (between 1847 and 1848)
- Lancelot und Ginerva (1860)
- Das Rolandslied (1861)
- Der Werwolf (1862; ISBN 3-253-02684-1)
- Marie de France (1862)
- Hugdietrichs Brautfahrt (epic from 1863)
- Aucassin und Nicolette (translation from 1865)
- Heinrich von Schwaben (epic from 1867)
- Gottfried von Straßburg (translation from 1877)
- Bruder Rausch (epic from 1882) (ISBN B0000BRKXY)
- Spielmannsbuch (translation from 1886) (ISBN 3-253-02624-8)
- Am Grabe der Mutter
- Ezzelin (presumed lost)
- Geist der Jugend from Album für Deutschlands Töchter

== Literary References ==
- Hermann Greiner: Wilhelm Hertz – ein Tübinger Franke (Tübingen 1996)
- Gerhard Hay: W. Hertz in Neue deutsche Biographie, Bd. 8. (Hrsg.: Historische Kommission der bayrischen Akademie der Wissenschaften) (Berlin 1969)
- Isolde Kurz: Aus meinem Jugendlande (Tübingen 1975)
- Erich Müller: Wilhelm Hertz als Epiker (Dissertation München 1922)
- Helene Raff: Wilhelm Hertz – Zum 100. Geburtstag des schwäbischen Dichters (In: Stuttgarter Neues Tagblatt, Nr. 444) (21. September 1935)
- Rudolf Reiser: Thomas Mann – ein vergessener TH-Student (In: Süddeutsche Zeitung, Nr. 32) (4 February 1994)
- Kurt von Stutterheim: Wilhelm Hertz als Lyriker (Dissertation Tübingen 1913)
