= Members of the Bavarian Maximilian Order for Science and Art =

Members of the Bavarian Maximilian Order for Science and Art, awarded to acknowledge and reward excellent and outstanding achievements in the fields of science and art. It is based in Bavaria, Germany.

== Members ==
=== 1853–1932 ===
- 1853
  - Science: Andreas von Baumgartner († 1865), August Boeckh († 1867), Johann Caspar Bluntschli († 1881), Joseph Andreas Buchner († 1854), Friedrich Creuzer († 1858), Ignaz von Döllinger († 1890), Wilhelm von Dönniges († 1872), Christian Gottfried Ehrenberg († 1876), Carl Friedrich Eichhorn († 1854), Johann Franz Encke († 1865), Johann Nepomuk Fuchs († 1856), Carl Friedrich Gauß († 1855), Jacob Grimm († 1863), Joseph von Hammer-Purgstall († 1856), Friedrich von Hermann († 1868), Carl Friedrich Hermann († 1855), Alexander von Humboldt († 1859), Justus von Liebig († 1873), Carl von Martius († 1868), Hugo von Mohl († 1872), Johannes Müller († 1858), Georg Simon Ohm († 1854), Leopold Ranke († 1886), Friedrich von Raumer († 1873), Carl Ritter († 1859), Friedrich Carl von Savigny († 1861), Friedrich Wilhelm von Schelling († 1854), Friedrich Christoph Schlosser († 1861), Gotthilf Heinrich von Schubert († 1860), Carl Theodor von Siebold († 1885), Carl August von Steinheil († 1870), Friedrich Wilhelm von Thiersch († 1860), Friedrich Wöhler († 1882), Ferdinand Wolf († 1866)
  - Art: Albrecht Adam († 1862), Anton von Auersperg (Anastasius Grün) († 1876), Peter von Cornelius († 1867), Sebastian von Daxenberger (Karl Fernau) († 1878), Franz von Dingelstedt († 1881), Joseph von Eichendorff († 1857), Emanuel von Geibel († 1884), Franz Grillparzer († 1872), Heinrich Hess († 1863), Peter Hess († 1871), Wilhelm von Kaulbach († 1874), Leo von Klenze († 1864), Franz von Kobell († 1882), Franz Lachner († 1890), Carl Friedrich Lessing († 1880), Heinrich Marschner († 1861), Giacomo Meyerbeer († 1864), Johann Friedrich Overbeck († 1869), Christian Rauch († 1857), Ernst Rietschel († 1861), Friedrich Rückert († 1866), Julius Schnorr von Carolsfeld († 1872), Johann von Schraudolph († 1879), Karl Simrock († 1876), Louis Spohr († 1859), August Stüler († 1865), August von Voit († 1870), Joseph Christian von Zedlitz († 1862), Friedrich Ziebland († 1873)
- 1854
  - Science: Christian August Brandis († 1867), Eilhard Mitscherlich († 1863), Karl Gustav Homeyer († 1874), Johann von Lamont († 1879), Adolf Friedrich von Schack († 1894)
  - Art: Justinus Kerner († 1862)
- 1855
  - Science: Gustav Lejeune-Dirichlet († 1859), Friedrich Diez († 1876)
- 1857
  - Science: Wilhelm von Haidinger († 1871), Friedrich Gottlieb Welcker († 1868), Heinrich von Sybel († 1895), Christian Lassen († 1876)
- 1858
  - Science: Theodor von Bischoff († 1882), Immanuel Bekker († 1871)
  - Art: Moritz von Schwind († 1871), Moritz Hauptmann († 1868)
- 1859
  - Science: Georg Heinrich Pertz († 1876), Max von Pettenkofer († 1901), Wilhelm Weber († 1891)
  - Art: Friedrich Hitzig († 1881), Hans Christian Andersen († 1875)
- 1860
  - Science: Ludwig von Döderlein († 1863), Jacob Henle († 1885)
  - Art: Friedrich Hebbel († 1863), Gustav Freytag († 1895)
- 1861
  - Science: Hieronymus von Bayer († 1876), Carl Georg von Wächter († 1880), Ludwig Häusser († 1867)
  - Art: Ernst Hähnel († 1891)
- 1862
  - Art: Eligius von Münch-Bellinghausen (Friedrich Halm) († 1871), Ernst Deger († 1885), Ferdinand Hiller († 1885), Eduard Mörike († 1875)
- 1863
  - Science: Hermann Kopp († 1892), Wilhelm Wackernagel († 1869)
  - Art: Friedrich von Bodenstedt († 1892), August Riedel († 1883)
- 1864
  - Art: Oskar von Redwitz († 1891)
- 1865
  - Science: Wilhelm von Giesebrecht († 1889), Robert Bunsen († 1899), Franz Bopp († 1867)
- 1866
  - Science: Friedrich Ritschl († 1876), Wilhelm Roscher († 1894), Hermann von Helmholtz († 1894)
  - Art: Carl von Piloty († 1886), Bonaventura Genelli († 1868)
- 1867
  - Science: Georg Ludwig von Maurer († 1872), Leonhard von Spengel († 1880), Christoph Friedrich von Stälin († 1873), Heinrich Leberecht Fleischer († 1888)
  - Art: Ludwig Knaus († 1910)
- 1869
  - Science: Heinrich Wilhelm Dove († 1879), Robert von Mohl († 1875), Richard Lepsius († 1884)
  - Art: Karl Schnaase († 1875), Friedrich Preller († 1878)
- 1870
  - Science: Georg Waitz († 1886), August Wilhelm von Hofmann († 1892)
  - Art: Friedrich Drake († 1882)
- 1871
  - Science: Gustav Rose († 1873), Theodor Mommsen († 1903), Ferdinand Gregorovius († 1891)
  - Art: Johann Heinrich Strack († 1873), Paul Heyse (resigned 1887, † 1914), Andreas Achenbach († 1910), Wilhelm Heinrich von Riehl († 1897)
- 1872
  - Science: Hermann Kolbe († 1884), Franz Neumann († 1895), Paul von Roth († 1892)
  - Art: Fritz Reuter († 1874)
- 1873
  - Science: Carl Ernst von Baer († 1876), Emil Du Bois-Reymond († 1896)
  - Art: Richard Wagner († 1883), Johannes Brahms († 1897), August von Kreling († 1876), Gottfried von Neureuther († 1887)
- 1874
  - Science: Alexander Braun († 1877), Ernst Eduard Kummer († 1893)
  - Art: Adolph von Menzel († 1905), Johannes Schilling († 1910), Hermann von Lingg († 1905), Joseph Victor von Scheffel († 1886)
- 1875
  - Science: Friedrich Max Müller († 1900), Ernst von Brücke († 1892)
  - Art: Theophilos von Hansen († 1891)
- 1876
  - Science: Friedrich von Spiegel († 1905), Konrad von Maurer († 1902), Carl von Hegel († 1901), Ludwig von Seidel († 1896)
  - Art: Berthold Auerbach († 1882), Gottfried Keller († 1890), Franz von Lenbach († 1904)
- 1877
  - Science: Carl Wilhelm von Nägeli († 1891), Gustav Kirchhoff († 1887), Carl von Halm († 1882), Johann Gustav Droysen († 1884)
- 1878
  - Science: Carl Ludwig († 1895)
  - Art: Franz Defregger († 1921), Reinhold Begas († 1911), Robert Franz († 1892)
- 1879
  - Science: Christian August Friedrich Peters († 1880), Albert von Kölliker († 1905)
  - Art: Ludwig Passini († 1903)
- 1880
  - Science: Georg Curtius († 1885), Wilhelm von Planck († 1900)
  - Art: Arnold Böcklin († 1901), Heinrich von Ferstel († 1883)
- 1881
  - Science: Eduard Zeller († 1908)
  - Art: Eduard von Bauernfeld († 1890), Heinrich Laube († 1884), Julius Raschdorff († 1914)
- 1882
  - Science: Wilhelm von Gümbel († 1898), Heinrich von Brunn († 1894), Konrad Bursian († 1883)
  - Art: Theodor Storm († 1888)
- 1883
  - Science: Karl von Prantl († 1888), Karl von Voit († 1908)
  - Art: Friedrich von Schmidt († 1891), Edward von Steinle († 1886)
- 1884
  - Science: Max Duncker († 1886), Ernst Curtius († 1896)
  - Art: Adolph von Wilbrandt († 1911), Franz Liszt († 1886), Alfred von Meißner († 1885)
- 1885
  - Science: Franz von Miklosich († 1891), Karl Weierstraß († 1897), Carl Gegenbaur († 1903), Rudolf Clausius († 1888)
  - Art: Eduard von Gebhardt († 1925), Friedrich Spielhagen († 1911)
- 1887
  - Science: Alfred von Arneth († 1897), Julius Ficker († 1902)
  - Art: Caspar von Zumbusch († 1915), Adolf von Hildebrand († 1921), Friedrich August von Kaulbach († 1920), Anton von Werner († 1915)
- 1888
  - Science: Julius von Sachs († 1897), Albrecht Weber († 1901), August Friedrich Kekulé († 1896)
  - Art: Conrad Ferdinand Meyer († 1898), Joseph Rheinberger († 1901)
- 1889
  - Art: Wilhelm von Diez († 1907)
- 1891
  - Science: Adolf von Baeyer († 1917)
  - Art: Herman Grimm († 1901)
- 1892
  - Science: Carl Adolph Cornelius († 1903), Arthur von Auwers († 1915), Rudolf Leuckart († 1898), Fridolin von Sandberger († 1898)
  - Art: Ferdinand von Miller († 1929), Max Bruch († 1920), Wilhelm von Hertz († 1902), Rudolf von Seitz († 1910)
- 1893
  - Science: Nathanael Pringsheim († 1894)
  - Art: Friedrich von Thiersch († 1921), Georg von Hauberrisser († 1922), Ludwig von Löfftz († 1910)
- 1894
  - Science: Wilhelm von Christ († 1906), Karl von Zittel († 1904), August Weismann († 1914)
- 1895
  - Science: Wilhelm Pfeffer († 1920)
  - Art: Hubert von Herkomer († 1914), Adolf Oberländer († 1923), Gabriel von Max († 1915)
- 1896
  - Science: Friedrich Kohlrausch († 1910), Heinrich Brunner († 1915), Wilhelm Wattenbach († 1897)
  - Art: Wilhelm von Rümann († 1906)
- 1897
  - Science: Otto Ribbeck († 1898), Gustav Wiedemann († 1899), Simon Schwendener († 1919)
  - Art: Joseph Joachim († 1907)
- 1898
  - Science: Ernst Kuhn († 1920), Emil Fischer († 1919), Felix Klein († 1925), Karl Wilhelm von Kupffer († 1902), Karl Weinhold († 1901)
  - Art: Joseph Brandt († 1915)
- 1899
  - Science: Ludwig Boltzmann († 1906), Ferdinand von Richthofen († 1905)
  - Art: Wilhelm Raabe († 1910), Gabriel von Seidl († 1913)
- 1900
  - Science: August von Bechmann († 1907), Karl Theodor von Heigel († 1915), Hugo von Seeliger († 1924)
- 1901
  - Science: Eduard von Wölfflin († 1908), Wilhelm Conrad Röntgen († 1923), Jakobus Hendrikus van ’t Hoff († 1911)
  - Art: Karl von Perfall († 1907), Hans von Hopfen († 1904)
- 1902
  - Science: Karl von Amira († 1930), Theodor von Sickel († 1908), Wilhelm Hittorf († 1914)
  - Art: Hans Thoma († 1924), Franz von Stuck († 1928), Fritz von Uhde († 1911)
- 1903
  - Science: Sigmund von Riezler († 1900), Theodor Nöldeke († 1930), Ernst Abbe († 1905), Karl Neumann († 1925)
- 1904
  - Science: Ferdinand Zirkel († 1912), Hermann Usener († 1905)
  - Art: Carl Hocheder († 1917), Friedrich von Miller († 1921), Heinrich von Zügel († 1941)
- 1905
  - Science: Ernst Mach († 1916), Ferdinand von Lindemann († 1939), Ulrich von Wilamowitz-Moellendorff († 1931)
- 1906
  - Science: Adolf Furtwängler († 1907), Karl Krumbacher († 1909), Paul von Groth († 1927), Hermann Carl Vogel († 1907)
  - Art: Albert von Keller († 1920), Alfred Messel († 1909), Wilhelm Jensen († 1911)
- 1907
  - Science: Hermann Paul († 1921), David Hilbert († 1943), Carl von Linde († 1934)
  - Art: Max Zenger († 1911), Hans Grässel († 1939), Louis Tuaillon († 1919)
- 1908
  - Science: Gustav Schmoller († 1917), Vatroslav Jagić († 1923), Wilhelm Wundt († 1920), Carl Justi († 1912)
  - Art: Ludwig von Herterich († 1932)
- 1909
  - Science: Adolf von Harnack († 1930), Robert Koch († 1910)
  - Art: Hugo von Habermann († 1929), Ludwig Hoffmann († 1932)
- 1910
  - Science: Otto Crusius († 1918), Richard von Hertwig († 1937)
  - Art: Leo Samberger († 1949), Max Klinger († 1920), Richard Strauss († 1949)
- 1911
  - Science: Aurel Voss († 1931), Karl von Goebel († 1932), Ewald Hering († 1918)
  - Art: Gustav Schönleber († 1917), Fritz Boehle († 1916), Emanuel von Seidl († 1919), Angelo Jank († 1940), Gerhart Hauptmann († 1946)
- 1912
  - Science: Paul Ehrlich († 1915), Emil Warburg († 1931), Richard Schröder († 1917)
  - Art: Adolph Hengeler († 1927), Joseph Wenglein († 1919), Anton von Stadler († 1917)
- 1913
  - Science: Friedrich Kluge († 1926), Karl Binding († 1920), Theodor Boveri († 1915), Otto Bütschli († 1920)
  - Art: Gotthardt Kühl († 1915), Hermann Hahn († 1942)
- 1925
  - Science: Eduard Schwartz († 1940), Max Planck († 1947), Richard Willstätter († 1942), Wilhelm Wien († 1928)
  - Art: Max Liebermann († 1935), Max Slevogt († 1932), Theodor Fischer († 1938), German Bestelmeyer († 1942)
- 1926
  - Art: Hans Pfitzner († 1949)
- 1927
  - Science: Georg Dehio († 1932), Adolf Erman († 1937), Edward Schröder († 1942), Oswald Redlich († 1944)
  - Art: Julius Diez († 1957), Leopold von Kalckreuth († 1928)
- 1928
  - Science: Lujo Brentano († 1931), Erich von Drygalski († 1949)
  - Art: Bernhard Bleeker († 1968), Fritz Erler († 1940)
- 1929
  - Art: Hugo Lederer († 1940)
- 1930
  - Science: Max Rubner († 1932), Paul Wolters († 1936)
  - Art: Paul Ernst († 1933), Joseph Wackerle († 1959)
- 1931
  - Science: Kurt Sethe († 1934), Jakob Wackernagel († 1938), Walther von Dyck († 1934), Arnold Sommerfeld († 1951), Max Lenz († 1932)
- 1932
  - Science: Carl Correns († 1933), Theodor Wiegand († 1936), Aloys Schulte († 1941)
  - Art: Oswald Bieber († 1955), Max Feldbauer († 1948)

=== Since 1980 ===
- 1981
  - Science: Klaus Betke († 2011), Adolf Butenandt († 1995), Ernst Otto Fischer († 2007), Karl Ritter von Frisch († 1982), Walter Künneth († 1997), Heinz Maier-Leibnitz († 2000), Golo Mann († 1994), Theodor Maunz († 1993), Max Spindler († 1986)
  - Art: Axel von Ambesser († 1988), August Arnold († 1983), Werner Egk († 1983), Josef Henselmann († 1987), Eugen Jochum († 1987), Carl Orff († 1982), Heinz Rühmann († 1994), Hans Sedlmayr († 1984), Toni Stadler († 1982), Astrid Varnay († 2006)
- 1984
  - Science: Hansjochem Otto Autrum († 2003), Bernhard Bischoff († 1991), Ludwig Bölkow († 2003), Karl Bosl († 1993), Ludwig Demling († 1995), Ulrich Grigull († 2003), Hermann Heimpel († 1988), Rolf Huisgen († 2020), Bernhard Ilschner († 2006), Konrad Lorenz († 1989), Reimar Lüst († 2020), Rudolf Mößbauer († 2011), Oswald von Nell-Breuning († 1991), Lothar Rohde († 1985), Michael Schmaus († 1993), Günter Schmölders († 1991), Julius Speer († 1984), Konrad Zuse († 1995)
  - Art: Elisabeth Bergner († 1986), Kurt Böhme († 1989), Georg Brenninger († 1988), Bernhard Degenhart († 1999), Dietrich Fischer-Dieskau († 2012), Rudolf Hartmann († 1988), Hans Hartung († 1989), Ludwig Hoelscher († 1996), Hans Egon Holthusen († 1997), Hans Hotter († 2003), Wilhelm Kempff († 1991), Wolfgang Sawallisch († 2013), Wolfgang Wagner († 2010), Maria Wimmer († 1996), Mac Zimmermann († 1995)
- 1986
  - Science: Gustav Aufhammer († 1988), Friedrich Ludwig Bauer († 2015), Walter Bruch († 1990), Herbert Franke († 2011), Georges Köhler († 1995), Kurt Magnus († 2003), Hans Raupach († 1997), Audomar Scheuermann († 2000), Eugen Ulmer († 1988)
  - Art: Marianne Hoppe († 2002), Ernst Jünger († 1998), Theodor Müller († 1996), Rudolf Noelte († 2002), Josef Oberberger († 1994), Hermann Prey († 1998), Sir Georg Solti († 1997), Hans Wimmer († 1992)
- 1988
  - Science: Hans-Georg Beck († 1999), Otto Braun-Falco († 2018), Wolfgang Clemen († 1990), Klaus von Klitzing, Peter Lerche († 2016)
  - Art: Erich Steingräber († 2013)
- 1991
  - Science: Otto L. Lange († 2017), Otto Meitinger († 2017), Heinrich Nöth († 2015), Hans Georg Zachau († 2017)
  - Art: Günter Bialas († 1995), Alexander von Branca († 2011), Harald Genzmer († 2007), Werner Haftmann († 1999), Ernst Maria Lang († 2014)
- 1993
  - Science: Heinrich Fries († 1998), Wolfgang Haber, Robert Huber, Hans Maier, Anton Spitaler († 2003)
  - Art: Sergiu Celibidache († 1996), Heinz Friedrich († 2004), Rupprecht Geiger († 2009), Wilhelm Killmayer († 2017), Fritz Koenig († 2017), Hermann Lenz († 1998), Konstanze Vernon († 2013)
- 1995
  - Science: Wolfgang Kaiser, Wolfhart Pannenberg († 2014), Joseph Kardinal Ratzinger († 2022), Willibald Sauerländer († 2018), Otto Speck, Hans F. Zacher († 2015)
  - Art: Martin Benrath († 2000), Vicco von Bülow († 2011), Brigitte Fassbaender, Hertha Töpper († 2020), Martin Walser († 2023)
- 1998
  - Science: Heinz Bauer († 2002), Gerd Binnig, Roland Bulirsch († 2022), Horst Fuhrmann († 2011), Eveline Gottzein, Martin Lindauer († 2008)
  - Art: Rolf Boysen († 2014), Lothar-Günther Buchheim († 2007), Tankred Dorst († 2017), August Everding († 1999), Hans Werner Henze († 2012), Carlos Kleiber († 2004), Julia Varady
- 1999
  - Science: Knut Borchardt, Wolfgang Frühwald († 2019), Regine Kahmann, Arnulf Schlüter († 2011), Harald Weinrich († 2022), Ernst-Ludwig Winnacker, Meinhart Zenk († 2011)
  - Art: Sir Colin Davis († 2013), Edita Gruberová († 2021), Thomas Holtzmann († 2013), Friedhelm Kemp († 2011), Elfriede Kuzmany († 2006), Martha Mödl († 2001), Doris Schade († 2012), Wieland Schmied († 2014), Gisela Stein († 2009)
- 2001
  - Science: Adolf Birkhofer († 2019), Hans Blömer († 2020), Eva-Bettina Bröcker, Franz Mayinger († 2021), Klaus Pinkau († 2021), Hubert Ziegler († 2009)
  - Art: Dieter Dorn, Reiner Kunze, Waltraud Meier, Anne-Sophie Mutter, Robert Spaemann († 2018), Ruth Zechlin († 2007)
- 2003
  - Science: Eugen Biser († 2014), Theodor Hänsch, Berthold Hölldobler, Elke Lütjen-Drecoll, Trutz Rendtorff († 2016), Albrecht Struppler († 2009)
  - Art: Hans-Busso von Busse († 2009), Ruth Drexel († 2009), Aribert Reimann († 2024), Horst Stein († 2008)
- 2006
  - Science: Heinz Billing († 2017), Claus-Wilhelm Canaris († 2021), Dieter Henrich († 2022), Volker ter Meulen, Maria-Elisabeth Michel-Beyerle, Dieter Seitzer
  - Art: Cornelia Froboess, Kurt Moll († 2017), Jürgen Rose
- 2008
  - Science: Laetitia Boehm († 2018), Walter Neupert († 2019), Hans-Werner Sinn, Paul Zanker
  - Art: Reinhold Baumstark, Sir Peter Jonas († 2020), Zubin Mehta
- 2010
  - Science: Gisela Anton, Harald zur Hausen, Joachim Milberg, Reinhard Rummel, Hubert Schmidbaur, Markus Schwaiger, Anna-Elisabeth Trappe
  - Art: Diana Damrau, Wilfried Hiller, Mariss Jansons († 2019), Otfried Preußler († 2013), Klaus Schultz († 2014)
- 2012
  - Science: Manfred Broy, Heinz Gerhäuser, Peter Gruss, Jörg Hacker, Wolfgang A. Herrmann, Doris Schmitt-Landsiedel
  - Art: Siegfried Jerusalem, Ivan Liška, Siegfried Mauser, Herta Müller
- 2014
  - Science: August Böck, Gerhard Ertl, Gerhard Hirzinger, Paul Kirchhof, Christian Meier, Christiane Nüsslein-Volhard
  - Art: Anita Albus, Sibylle Canonica, Jens Malte Fischer, Christian Gerhaher, Gerhard Oppitz, Wolfgang Rihm
- 2016
  - Science: Lorraine Daston, Dieter Oesterhelt († 2022)
  - Art: Peter Gülke, Brigitte Kronauer († 2019), Edgar Reitz
- 2018
  - Science: Ingrid Kögel-Knabner, Laurens Molenkamp, Petra Schwille, Gerhard Leuchs, Barbara Stollberg-Rilinger
  - Art: Jonas Kaufmann, Norbert Miller, Jörg Widmann, Michael Haneke
- 2021
  - Science: Reinhard Genzel, Immanuel Bloch, Bärbel Friedrich, Franz-Ulrich Hartl, Heike Paul, Martin Stratmann, Rüdiger Wehner, Andreas Wirsching
  - Art: Doris Dörrie, Julia Fischer, Ulrich Konrad
- 2023
  - Henry Kissinger († 2023)
  - Science: Patrick Cramer, Clemens Fuest, Erika von Mutius, Jürgen Osterhammel
  - Art: Klaus Doldinger († 2025), Thomas Gottschalk, Michael Krüger, Isabel Mundry, Katharina Wagner
- 2024
  - Science: Ferenc Krausz, Harald Lesch
- 2025
  - Science: Georg Ertl, Bernd Huber, Maria-Elena Torres-Padilla, Jörg Vogel, Ulrich Walter
  - Art: Martina Gedeck, Herlinde Koelbl, Rachel Salamander, Ralph Siegel
- 2026
  - Art: Sir Simon Rattle

== Rejection or withdrawn ==
- 1853: Ludwig Uhland (rejection)
- 1887: Paul Heyse (withdrawn)
- 2022: Siegfried Mauser (return)
