= Wölfflin =

Wölflin, Wölfflin is a surname that may refer to:

- Heinrich Wölfflin (1864–1945), Swiss art historian
- Johannes Wölflin (Czech: Jan Welflin, Velflín; 1345–1393), real name of John of Nepomuk
- Wölflin (Czech: Velflín, Volflín; died 1367) father of John of Nepomuk
- Eduard Wölfflin (1831–1908), Swiss philologist (de)
- Kurt Wölfflin (1934–1998), Austrian author (de)
