= Expositio totius mundi et gentium =

Expositio totius mundi et gentium ("A description of the world and its people") is a brief "commercial-geographical" survey written by an anonymous citizen of the Roman Empire living during the reign of Constantius II. The Greek original, composed between AD 350 and 362, is now lost. The text comes to us through two Latin translations made during the sixth century.

The work is composed of three parts. The first (§ 1-21) describes lands east of the Roman Empire and contains the most legendary and least accurate geographical information. The second part (§ 22–62), the longest, describes the mainland provinces of the Empire, while the third (§ 63–68) describes island provinces.

== The anonymous author ==
Little is known about the anonymous author of the work, though clues from the text are often used to garner information. While "it has been suggested that he was a rhetor, sophist, merchant, entrepreneur [sic] or a vir rusticus", the work's preoccupation with trade and port cities is notable. He mentions 61 cities, only 16 of which are in the western portion of the Empire. It is usually assumed he was a native of Syria.

The author's religion is likewise a mystery. While he mentions numerous Greek writers (Berossus, Manetho, a mysterious Apollonius, Menander of Ephesus, Herodotus and Thucydides), he shows little sign of any real influence by them, or indeed of any meaningful education, possibly only being aware of them through his familiarity with Against Apion by Josephus, whom he refers to as the "teacher of the Jews".

On the one hand, Josephus is more likely to have been known to a Christian. The text also contains "Biblical allusions" and "Christian phrases". However, the text shows no interest in the churches or holy sites documented by the later Christian itineraria, and is more likely to note a city's "gripping games, good wines and pretty women", while displaying an "obvious affinity" for pagan cults and rituals.

== Latin translations ==
One of the surviving translations, from which the more well known title of Expositio Totius Mundi & Gentium is derived, is now also lost but was preserved by Jacques Godefroy's 1628 printing of his book "Vetus Orbis Descriptio". Godefroy's work contains three versions of "Expositio". It has a Greek version and two Latin ones: "nova versio" and "vetus versio".

The other, from a manuscript held in a Benedictine monastery in Cava, near Naples, was published in 1831 by Angelo Mai and bears the title Descriptio totius mundi. The Descriptio, while more abridged than the Expositio, is nonetheless the only manuscript to contain the beginning of the work.

"Descriptio totius mundi" and the "vetus versio" of "Expositio Totius Mundi & Gentium" were printed in the second volumen of Karl Otfried Müller's Minor Greek Geographers (1861). In these series of books, his name is printed as Carolus Mullerus and the title in the original language is "Geographi Graeci Minores".

== English translation ==
An English translation, now available online, was made by Jesse Woodman as part of a Master's thesis at Ohio State University in 1964. A widely available printed English translation has never been published.

== See also ==
- List of Graeco-Roman geographers
- History of geography

== Bibliography ==
=== English ===
- Grüll, T. 2014. Expositio totius mundi et gentium. A peculiar work on the commerce of [the] Roman Empire from the mid-fourth century - compiled by a Syrian textile dealer? in Csabai, Z. Studies in Economic and Sociale History of the Ancient Near East in Memory of Péter Vargyas. Department of Ancient History, University of Pécs & L'Harmattan, Budapest.
- Woodman, J. E., 1964. The Expositio totius mundi et gentium: Its Geography and Its Language. MA Thesis, The Ohio State University.

=== Non-English ===
- Drexhage, H.-J. 1983. Die ’Expositio totius mundi et gentium’ eine Handelsgeographie aus dem 4. Jh. n. Chr., eigeleitet, übersetz und mit einführender Literatur (Kap. XXII-LXVII) versehen. MBAH 2:3-42.
- Klotz, Alfred. 1906. Über die Expositio totius mundi et gentium. Philologus 65:97-127.
- Marasco, G. 1996. L’Expositio totius mundi et gentium - e la politica religiosa di Constanzo II. in Ancient Society 27:183-203.
- Martelli, F. 1982. Introduzione alla "Expositio totius mundi". Analisi etnografica e tematiche politiche in un’opera anonima del IV secolo. Bologna.
- Mittag, P. F. 2006. Zu den Quellen der Expositio Totius Mundi et Gentium. Ein neuer Periplus? Hermes 134:338-351.
- Müller, Karl. 1861. Geographi Graeci minores. Volumen Secundum. Paris.
- Expositio totius mundi et gentium, introduction, texte critique, traduction française, notes et commentaire par Jean Rougé, coll. Sources chrétiennes, Textes orientaux n° 124, Éditions du Cerf, 1966.
- Sinko, T. 1904. Die descriptio orbis terrae, eine Handelsgeographie aus dem 4. Jahrhundert. Archiv für lateinische Lexikographie und Grammatik 13:531-571.
- Traiana, G., 1998. La prefazione alla "Descriptio [Expositio] totius mundi". Pp. 53–51 in C. Santini – N. Scivoletto – L. Zurli eds.) Prefazioni, prologhi, proemi di opere tecnico-scientifiche latine, Roma.
- Wölfflin, Eduard. 1904. Bemerkungen zu der Descriptio orbis. Archiv für lateinische Lexikographie und Grammatik 13:574-578.
