= Sigmund Freud Prize =

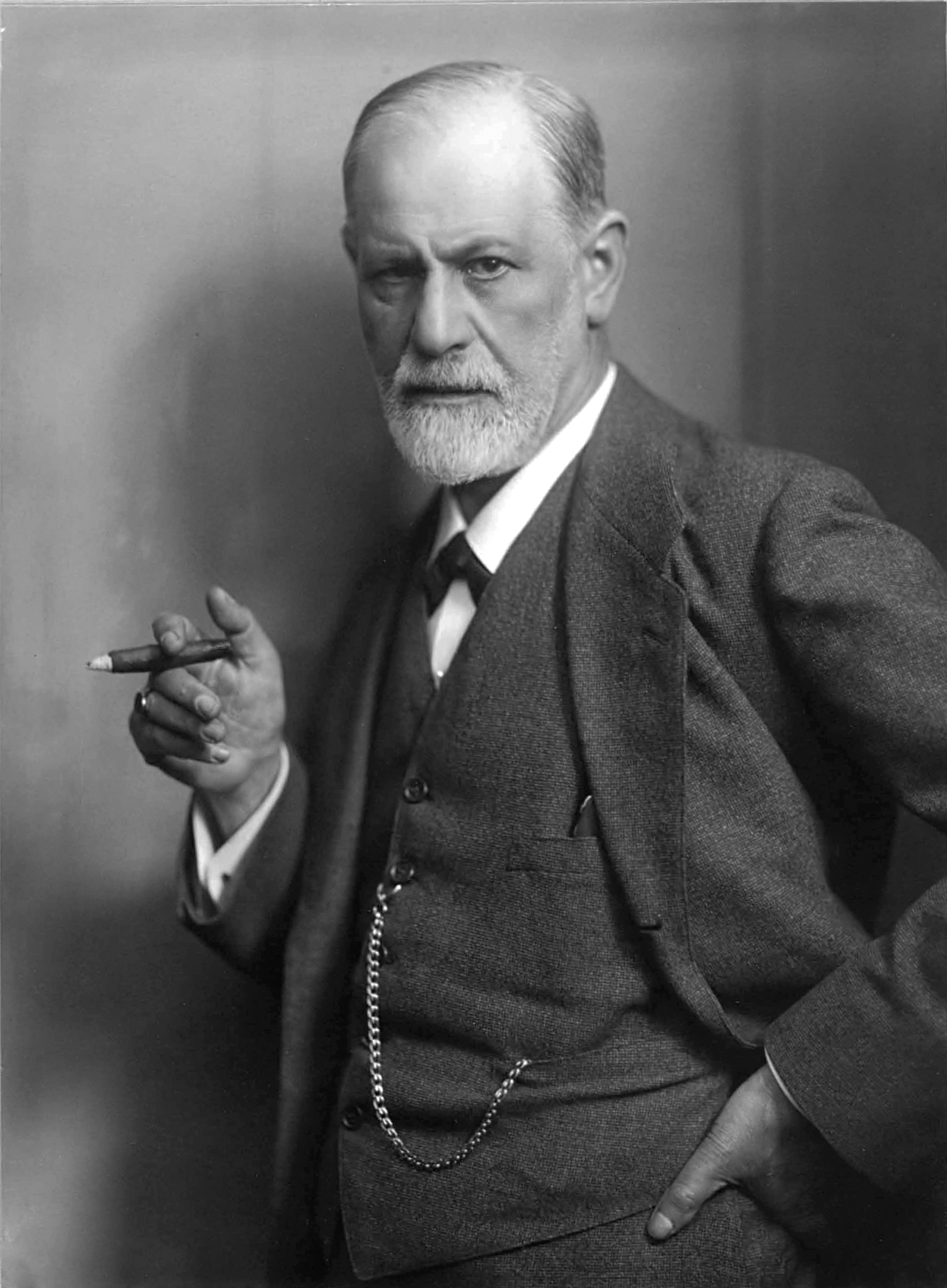
- Location: Darmstadt
- Country: Germany
- Presented by: Deutsche Akademie für Sprache und Dichtung
- Reward: €20,000
- First award: 1964
- Website: www.deutscheakademie.de/en/awards/sigmund-freud-preis

The Sigmund Freud Prize or Sigmund Freud Prize for Academic Prose (German: Sigmund Freud-Preis für wissenschaftliche Prosa) is a German literary award named after Sigmund Freud and awarded by the Deutsche Akademie für Sprache und Dichtung (German Academy for Language and Literature). It was first awarded in 1964.

== The Sigmund Freud Prize and philosophy ==
In 1967, the Sigmund Freud Prize was awarded for the first time to a philosopher, Hannah Arendt. As of 2006, ten of its recipients were philosophers writing in the German language, among them Hannah Arendt (1967), Ernst Bloch (1975), Jürgen Habermas (1976), Hans-Georg Gadamer (1979), Hans Blumenberg (1980), Odo Marquard (1984), Günther Anders (1992), Kurt Flasch (2000), Klaus Heinrich (2002), and Peter Sloterdijk (2005).

The Sigmund Freud Prize is amongst the most prestigious academic prizes in Germany.

== Winners ==
- 1964 Hugo Friedrich, classicist
- 1965 Adolf Portmann, zoologist
- 1966 Emil Staiger, scholar of German language and literature
- 1967 Hannah Arendt, philosopher
- 1968 Karl Barth, Theologian
- 1969 Bruno Snell, linguist (ancient languages)
- 1970 Werner Heisenberg, physicist
- 1971 Werner Kraft, literary historian
- 1972 Erik Wolf, jurist (lawyer)
- 1973 Karl Rahner, theologian
- 1974 Günter Busch, art historian
- 1975 Ernst Bloch, philosopher
- 1976 Jürgen Habermas, philosopher
- 1977 Harald Weinrich, classicist
- 1978 Siegfried Melchinger, theatrical historian
- 1979 Hans-Georg Gadamer, philosopher
- 1980 Hans Blumenberg, philosopher
- 1981 Kurt von Fritz, linguist (ancient languages)
- 1982 Arno Borst, historian
- 1983 Peter Graf Kielmansegg, political scientist
- 1984 Odo Marquard, philosopher
- 1985 Hermann Heimpel, historian
- 1986 Hartmut von Hentig, education studies
- 1987 Gerhard Ebeling, theologian
- 1988 Carl Friedrich von Weizsäcker, physicist and philosopher
- 1989 Ralf Dahrendorf, political scientist
- 1990 Walther Killy, literary scholar
- 1991 Werner Hofmann, art historian
- 1992 Günther Anders, philosopher
- 1993 Norbert Miller, literary scholar
- 1994 Peter Gülke, musicologist
- 1995 Gustav Seibt, historian
- 1996 Peter Wapnewski, scholar of German language and literature
- 1997 Paul Parin, ethno-psychologist
- 1998 Ilse Grubrich-Simitis, psychologist
- 1999 Reinhart Koselleck, historian
- 2000 Kurt Flasch, philosopher
- 2001 Horst Bredekamp, art historian
- 2002 Klaus Heinrich, philosopher
- 2003 Walter Burkert, classicist
- 2004 Karl Schlögel, historian
- 2005 Peter Sloterdijk, philosopher
- 2006 Johannes Fried, historian
- 2007 Josef H. Reichholf, evolutionary biologist
- 2008 Michael Hagner, physician and historian of science
- 2009 Julia Voss, art historian and journalist
- 2010 Luca Giuliani, archeologist
- 2011 Arnold Esch, historian
- 2012 Ernst-Wolfgang Böckenförde, lawyer
- 2013 Angelika Neuwirth, Arabist
- 2014 Jürgen Osterhammel, historian
- 2015 Peter Eisenberg, linguist
- 2016 Jan Assmann, Egyptologist
- 2017 Barbara Stollberg-Rilinger, historian
- 2018 Wolfgang Kemp, art historian
- 2019 Thomas Macho, philosopher
- 2020 Ute Frevert, historian
- 2021 Hubert Wolf, church historian
- 2022 Iris Därmann, philosopher
- 2023 Matthias Glaubrecht, science journalist
- 2024 Karl-Heinz Kohl, ethnologist and religious scholar
- 2025 Dan Diner, historian and political writer
- 2026 Anke te Heesen, historian of science
