= Alfred Klotz =

German classical scholar (1874–1956)

- Born: 15 June 1874; Zittau, Kingdom of Saxony, German Empire
- Died: 10 January 1956 (aged 81); Erlangen, Bavaria, West Germany

Academic background
- Education: Leipzig University
- Thesis: Curae Statianae (1896)
- Influences: Otto Ribbeck; Otto Immisch; Richard August Reitzenstein

Academic work
- Discipline: Classics
- Sub-discipline: Latin literature
- Institutions: German University in Prague; University of Erlangen

Alfred Klotz (15 June 1874 – 10 January 1956) was a German classicist and scholar of Latin literature. Born into a family of classical scholars, he studied classical philology at the University of Leipzig and worked at the German University in Prague from 1911 until the outbreak of the First World War. After the war, he was appointed to the chair of Latin at the University of Erlangen.

The central achievement of his career were a number of critical editions of classical authors: he published editions of the poems of Statius, the commentarii of Julius Caesar, and a large part of Cicero's speeches. His editions of Statius, in particular, were long used as the standard texts. Klotz also worked on source criticism. His contributions to this topic are described by classicist Klaus Stiewe as his most lasting scholarly legacy.

== Life and career ==
Alfred Klotz was born in Zittau in the Kingdom of Saxony on 15 June 1874. His father and grandfather had worked as classical scholars in Leipzig. In 1892, he followed the same career path by enrolling to study Classics at Leipzig University, where he was particularly influenced by Latinist Otto Ribbeck and Hellenist Otto Immisch. Having written a doctoral dissertation on the Silvae by the Roman poet Statius, he graduated with a PhD in 1896.

In 1905, after spending some time as a lexicographer at the Thesaurus Linguae Latinae at Munich, Klotz became a lecturer (Privatdozent) at the University of Strasbourg and cultivated a friendship with the historian of religion Richard August Reitzenstein. From 1911, he assumed a full professorship at the German University in Prague. His tenure was interrupted by the First World War: rising to the rank of Hauptmann (captain), he participated in the Battle of the Somme and suffered an eye injury. In 1920, he was appointed to the chair of Latin at the University of Erlangen, where he remained until his retirement in 1939. He died on 10 January 1956.

== Works ==
The central achievement of his career were a number of critical editions of classical authors: he published editions of the poems of Statius, the commentarii of Julius Caesar, and a large part of Cicero's speeches. His editions of Statius, in particular, were long used as the standard texts. An expert in source criticism, he showed an interest in the Greek precedents of Roman authors, resulting in publications on the historical writers Appian, Livy and Valerius Maximus. According to a biography of Klotz by classicist Klaus Stiewe, his contributions to source criticism were his most lastings scholarly legacy since many of his findings remained unrivalled until the late 20th-century.

In 1934, in the context of the race theory promoted by the government of Adolf Hitler, Klotz co-authored a textbook on the putative Nordic master race. Wilhelm Ament, director of the C.C. Buchner Verlag, had commissioned the book in order to supplement the existing literature in accordance with the government's ideological views. Klotz's publication did not fulfil the official requirements and, after revision, became a commercial disappointment.

== Bibliography ==
- Seel, Otto (1956). "Alfred Klotz". Gnomon. 28: 398–400. ISSN 0017-1417. JSTOR i27681364.
- Blänsdorf, Agnes (2004). "Lehrwerke für Geschichtsunterricht an den Höheren Schulen 1933–1945: Autoren und Verlage under den Bedingungen des Nationalsozialismus". In Lehmann, Hartmut; Oexle, Otto Gerhard (eds.). Nationalsozialismus in den Kulturwissenschaften: Fächer, Milieus, Karrieren (in German). Göttingen: Vandenhoeck & Ruprecht. pp. 273–370. ISBN 3525351984.
