= Bence Nanay =

Belgian philosopher and film critic (born 1974)

Bence Nanay (born 1974) is a Belgian philosopher and film critic. He is co-director of the Centre for Philosophical Psychology at the University of Antwerp and Senior Research Associate at Peterhouse, Cambridge University.

== Work ==
Bence Nanay is Professor of Philosophy and BOF Research Professor at the University of Antwerp. (Note: BOF refers to the Dutch Bijzonder Onderzoeksfonds, i.e. internal funding from within the university.) He has been Visiting Professor at a number of universities in France, Italy, Germany and Switzerland (Università della Svizzera Italiana). He is co-director of the centre for Philosophical Psychology at Antwerp. His research focuses on philosophy of mind, philosophy of biology and aesthetics. His work is widely discussed in journals like Journal of Philosophy, Philosophical Studies, Analysis, Pacific Philosophical Quarterly, Mind & Language, Journal of Mind and Behavior, Studies in the History and Philosophy of Science, Phenomenology and the Cognitive Sciences and Philosophical Psychology.

Nanay is the primary investigator of the Between Perception and Action project at the University of Antwerp, supported by a million euro grant from Fonds Wetenschappelijk Onderzoek (FWO) (English: Flemish Research Foundation).

He is also the primary investigator of the Seeing Things You Don't See project, supported by a 2-million euro Consolidator Grant from the European Research Council

He is the editor of The Monist's special issue on the philosophy of Robert Musil and the editor on the centenary special issue on Heinrich Wölfflin in Journal of Aesthetics and Art Criticism.

Nanay is also known for his work as a film critic. He has served as a jury member at a number of major film festivals, including the Chicago International Film Festival, the San Francisco Film Festival, the Miami International Film Festival and the Mar del Plata International Film Festival (Argentina).

== Bibliography ==
- Bence Nanay. (editor) Perceiving the World (Oxford University Press, 2010).
- Bence Nanay. Between Perception and Action (Oxford University Press, 2013).
- Bence Nanay. Aesthetics as Philosophy of Perception (Oxford University Press, 2016).
- Bence Nanay. Aesthetics: A Very Short Introduction (Oxford University Press, 2019).
- Bence Nanay. Aesthetic Life and Why It Matters, co-written with Dominic McIvor Lopes and Nick Riggle, (Oxford University Press, 2021).
- Bence Nanay. Mental Imagery: Philosophy, Psychology, Neuroscience (Oxford University Press, 2023).
