= Karl August von Heigel =

German writer (1835–1905)

- Born: 25 March 1835; Munich, Germany
- Died: 6 September 1905 (aged 70); Riva del Garda, Italy
- Occupation: Novelist
- Relatives: Karl Theodor von Heigel (brother)

Karl August von Heigel (25 March 1835 in Munich – 6 September 1905), a German novelist, was the son of a régisseur or stage-manager of the court theatre in Munich.

In that city he received his early schooling and studied (1854–1858) philosophy at the Ludwig-Maximilians-Universität München (LMU). He was then appointed librarian to Prince Heinrich zu Carolath-Beuthen in Lower Silesia, and accompanied the nephew of the prince on travels.

In 1863 be settled in Berlin, where from 1865 to 1875 he was engaged in journalism. He next resided at Munich, employed in literary work for the king, Ludwig II, who in 1881 conferred upon him a title of nobility. On the death of the king in 1886 he removed to Riva on the Lago di Garda, where he died on 6 September 1905.

Karl von Heigel attained some popularity with his novels:

- Wohin? (1873)
- Die Dame ohne Herz (1873)
- Das Geheimnis des Königs (1891)
- Der Roman einer Stadt (1898)
- Der Maharadschah (1900)
- Die nervöse Frau (1900)
- Die neuen Heiligen (1901)

He also wrote some plays, notably Josephine Bonaparte (1892) and Die Zarin (1883); and several collections of short stories, Neue Erzählungen (1876), Neueste Novellen (1878), and Heitere Erzählungen (1893).
