= Werner Kraft =

German-Israeli literary scholar, writer and librarian

Werner Kraft (4 May 1896, Braunschweig - 14 June 1991, Jerusalem) was a German-Israeli literary scholar, writer and librarian.

== Life ==
Kraft was born in Braunschweig in 1896 to Jewish parents. He spent most of his childhood in Hanover. In 1910 Kraft, already interested in German literature and bibliophile, discovered the work of two contemporary writers; Rudolf Borchardt and Karl Kraus. In addition to Borchardt and Kraus, Kraft was an admirer of Stefan George, Goethe, Hofmannsthal and Kafka. From 1906 to 1914 he attended the Leibniz School in the Alte Celler Heerstraße.

=== Lessing ===
In 1913 he made the acquaintance of Theodor Lessing in the bookstore Ludwig Ey at the Hanoverian Steintor, who gave Kraft decisive impetus and with whom he was to remain connected until Lessing's death in 1933. Lessing also mediated Kraft's first publication in the journal Die Aktion, edited by Franz Pfemfert, a review of Rudolf Borchardt's poem Wannsee and Stefan George's poetry book Der Stern des Bundes. For half a year he tried his hand at an apprenticeship as a banker at Dresdner Bank in Hanover, whose director Julius L. Isenstein (1856–1929) was a relative on his mother's side.

=== Berlin ===
In 1915 he began studying German and French philology and philosophy in Berlin with his cousin, the poet Paul Kraft (1896–1922). In Berlin he also made friends with Walter Benjamin and Gerhard (Gershom) Scholem and first met the writer Borchardt, whom he admired. In 1916 he became a soldier, although he was spared the so-called 'steel bath' at the front. From 1916 to 1919 he served as a medical soldier in Hanover, most of the time in the Wahrendorff institutes, in the so-called hospital for war hysterics and war neurotics (now the Wahrendorff Clinic) in Ilten near Hanover, a service that brought the twenty-year-old to the verge of suicide. His friendship with Lessing and reading the magazine Die Fackel by the Viennese satirist Karl Kraus as well as the books by Borchardt. Kraus and Borchardt became his literary heroes; both are known to be men of Jewish origin and found it difficult to admit their origin.

=== Career as a librarian ===
In 1920 he trained as a librarian in order to subsidise his lifestyle and extensive writing. Between 1922 and 1926 he worked at the German Library (now the German National Library) in Leipzig. In 1928 he started his post as librarian at the Gottfried Wilhelm Leibniz Library. As a Jew, Kraft was dismissed from his position in 1933.

=== Emigration and exile ===
In 1933, he emigrated to Sweden and finally to Israel. He later wrote in his diary:

"It was only after 1933 that I finally and forever knew that I was not a German, that I was a Jew. He was now dictated by a criminal force that the Jews belong to the German people only through language. What a sign on the wall that was already smeared with blood! Just through the language that murdered violence before it murdered people! I have never given up this language, I have always considered it to be a commission to which there was no objection, to lead my life within the German spirit."

== Prizes ==
- Literature Prize of the Bavarian Academy of Fine Arts, 1966
- Sigmund Freud Prize from the German Academy for Language and Poetry in Darmstadt, 1971
- Honorary doctorate from the University of Freiburg, 1975
- Goethe Medal, 1982
- Wilhelm Heinse Medal of the Academy of Sciences and Literature Mainz, 1987
