= Heinrich Wölfflin =

Swiss art historian (1864–1945)

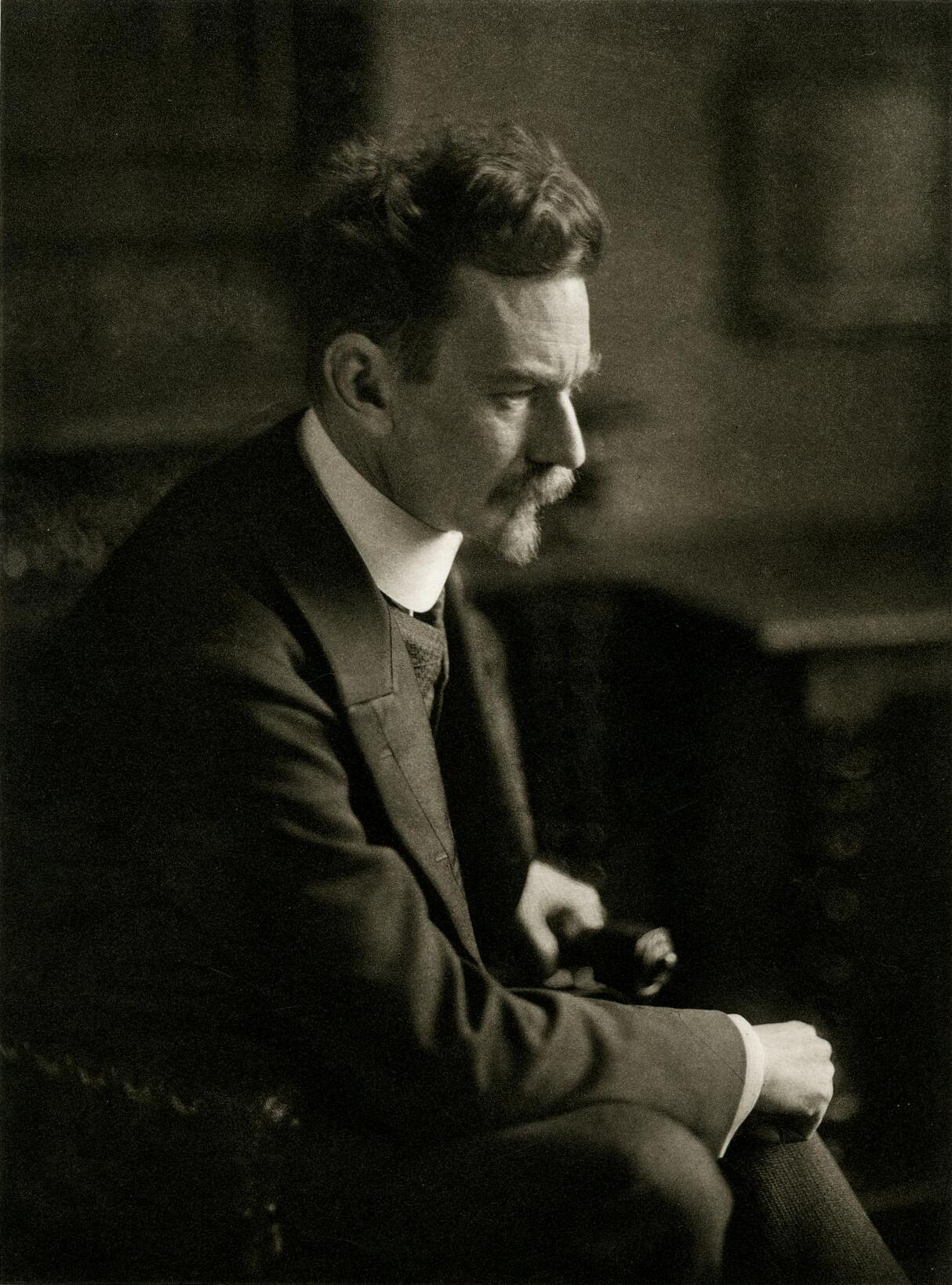
- Photograph by Rudolf Dührkoop
- Born: 21 June 1864; Winterthur, Switzerland
- Died: 19 July 1945 (aged 81); Zürich, Switzerland
- Burial place: Basel, Switzerland
- Education: Ludwig-Maximilians-Universität München
- Occupation: Art historian
- Father: Eduard Wölfflin

Heinrich Wölfflin (German: [ˈhaɪnʁɪç ˈvœlflɪn]; 21 June 1864 – 19 July 1945) was a Swiss art historian, esthetician and educator, whose objective classifying principles ("painterly" vs. "linear" and the like) were influential in the development of formal analysis in art history in the early 20th century. He taught at the University of Basel, the Friedrich Wilhelm University of Berlin and the Ludwig-Maximilians-Universität München in the generation that saw German art history's rise to pre-eminence. His three most important books, still consulted, are Renaissance und Barock (1888), Die Klassische Kunst (1898, "Classic Art"), and Kunstgeschichtliche Grundbegriffe (1915, "Principles of Art History").

Wölfflin taught at the Friedrich Wilhelm University of Berlin from 1901 to 1912, at the Ludwig-Maximilians-Universität München from 1912 to 1924, and at the University of Zurich from 1924 until his retirement.

== Origins and career ==
Wölfflin was born in Winterthur, Switzerland. His father, Eduard Wölfflin, was a professor of classical philology who taught at the Ludwig-Maximilians-Universität München and helped to found and organize the Thesaurus Linguae Latinae. The younger Wölfflin studied art history and history with Jakob Burckhardt at the University of Basel, philosophy with Wilhelm Dilthey at Berlin University, and art history and philosophy at Munich. He received his doctoral degree from the Ludwig-Maximilians-Universität München in 1886 in philosophy, although he was already on a course to study the newly minted discipline of art history.

Wölfflin's principal philosophy mentor at the Ludwig-Maximilians-Universität München, where Wölfflin earned his doctoral degree, was the renowned professor of archaeology Heinrich Brunn. Greatly influenced by his mentors, particularly neo-Kantian Johannes Volkelt (Der Symbolbegriff) and Brunn, Wölfflin's own dissertation, "Prolegomena zu einer Psychologie der Architektur" (1886), already showed the approach that he was later to develop and perfect: an analysis of form based on a psychological interpretation of the creative process. It is considered now to be one of the founding texts of the emerging discipline of art history, although it was barely noted when it was published.

After graduating in 1886, Wölfflin published the result of a years' travel and study in Italy, as his Renaissance und Barock (1888), already showed the approach that he was later to develop and perfect, he pursued his method in books on the Renaissance and Baroque periods. For Wölfflin, the 16th-century art, now described as "Mannerist", was part of the Baroque aesthetic, one that Burckhardt before him as well as most French and English-speaking scholars for a generation after him dismissed as degenerate. On the death of Jacob Burckhardt in 1897, Wöllflin succeeded him in the Art History Chair at Basel. He is credited with having introduced the teaching method of using twin parallel projectors in the delivery of art history lectures, so that images could be compared when magic lanterns became less dangerous. The influential art historians Erwin Panofsky and Ernst Gombrich recalled being inspired by him.

Notable students of Wölfflin included Frederick Antal, Paul Frankl, Carola Giedion-Welcker, Richard Krautheimer, Kurt Martin, Jakob Rosenberg, Fritz Saxl, Frida Schottmüller,, Klara Steinweg, and Bruno E. Werner.

== Principles of Art History ==
In Principles of Art History, Wölfflin formulated five pairs of opposed or contrary precepts in the form and style of art of the sixteenth and seventeenth centuries which demonstrated a shift in the nature of artistic vision between the two periods. These were:

1. From linear (draughtsmanship, plastic, relating to contour in projected ideation of objects) to painterly (malerisch: tactile, observing patches or systems of relative light and of non-local colour within shade, making shadow and light integral, and allowing them to replace or supersede the dominance of contours as fixed boundaries.)
2. From plane to recession: (from the 'Will to the plane', which orders the picture in strata parallel to the picture plane, to planes made inapparent by emphasising the forward and backward relations and engaging the spectator in recessions.)
3. From closed (tectonic) form to open (a-tectonic) form (The closed or tectonic form is the composition which is a self-contained entity which everywhere points back to itself, the typical form of ceremonial style as the revelation of law, generally within predominantly vertical and horizontal oppositions; the open or atectonic form compresses energies and angles or lines of motion which everywhere reach out beyond the composition, and override the horizontal and vertical structure, though naturally bound together by hidden rules which allow the composition to be self-contained.)
4. From multiplicity to unity: ('Classic art achieves its unity by making the parts independent as free members, and the baroque abolishes the uniform independence of the parts in favour of a more unified total motive. In the former case, co-ordination of the accents; in the latter, subordination.' The multiple details of the former are each uniquely contemplated: the multiplicity of the latter serves to diminish the dominance of line, and to enhance the unification of the multifarious whole.)
5. From absolute clarity to relative clarity of the subject: (i.e. from the exhaustive revelation of the form of the subject to a pictorial representation which deliberately evades objective clearness in order to deliver a perfect rendering of information or pictorial appearance obtained by other painterly means.

Wölfflin applied this method to Trecento, Quattrocento and Cinquecento art in Classic Art (1899), then developed it further in The Principles of Art History (1915). His definition of the baroque style, which identified Baroque art and architecture as corresponding to the formal qualities of painterliness, open form, multiplicity, and relative clarity, was a shift from previous definitions of Baroque as a period of post-Renaissance decline.

== Impact and reception ==
"Heinrich Wölfflin, perhaps the most important art historian of his generation, was so receptive to the aesthetic purism prevailing at the time that he developed a technique of dissociation that was as extreme as the Remy de Gourmont." – Edgar Wind, Art and Anarchy, Suhrkamp Taschenbuch Wissenschaft No. 1163, Frankfurt am Main, 1994, p 27

The legacy of Wölfflin's Principles upon international scholarship and the teaching of the history of art was examined as the subject of a symposium at the Center for Advanced Study in the Visual Arts in 2015. The Journal of Aesthetics and Art Criticism published a special issue commemorating the 100th anniversary of the publication of the Principles in 2015, edited by Bence Nanay.

== Works ==
- H. Wölfflin. Principles of Art History. The Problem of the Development of Style in Later Art, Translated from 7th German Edition (1929) into English by M D Hottinger (Dover Publications, New York 1932 and reprints).
- H. Wöllflin. Classic Art. An Introduction to the Italian Renaissance. Translated from the 8th German Edition (Benno Schwabe & Co, Basle 1948) by Peter and Linda Murray (Phaidon Press, London 1952, 2nd Edn 1953).
- H. Wölfflin. Die Kunst Albrecht Dürers (The Art of Albrecht Dürer), (F Bruckmann, Munich 1905, 2d Edn 1908).
- H. Wölfflin. Die Bamburger Apokalypse: Eine Reichenauer Bilderhandschrift vom Jahre 1000 (The Bamburg Apocalypse: A Reichenau illuminated manuscript from the year 1000), (Kurt Wolff, Munich 1921).
- H. Wölfflin. Italien und das deutsche Formgefühl (Italy and the German sense of Form), (1931).
- H. Wölfflin. Gedenken zur Kunstgeschichte (Thoughts on Art History), (1941).
- H. Wöllflin. Kleine Schriften (Shorter Writings), (1946).
