= Maria-Elena Torres-Padilla =

Mexican biologist

- Education: National Autonomous University of Mexico, Institut Pasteur (Ph.D.)
- Known for: totipotency, pluripotency, early embryo, epigenetics, chromatin architecture
- Scientific career
- Fields: Epigenetics; Stem Cells
- Workplaces: University of Cambridge; Institute of Genetics, Molecular and Cellular Biology (IGBMC); Helmholtz Zentrum München
- Website: Torres-Padilla Lab

Maria-Elena Torres-Padilla is a Mexican biologist who is the Director of the Stem Cell Center, the Director of the Institute for Epigenetics and Stem Cells (IES), and a Group Leader at the Helmholtz Zentrum München, Germany.

== Education ==
From 1994 until 1998, Torres-Padilla completed her undergraduate studies at the Faculty of Sciences of the National Autonomous University of Mexico in Mexico and earned her Ph.D. from the Institut Pasteur in Paris in 2002.

== Career and research ==
Between 2002 and 2006, she was a postdoctoral fellow at The Gurdon Institute, University of Cambridge, UK, after which she worked as a permanent scientist under Laszlo Tora's supervision.

Since December 2008, she has led her research group at the Institute of Genetics, Molecular and Cellular Biology (IGBMC) in Strasbourg, France. In January 2016, the lab was relocated to the Institute of Epigenetics and Stem Cells at the Helmholtz Zentrum München, Germany.

The primary objective of Torres-Padilla's research activities is to comprehend the manner in which epigenetic information controls the shifts in cellular identity and cellular reprogramming. This is crucial in comprehending pluripotent stem cell biology, particularly their development and origin. The work also endeavors to gain insight into the early stages of embryonic development, human reproduction, fertility, and stem cell biology from a broader perspective.

Torres-Padilla is an editorial board member of Science, Development, Genes & Development, and EMBO Reports

== Awards and honours ==
- 2011 ERC Starting Grant – "NuclearPotency"
- 2011 EMBO Young Investigator
- 2015 EMBO Member
- 2018 Female Award of the German Stem Cell Network
- 2019 Profiled in Development
- 2023 Member of the Latin American Academy of Sciences
- 2023 Member of the German National Academy of Sciences Leopoldina
- 2025 Gottfried Wilhelm Leibniz Prize
- 2025 Bavarian Maximilian Order for Science and Art
