= Klaus Heinrich =

German philosopher (1927–2020)

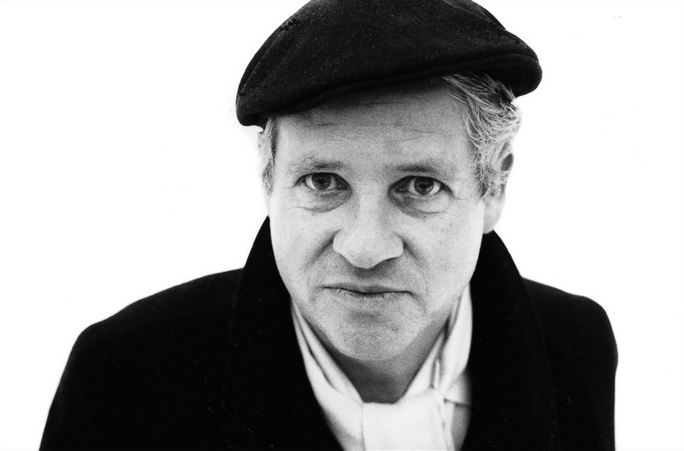
Klaus Heinrich (1982)

Klaus Heinrich (23 September 1927 – 23 November 2020) was a German philosopher of religion.

== Career ==
In 2002, he was awarded the Sigmund Freud Prize by the Deutsche Akademie für Sprache und Dichtung.

In 1948 he was a founding student member of the Free University of Berlin and from 1971 to 1995 he was a full professor for "Religious Studies on the Philosophy of Religion" at the Institute for Religious Studies. After training in psychoanalysis and studying law, philosophy, Protestant theology, sociology, art history and literary studies, first at the Friedrich-Wilhelms-Universität Unter den Linden in Berlin and then at the FU, he received his doctorate from the FU in 1952. In 1964 he completed his habilitation here Versuch über die Schwierigkeit nein zu sagen.

Michael Stausberg, historian of the study of religion, says of him:

Heinrich became famous in Berlin and beyond for his skills as an orator—being a speaker rather than a writer, many of his publications are reconstructed on the basis of recordings and notes of his students—, his teaching style, his immense learning and his political commitment to the ideals of a ‘free’ university. His work, which adopts key-elements from Tillich (‘origins’) and Freud (‘repression’), moves in the borderland between Greek mythology (Oedipus!) and philosophy. Many of his texts provide a philosophical-psychoanalytical exegesis of myths that takes visual culture (modern arts, the Renaissance) as its point of departure. Heinrich's dense style, often difficult to follow for the non-initiates, won him the prestigious Sigmund Freud-Award for Scientific Prose in 2002. Heinrich's approach to the study of religion is too unique and personal to be copied by others, but he had many students who were fascinated by his charisma.”

== Awards ==
- Sigmund Freud Prize
