= Norbert Miller =

German art historian

Norbert Miller (born 14 May 1937) is a German scholar of literature and art. He was professor of literary studies at the Technische Universität Berlin from 1973 and retired in 2006.

== Life ==
Born in Munich, Miller grew up in Berlin, Vienna and Munich and studied literature, musicology and art history in Frankfurt and Berlin. Around 1958 he came into contact with Walter Höllerer in Frankfurt, who became his teacher and friend. From 1962 to 1965 Miller was Höllerer's assistant at the Johann Wolfgang Goethe University Frankfurt am Main. Later he joined Hans Mayer as his assistant.

From 1973 Miller held a full professorship for Comparative Literature Studies at the TU Berlin. He was managing director of the institute there until 2004.

Miller is still the editor of the journal Language in the Technical Age and founded the Literarisches Colloquium Berlin together with Walter Höllerer.

== Achievements ==
Miller's research focuses on European literature, art and music of the 18th to 20th centuries. In particular, he has repeatedly researched the debates of European classicism between Winckelmann and Byron in numerous essays and books, whereby the aesthetics transfer processes between the arts are the focus of his representations. As an art scholar, he has been fascinated by the anti-classical tendencies in European art since the Enlightenment, and has shown them to be a source of inspiration with his books on Giovanni Battista Piranesi. (1978), Horace Walpole (1986) and William Beckford (2012) are dedicated to weighty monographs. At the centre of his research on music are the configurations of Romantic music, especially with regard to the history of Opera seria in the 19th century.

On various occasions - especially in the work on European Romanticism in Music (1999/ 2007) - he worked together with the musicologist Carl Dahlhaus. He is editor of the works of Goethe (Munich Edition), Jean Paul, Gérard de Nerval and Marie Luise Kaschnitz. Furthermore, he is co-editor of the critical edition of Nietzsches works.

== Memberships ==
- Deutsche Akademie für Sprache und Dichtung, Darmstadt
- Berlin-Brandenburgische Akademie der Wissenschaften, Berlin
- Academy of Arts, Berlin
- Akademie der Wissenschaften und der Literatur, Mainz
- PEN-Zentrum Deutschland, Darmstadt

== Honours and awards ==
- 2009: Goldene Goethe-Medaille of the Goethe-Gesellschaft Weimar
- 2010: Deutscher Sprachpreis
- 2010: Verdienstkreuz 1. Klasses Verdienstordens der Bundesrepublik Deutschland
- 2018: Bayerischer Maximiliansorden für Wissenschaft und Kunst

== Work ==
- Der empfindsame Erzähler. Untersuchungen an Romananfängen des 18. Jahrhunderts. Hanser Verlag, München 1968 (Phil. Diss. FU Berlin 1967)
- Archäologie des Traums. Versuch über Giovanni Battista Piranesi. Hanser Verlag, München 1978
- Einführung. In Paul Heyse. Eine Bibliographie, hrsg. von Werner Martin, Georg Olms Verlag, Hildesheim / New York 1978, S. V-XI.
- Strawberry Hill. Horace Walpole und die Ästhetik der schönen Unregelmäßigkeit. Hanser Verlag, Munich 1986
- Emanuel Geibel, Paul Heyse und das literarische München zur Zeit Maximilians II. In: "In uns selbst liegt Italien" – Die Kunst der Deutsch-Römer, edited by Christoph Heilmann, Hirmer Verlag, Munich 1987, pp. 29–37.
- Paul Heyse – der Bürger als Dichterfürst. Zur Neuausgabe der sämtlichen Werke. In: Paul Heyse – Gesammelte Werke. Reihe III, volume 5, Nachdruck Georg Olms Verlag, Hildesheim / Zürich / New York 1991, pp. 777–817.
- With Carl Dahlhaus: Europäische Romantik in der Musik. Two volumes, Stuttgart: Metzler, 1999/2007.
- Der Wanderer. Goethe in Italien. Hanser Verlag, Munich 2002
- Die ungeheure Gewalt der Musik. Goethe und seine Komponisten. Hanser Verlag, Munich 2009
- Fonthill Abbey. Die dunkle Welt des William Beckford. Hanser, Munich 2012, ISBN 978-3-446-23871-8
- Marblemania. Kavaliersreisen und der römische Antikenhandel. Deutscher Kunstverlag, Munich 2018, ISBN 978-3422074439.
