= Barbara Stollberg-Rilinger =

German historian (born 1955)

Barbara Stollberg-Rilinger FBA
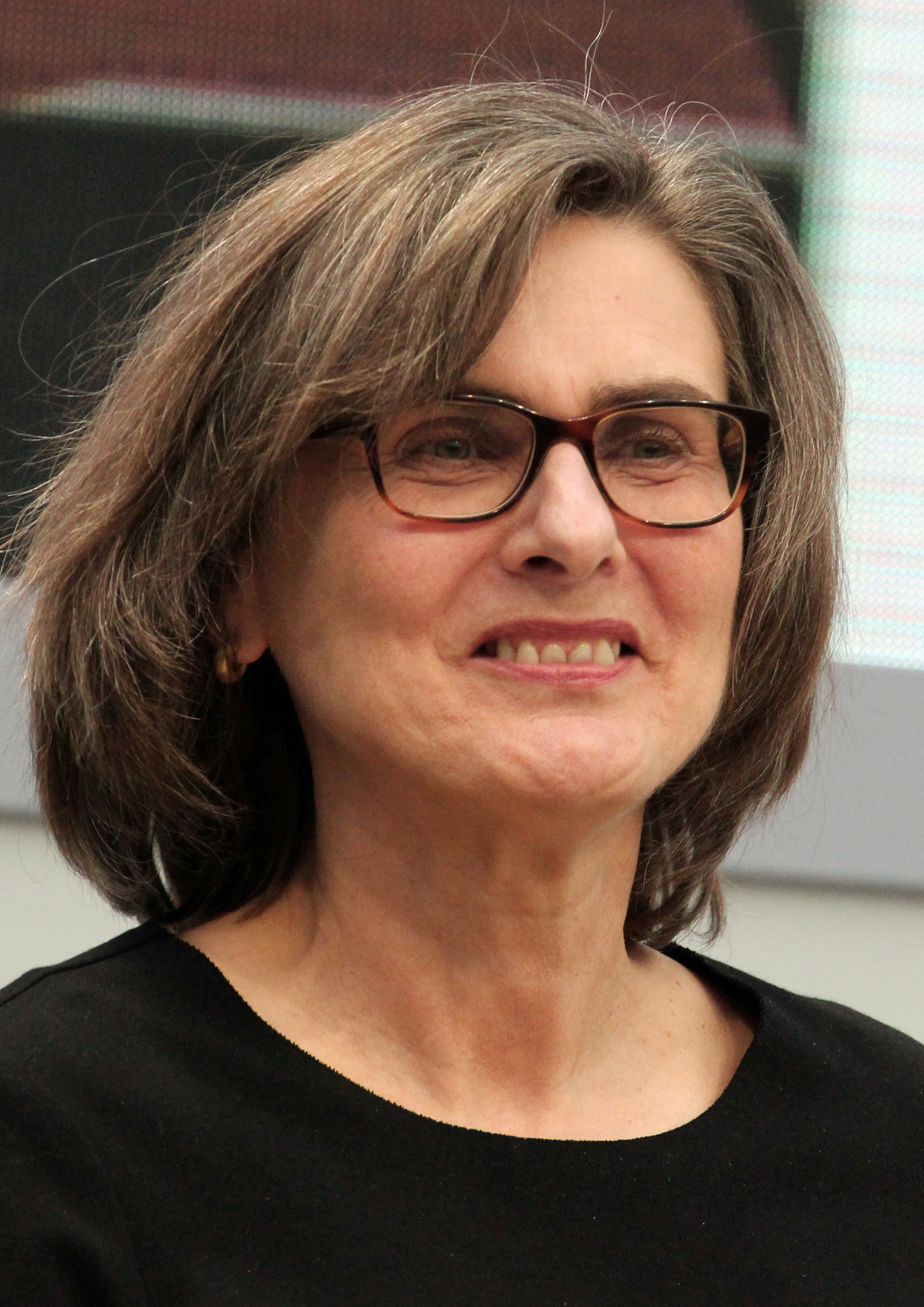
- Stollberg-Rilinger at Leipzig Book Fair, 2017
- Born: 15 July 1955 (age 70); Bergisch Gladbach, Germany
- Education: University of Cologne
- Occupation: Historian

Barbara Stollberg-Rilinger FBA (born 17 July 1955 in Bergisch Gladbach) is a German historian. She mainly researches the early modern period and has held the chair for early modern history at the University of Münster. Stollberg-Rilinger is one of the leading representatives of research that examines the constitutional history of the Holy Roman Empire on the basis of symbolic-ritual forms of communication. Her work on rituals, symbolic communication and ceremonial influenced research on the exercise of power in the pre-modern era.

== Career ==
She studied German language and literature, history and the history of art at the University of Cologne, graduating in 1980 and earning a doctorate in 1985 in mediaeval and modern history, ancient history and German philology. She habilitated at the University of Cologne in 1994. The first professorship she obtained was at the Historical Institute of the University of Cologne, only to follow a call from the University of Münster, where she has held the chair of Early Modern History since 1997. Since 2018, she has been a rector of the Berlin Institute for Advanced Study.

Her focus lies on the political and cultural movements and changes in Europe in the 17th and 18th century (the Age of Enlightenment).

== Political positions – Criticism by the "Jüdische Allgemeine" ==
In December 2020, Stollberg-Rilinger was one of the initiators of the "Initiative GG 5.3 Open-mindedness" of numerous institutions and persons in the cultural and scientific community. The initiative criticizes a Bundestag resolution of 2019 condemning Boycott, Divestment and Sanctions (BDS) as anti-Semitic and banning government funding for the Israel-hostile movement, and warns against a restriction of the Basic Law constitutionally protected freedom of expression through the "misuse of the accusation of anti-Semitism". The initiators and signatories were accused of ignoring the fact that BDS denied Israel's right to exist.

== Awards and honours ==
- 2017 Leipzig Book Fair Prize (non-fiction) for "Maria Theresia. Die Kaiserin in ihrer Zeit"
- In July 2017, Stollberg-Rilinger was elected a Corresponding Fellow of the British Academy (FBA), the United Kingdom's national academy for the humanities and social sciences.
- 2017 Sigmund Freud Prize for Scientific Prose: "Maria Theresia. Die Kaiserin in ihrer Zeit"
- 2013 Award of the Historical Collegium of the Bavarian Academy of Sciences and Humanities
- 2012 Innovation award of the federal state of North Rhine-Westphalia
- 2006 Doctorate honoris causa of the École normale supérieure de Lyon
- 2005 Gottfried Wilhelm Leibniz Prize of DFG

== Publications ==
- Stollberg-Rilinger, Barbara (1986). Der Staat als Maschine : zur politischen Metaphorik des absoluten Fürstenstaats. Historische Forschungen; Bd. 30. Berlin: Duncker & Humblot. ISBN 3-428-06022-9.
- —— (1999). Vormünder des Volkes? Konzepte landständischer Repräsentation in der Spätphase des Alten Reiches. Historische Forschungen; Bd. 64. Berlin: Duncker & Humblot. ISBN 3-428-09470-0.
- —— (2006). Das Heilige Römische Reich Deutscher Nation (in German). München: C.H.Beck. ISBN 978-3-406-53599-4.
- —— (Spring 2011). "Much ado about nothing? Rituals of politics in early modern Europe". Bulletin of the German Historical Institute. 48: 9–24.
- —— (2008). Des Kaisers alte Kleider (in German). München: C.H.Beck. ISBN 978-3-406-57074-2.
- —— (2022). Maria Theresa : the Habsburg empress in her time. Princeton, New Jersey: Princeton University Press. ISBN 978-0-691-17906-3. OCLC 1200832077.

== Literature ==
- Luebke, David M. (Spring 2011). "Too little ado about plenty : comment on Barbara Stollberg-Rilinger's lecture, Washington DC, November 11, 2011". Bulletin of the German Historical Institute. 48: 25–31.
