= Jürgen Osterhammel =

German historian

- Born: 1952 (age 73–74); Wipperfürth
- Occupations: Historian, academic

Academic background
- Education: University of Marburg; London School of Economics; University of Kassel (PhD)
- Thesis: Britischer Imperialismus im Fernen Osten: Strukturen der Durchdringung und einheimischer Widerstand auf dem chinesischen Markt 1932–1937 (1980)
- Doctoral advisor: Richard Lorenz
- Other advisor: Ian Nish

Academic work
- Discipline: Modern history
- Sub-discipline: History of China, global history
- Institutions: University of Freiburg (1986–1990); FernUniversität Hagen (1990–1996); Graduate Institute of International Studies (1997–1999); University of Konstanz (1999–2018); Freiburg Institute for Advanced Studies (since 2019)
- Notable works: The Transformation of the World: A Global History of the Nineteenth Century (2014)

Jürgen Osterhammel (born 1952 in Wipperfürth, North Rhine-Westphalia) is a German historian specialized in Chinese and world history. He is professor emeritus at the University of Konstanz.

== Academia ==
Osterhammel was educated at the Hohe Landesschule in Hanau, Hesse. He studied German literature, political science, history and Mandarin Chinese at the University of Marburg between 1970 and 1976. He held a German National Academic Foundation scholarship from 1974 to 1980. He was a postgraduate student in international history at the London School of Economics in 1976, working there for two years under the guidance of Ian Nish. In 1980, he obtained his PhD from the University of Kassel in modern history with a dissertation on British imperialism in the Far East, supervised by Richard Lorenz.

From 1982 to 1986, Osterhammel was a fellow at the German Historical Institute in London under the directorship of Wolfgang Mommsen. Between 1986 and 1990, he was a senior lecturer in political science at the University of Freiburg (Germany), completing his habilitation there in 1990. Osterhammel then worked for seven years as professor of modern history and chair of the centre for non-Western history at the FernUniversität Hagen, a distance-learning university and the university with the highest enrollment in Germany. He has also worked as a professor of modern history at the Graduate Institute of International Studies in Geneva before taking up the same position in the University of Konstanz (Germany) in 1999. In 2001–2002, Osterhammel was a fellow at the Netherlands Institute for Advanced Study in the Humanities and Social Sciences. In 2014, he was elected a Corresponding Fellow of the British Academy. He retired from the University of Konstanz in 2018 and joined the Freiburg Institute for Advanced Studies in Freiburg im Breisgau in 2019.

== Other activities ==
- Volkswagen Foundation, Member of the Board of Trustees

== Awards ==
- 2010: Gottfried Wilhelm Leibniz Prize from the German Research Foundation for "exceptional scientists and academics for their outstanding achievements in the field of research"
- 2014: Sigmund Freud Prize
- 2017: Pour le Mérite for Sciences and Arts
- 2017: Toynbee Prize
- 2018: Balzan Prize for Global History ("For his fundamental contribution to studies in global history and the definition of the discipline. For his method, which combines the rigour of empirical research while opening onto wide perspectives in an admirably balanced way, both through comparison and through the study of interconnected histories. For his elegant, fascinating style of writing")
- Honorary doctorate from the European University Institute, Florence

== Areas of research ==
- Colonialism
- Eurasian history since the 18th century
- History and theory of historiography
- World or global history

== Bibliography ==
- Mommsen, Wolfgang J.; —— (1987). Max Weber and his Contemporaries. London: Allen & Unwin. ISBN 0-04-301262-0. OCLC 13794249.
- —— (Spring 2003). "In search of a Nineteenth Century". Bulletin of the German Historical Institute. 32: 9–28. Archived from the original on 5 October 2017.
- —— (2005). Colonialism: A Theoretical Overview. Princeton, NJ: Markus Wiener Publishers. ISBN 978-1-55876-340-1. OCLC 56608067.
- —— (2005). Globalization: A Short History. Princeton, NJ: Princeton University Press. ISBN 978-0-691-13395-9. OCLC 57068352.
- —— (2014). The Transformation of the World: A Global History of the Nineteenth Century. Princeton, NJ: Princeton University Press. ISBN 978-0-691-16980-4. OCLC 850909580.
- Jansen, Jan C.; ——; Riemer, Jeremiah (2017). Decolonization: A Short History. Princeton, NJ. ISBN 978-1-4008-8488-9. OCLC 965716862.
- —— (2018). Unfabling the East: The Enlightenment's Encounter with Asia. Princeton, NJ: Princeton University Press. ISBN 978-0-691-17272-9. OCLC 1031214281.
- Huber, Valeska; —— (2020). Global Publics: Their Power and their Limits, 1870-1990. New York. ISBN 978-0-19-886577-3. OCLC 1139889294.
