= Otto Ribbeck =

German classical scholar (1827–1898)

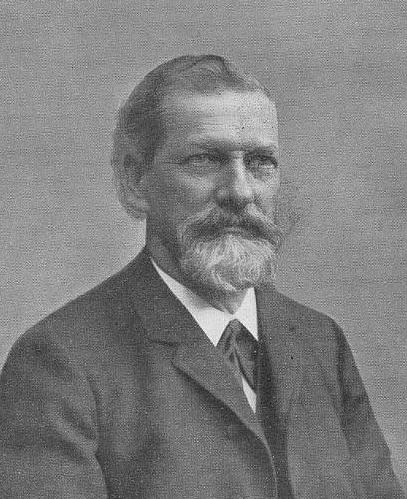
Johann Karl Otto Ribbeck

Johann Carl Otto Ribbeck (23 July 1827, in Erfurt – 18 July 1898, in Leipzig) was a German classical scholar. His works are mostly confined to criticisms of Latin poetry and to classical character sketches.

== Biography ==
He was born at Erfurt in Saxony. In early life he went to Berlin, where he studied under Karl Lachmann, Franz Bopp and August Böckh, and from there to Bonn where he was a close student of the methods of Friedrich Gottlieb Welcker and Friedrich Ritschl. Having received his degree in Berlin and traveled for a year through Italy, in 1853 he returned to Berlin, where he entered Böckh's school. He then taught at Elberfeld and Bern. Having held professorial appointments at Kiel and Heidelberg, he succeeded Ritschl in the chair of classical philology at Leipzig, where he died.

== Work ==
Ribbeck was the author of several standard works on the poets and poetry of Rome, the most important of which are the following: Geschichte der römischen Dichtung ("History of Roman poetry," 2nd ed., 1894–1900); Die römische Tragodie im Zeitalter der Republik ("Roman tragedy during the time of the republic," 1875); Scaenicae Romanorum Poesis Fragmenta, including the tragic and comic fragments (3rd ed., 1897).

As a textual critic he was distinguished by considerable rashness, and never hesitated to alter, rearrange or reject as spurious what failed to reach his standard of excellence. These tendencies are strikingly shown in his editions of the Epistles and Ars Poetica of Horace (1869), the Satires of Juvenal (1859) and in the supplementary essay Der echte und unechte Juvenal ("Genuine and fraudulent Juvenal," 1865). In later years, however, he became much more conservative.

His edition of Virgil (Vergilii Opera, with prolegomena and critical notes, 5 vols., 1859–69; 2nd ed., 1894–1895), although only critical, is a work of great erudition, especially the prolegomena. His biography of Ritschl (1879–1881) is one of the best works of its kind. The influence of Ritschl may be seen in Ribbeck's critical edition of the Miles gloriosus of Plautus, and in his Beiträge zur Lehre von den lateinischen Partikeln ("Contributions to the teachings on Latin particles"), a work of much promise, which causes regret that he did not publish further results of his studies in that direction. His miscellaneous Reden und Vorträge were published after his death (Leipzig, 1899). He took great interest in the monumental Thesaurus Linguae Latinae, and it was chiefly owing to his efforts that the government of Saxony was induced to assist its production by a considerable subsidy. Classical character sketches (which appeared in the Rheinische Museum, of which he became editor in 1876) include Alazon (1882), Kolax (1885) and Agrockos (1885).

== Bibliography ==
- Scaenicae romanorum poesis fragmenta, Lipsiae in aedibus B. G. Teubneri, 1852–55, vol. 1, vol. 2.
- Scaenicae romanorum poesis fragmenta, Lipsiae in aedibus B. G. Teubneri, 1871–73, 2nd edition, vol. 1, vol. 2.
- Scaenicae romanorum poesis fragmenta, Lipsiae in aedibus B. G. Teubneri, 1897–98, 3rd edition, vol. 1, vol. 2.
