= Eduard Wölfflin =

Swiss lexicographer and classical philologist (1831–1908)

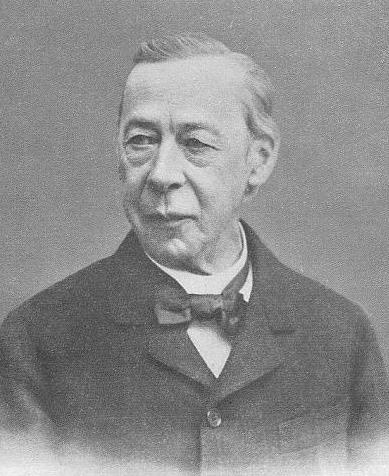
- Born: 1 January 1831; Basel, Switzerland
- Died: 8 November 1908 (aged 77); Basel, Switzerland
- Education: University of Göttingen; University of Basel
- Occupations: Lexicographer; Classical philologist
- Notable work: Thesaurus Linguae Latinae
- Children: Heinrich Wölfflin
- Awards: Bavarian Maximilian Order for Science and Art (1901)

Eduard Wölfflin (1 January 1831, Basel, Switzerland – 8 November 1908, Basel, Switzerland) was a Swiss classical philologist. He was the father of art historian Heinrich Wölfflin.

== Biography ==
Eduard Wölfflin was born in Basel on 1 January 1831. From 1848 to 1854, he studied at the University of Basel and the University of Göttingen, where he was a student of Karl Friedrich Hermann. Following graduation, he worked as an assistant librarian at the University of Basel (1854–61).

Wölfflin spent the next decade as schoolteacher in Winterthur (1861–71), and in the meantime became an associate professor in Latin philology (1869). In 1871, he attained a full professorship at the University of Zurich. From 1875 to 1880, Wölfflin was a professor at the University of Erlangen, and from 1880 to 1906, was a professor at the Ludwig-Maximilians-Universität München. Wölfflin was a member of the Bavarian Maximilian Order for Science and Art.

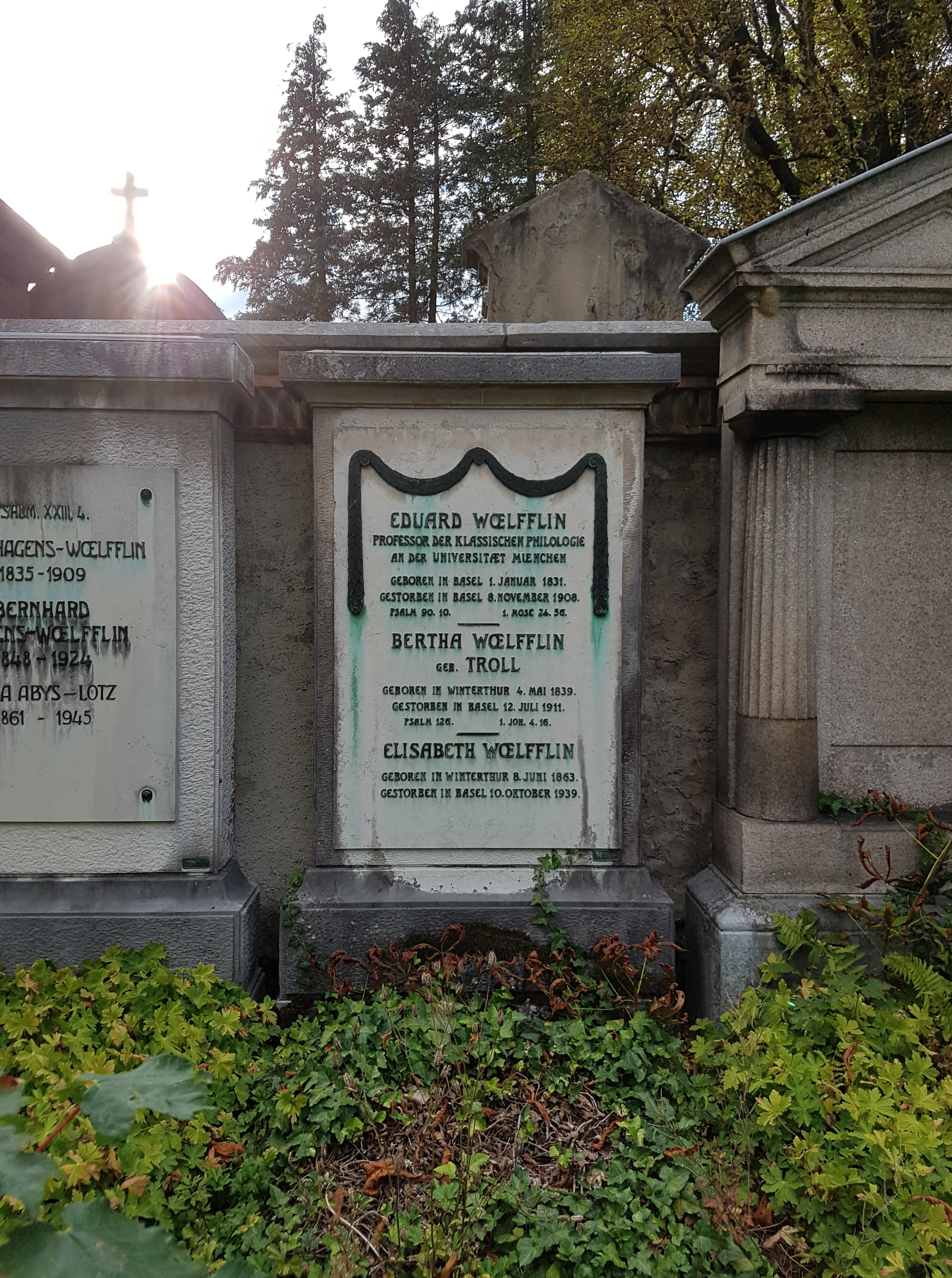
Eduard Wölfflin's grave on Wolfgottesacker in Basel

== Published works ==
He was a primary catalyst in the establishment of the Thesaurus Linguae Latinae, a comprehensive dictionary of the Latin language — a project that first got underway in 1894. He was also editor of the Archiv für lateinische Lexikographie und Grammatik (from 1884), a periodical that grown to 15 volumes at the time of Wölfflin's death in 1908. Other significant writings by Wölfflin include:

- De Lucii Ampelii libro Memoriali quaestiones criticae et historicae (dissertation). Göttingen 1854.
- Caecilii de Balbi nugis philosophorum quae sunt super, Basel 1855.
- Polyaeni libri octo strategicon, Leipzig 1860.
- Livianische Kritik und Livianischer Sprachgebrauch, Berlin 1864 – Critical examination of Livy.
- Publii Syri sententiae. Leipzig 1869
- Antiochos von Syrakus und Coelius Antipater, 1872 – Antiochus of Syracuse and Lucius Coelius Antipater.
- Lateinische und romanische Comparation, 1878 – Latin and Roman comparation.
- Zur Composition der Historien des Tacitus, 1901 – Composition on the histories of Tacitus.
