= Karl Theodor von Heigel =

German historian (1842–1915)

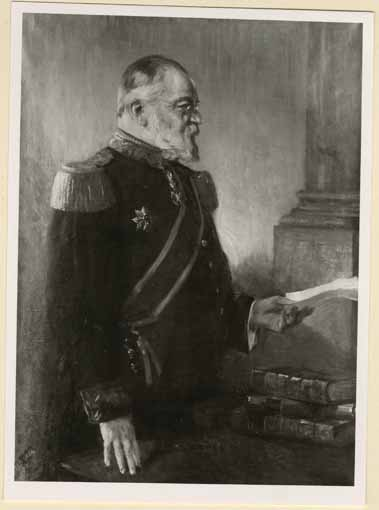
- Born: 23 August 1842; Munich, Germany
- Died: 23 March 1915 (aged 72); Munich, Germany
- Education: Ludwig-Maximilians-Universität München
- Occupation: Historian
- Relatives: Karl August von Heigel (brother)

Karl Theodor von Heigel (23 August 1842 in Munich – 23 March 1915 in Munich) was a German historian. He was the brother of novelist Karl August von Heigel.

He studied history at the Ludwig-Maximilians-Universität München, obtaining his habilitation for history in 1873. In 1879, he became an associate professor, and several years later, a full professor at the Polytechnic School of Munich. In 1885, he was appointed professor and director of the historical seminary at the Ludwig-Maximilians-Universität München.

In 1876, he became a member of the Bavarian Academy of Sciences. With Hermann von Grauert, he was editor of the Historische Abhandlungen (from 1891).

== Selected works ==
- Das Herzogthum Bayern zur Zeit Heinrichs des Löwen und Ottos I. von Wittelsbach (with Sigmund von Riezler, 1867) – The Duchy of Bavaria at the time of Henry the Lion and Otto I of Wittelsbach.
- Ludwig I. König von Bayern, 1872 – Ludwig I of Bavaria.
- Der Oesterreichische Erbfolgestreit und die Kaiserwahl Karls VII, 1877 – The Austrian Succession dispute and the imperial election of Charles VII.
- Die Wittelsbacher. Festschrift zur Feier des siebenhundertjährigen Regierungs-Jubiläums des Hauses Wittelsbach, 1880 – The Wittelsbacher. Festschrift in honor of 700 years of the Wittelsbach dynasty.
- Münchens Geschichte 1158–1806, 1880 – Munich history from 1158 to 1806.
- Quellen und Abhandlungen zur neuern Geschichte Bayerns (2 volumes, 1884–90) – Sources and essays on the modern history of Bavaria.

He was the author of many biographies in the Allgemeine Deutsche Biographie.
