= Sigmund von Riezler =

German historian

Sigmund Riezler or Siegmund Riezler (after 1900 von Riezler; 2 May or 5 May 1843, Munich – 28 January 1927, Ambach) was a German historian.

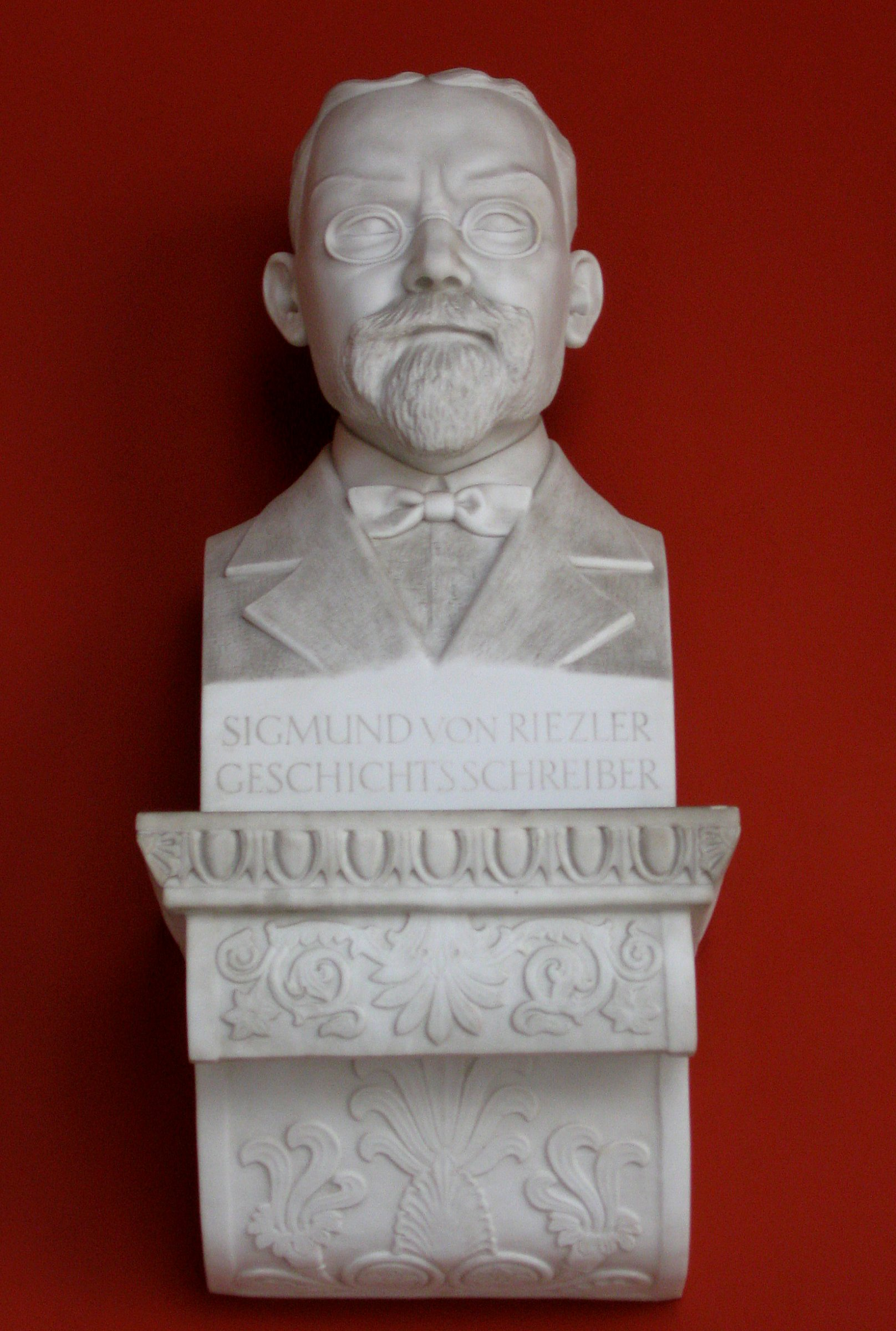
Bust of Sigmund von Riezler at the Ruhmeshalle (Munich).

== Biography ==
He was educated at the Ludwig-Maximilians-Universität München, and became a docent in 1869, and after ten years as head of the archives and library of Donaueschingen was made court and city librarian in Munich, in 1883, and director of the Maximilianeum in 1885.

== Works ==
His works, dealing for the most part with Bavarian history, include: Das Herzogtum Bayern zur Zeit Heinrichs des Löwen (1867, with Karl Theodor von Heigel), Der Kreuzzug Kaiser Friedrichs I. (1869), the great Geschichte Baierns (8 volumes, 1878–1932), Die bayrische Politik im Schmalkaldischen Kriege (1895), and Geschichte der Hexenprozesse in Bayern (1896).
