= Journal of Mind and Behavior =

- Discipline: Psychology, philosophy
- Language: English
- Edited by: Raymond C. Russ

Publication details
- History: 1980–present
- Publisher: University of Maine Dept. of Psychology on behalf of The Institute of Mind and Behavior (United States)
- Frequency: Quarterly

Standard abbreviations
- ISO 4: J. Mind Behav.

Indexing
- ISSN: 0271-0137
- OCLC no.: 6543005

Links
- Journal homepage

The Journal of Mind and Behavior is a peer-reviewed academic journal in psychology published by the University of Maine Department of Psychology on behalf of The Institute of Mind and Behavior.

The journal publishes theoretical articles and literature reviews on the philosophy of psychiatry, theories of consciousness, and treatises on the history of psychology, but not empirical work. In addition, the journal publishes critical notices and book reviews.

It is abstracted in PsycINFO/Psychological Abstracts, EMBASE/Excerpta Medica, EBSCO, Sociological Abstracts, and The Philosopher's Index.
