= Anke te Heesen =

German historian of science (born 1965)

Anke te Heesen (born 1965) is a German historian of science and professor for the History of Science at Humboldt-Universität zu Berlin. Her research focuses on the development and organization of knowledge in the 19th and 20th centuries.

Te Heesen studied cultural pedagogy at the Universität-Hildesheim (1985–1991) and received her Ph.D. from the University of Oldenburg in 1995. She worked as a research assistant at the Research Center for the European Enlightenment, Potsdam (1996/1997), the Deutsche Hygiene-Museum, Dresden (1998/1999), and the Max Planck Institute for the History of Science, Berlin (1999–2006). After acting as founding director of the Museum of the Universität Tübingen (MUT) (2006–2008), she was appointed as Professor for Empirical Cultural Studies at Tübingen (2008–2011), and then assumed her current position as Professor for the History of Knowledge at the History Department of Humboldt-Universität in 2011.

Anke te Heesen's study on the history of the research interview, in which she examines the Sources for History of Quantum Physics interview project headed by Thomas S. Kuhn will be published in German in 03/2022.

== Publications ==
Monographs

- (in print) Revolutionäre im Interview. Thomas Kuhn, Quantenphysik und Oral History. Berlin: Klaus Wagenbach Verlag, 2022
- The Newspaper Clipping. A Modern Paper Object. Manchester University Press, Manchester 2014, ISBN 978-0-7190-8702-8, translation of Der Zeitungsausschnitt. Ein Papierobjekt der Moderne. Fischer Taschenbuch Verlag, Frankfurt am Main 2006, ISBN 3-596-16584-9
- Theorien des Museums. Zur Einführung. Junius-Verlag, Hamburg 2012 (3rd edition 2015), ISBN 978-3-88506-698-9. Translated into Polish (2016) and Korean (2018).
- The world in a box: the story of an eighteenth-century picture encyclopedia. Chicago University Press, Chicago 2002, ISBN 0-226-32287-4, English translation of Der Weltkasten. Die Geschichte einer Bildenzyklopädie aus dem 18. Jahrhundert. Wallstein, Göttingen 1997, ISBN 3-89244-224-X.

Editorship (selection)

- jointly with Margarete Vöhringer: Wissenschaft im Museum – Ausstellung im Labor. Kulturverlag Kadmos, Berlin 2014 (ISBN 978-3-86599-223-9)
- jointly with Susanne Padberg: Musée Sentimental 1979. Ein Ausstellungskonzept, 2011 (ISBN 978-3-7757-3017-4)
- jointly with Anette Michels: auf/zu. Der Schrank in den Wissenschaften, 2007 (ISBN 3-05-004359-8)
- as guest-editor: Cut and paste um 1900. Der Zeitungsausschnitt in den Wissenschaften, Kaleidoskopien vol. 4/2002. Vertrieb Vice Versa (Berlin) 2002 (ISSN 1432-0118)
- jointly with Emma Spary: Sammeln als Wissen. Das Sammeln und seine wissenschaftshistorische Bedeutung, 2001 (ISBN 3-89244-482-X)

== Awards ==
- 2009 Translation Grant “Geisteswissenschaften international,” Börsenverein des Deutschen Buchhandels
- 2008 Aby Warburg Award, Aby-Warburg-Stiftung, Hamburg
