= Otto Immisch =

German classicist (1862–1936)

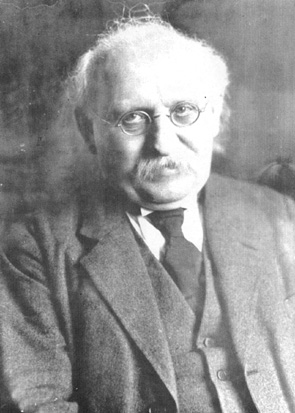

Otto Immisch (18 June 1862, Wartha, Lusatia - 29 October 1936, Freiburg im Breisgau) was a German classical scholar.

== Biography ==
He received his education at the University of Leipzig, was appointed lecturer there in 1889 and professor in 1896. From 1907 to 1913 he was professor at Giessen and in the latter year was appointed to a chair at Königsberg.

== Works ==
Publisher works include:

- Philologische Studien zu Plato ("Philological studies of Plato", 1896; 1903).
- Die innere Entwicklung des griechischen Epos ("The inner development of the Greek epic", 1904).
- Susemihl : Aristotelis Politica (editor, 1909).
- Wie studiert man klassische Philologie? ("How should classical philology be studied?", 1909).
- Das Erbe des Alten ("Inheritance from the ancients", 1911).
