= Thesaurus Linguae Latinae =

Historical dictionary of Latin

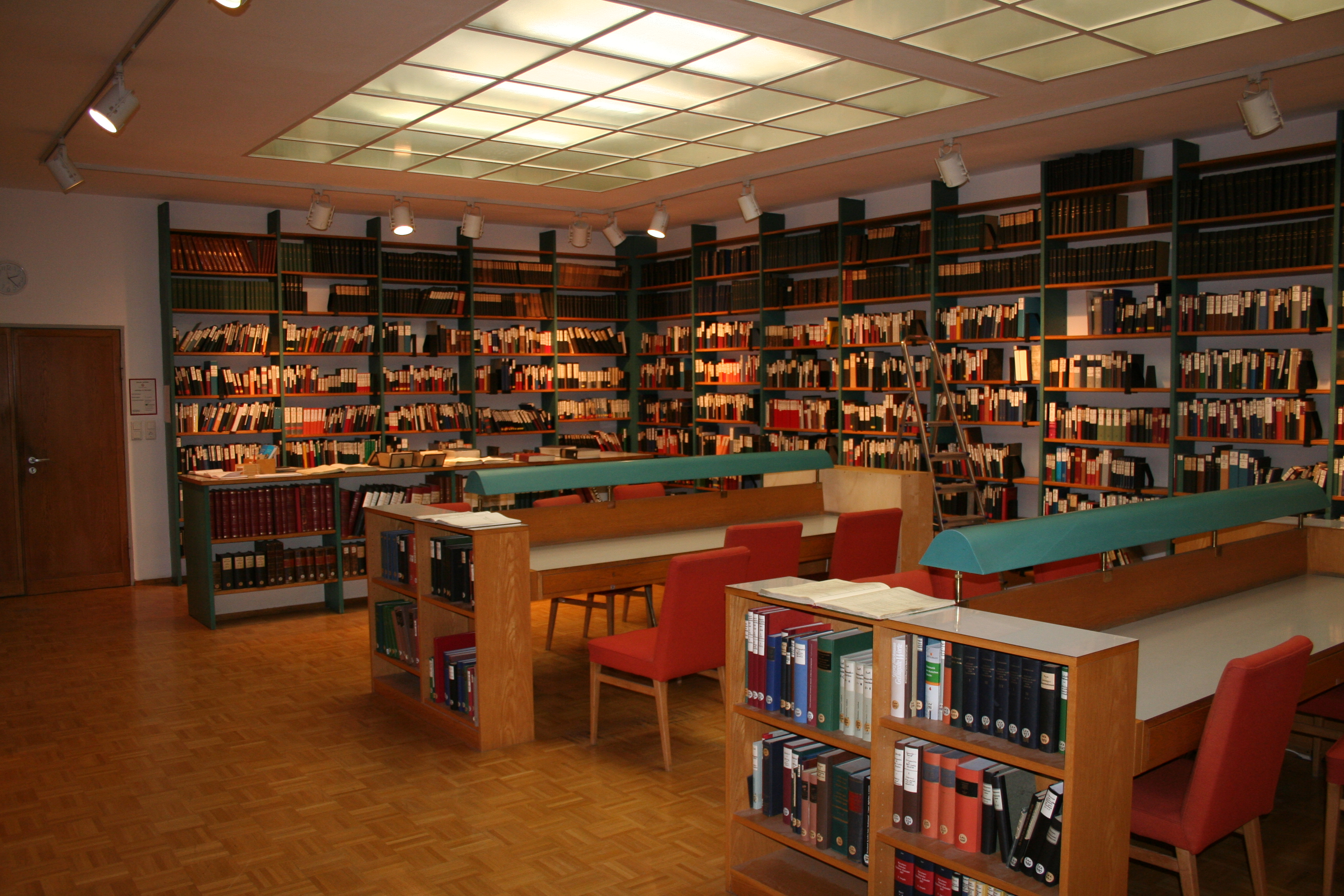
Library of the Thesaurus Linguae Latinae in Munich

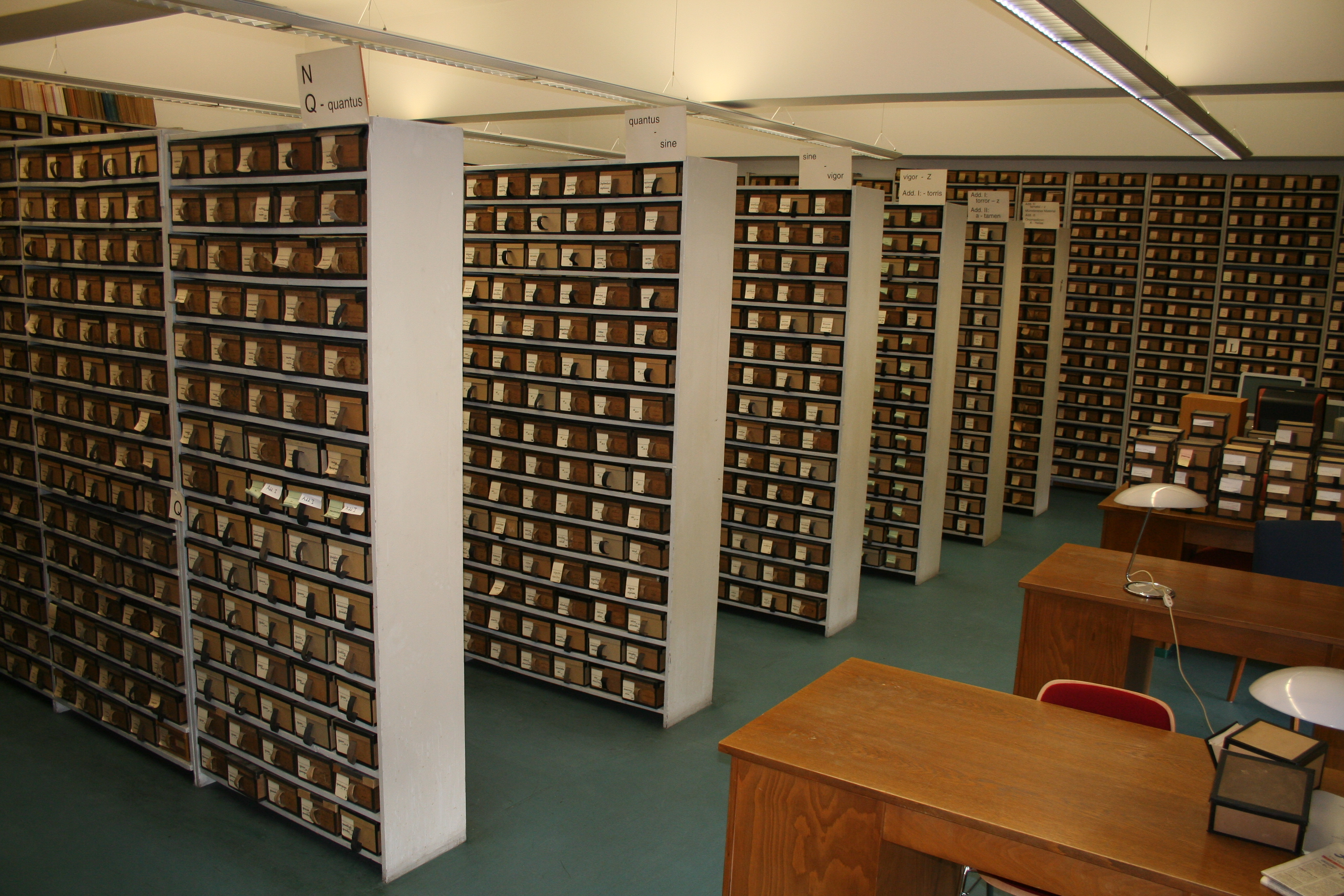
The stacks, in which each box contains numerous slips containing Latin writings, sorted into usage categories by word

The Thesaurus Linguae Latinae (abbreviated as ThLL or TLL) is a monumental dictionary of Latin founded on historical principles. It encompasses the Latin language from the time of its origin to the time of Isidore of Seville (died 636).

The project was founded in 1894 by Eduard Wölfflin and the first fascicle was published in 1900. At the time, the researchers thought it would take up to 20 years to complete the thesaurus. Today, it is expected that the work will be completed around the year 2050. The last fascicle of the P-volume appeared in 2010, and as of 2025 the work is underway on N and R. The institution that carries out the work of the dictionary is located in Munich, in the Bavarian Academy of Sciences and Humanities. Wölfflin described the entries in the TLL as "biographies" rather than definitions.

The offices of the TLL contain copies of all surviving Latin texts from 600 CE and earlier. The stacks contain boxes that collectively contain about 10 million slips on which is "every surviving piece of writing from the classical period", sorted into usage categories by word. For example, there are about 90,000 slips for the word 'et' and 50,000 for the word 'non'. These are used as source material to create entries for each word in the thesaurus.

In 2019, the TLL posted PDF copies of each entry on its website.
