= Bavarian Maximilian Order for Science and Art =

Civil Bavarian order

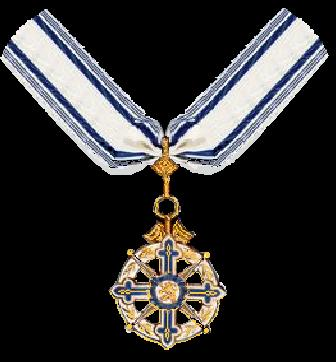

Awarded by the Minister-President of Bavaria
- Type: Order of Merit
- Established: 28 November 1853; 172 years ago 18 March 1980; 46 years ago (re-established)
- Country: Bavaria, Germany
- Eligibility: Preferably German scientists and artists
- Awarded for: Outstanding achievements in the field of science and art
- Status: Currently awarded
- Founder: Maximilian II

Statistics
- First induction: 1853
- Total inductees: 573 (as of 2018)

Precedence
- Next (higher): none (highest)
- Next (lower): Bavarian Order of Merit
- Ribbon bar of the order

The Bavarian Maximilian Order for Science and Art (German: Bayerischer Maximiliansorden für Wissenschaft und Kunst) was first established on 28 November 1853 by King Maximilian II of Bavaria. It is awarded to acknowledge and reward excellent and outstanding achievements in the field of science and art. From 1933 onwards (with the beginning of the Nazi regime) the order was no longer awarded, until 1980 when it was reinstated by the then Minister-President of the Free State of Bavaria Franz Josef Strauß. Munich jewellers Hemmerle have been responsible for making the medal since 1905.

== Preamble ==
In continuation of a Bavarian tradition, the Bavarian Maximilian Order for Science and Art was created. It is awarded to reward outstanding achievements in the field of science and art (in Fortsetzung alter bayerischer Tradition wird der Bayerische Maximiliansorden für Wissenschaft und Kunst geschaffen. Mit ihm sollen herausragende Leistungen auf dem Gebieten von Wissenschaft und Kunst ausgezeichnet werden).

== Criteria ==
The Maximilian Order is preferably awarded to German scientists and artists. It is not restricted to citizens of Bavaria. The order was instituted in one class and two sections (science and art). The order is restricted to 100 living members.

== Nomination procedure ==
The Minister-President, the minister of state for their respective portfolio, and the two sections of the order are eligible to nominate new members. These proposals are evaluated by an advisory committee (Ordensbeirat). It gives its recommendation to the Minister-President for the final decision.

The advisory committee consists of:

- the President of the Landtag of Bavaria,
- the member of the government who is deputy of the Minister-President,
- the State Minister of Sciences, Research and the Arts,
- the President of the Bavarian Academy of Sciences and Humanities,
- the President of the Bavarian Academy of Fine Arts,
- the President of one of the Bavarian Art Colleges (Kunsthochschulen),
- the President of one of the Bavarian Universities and
- a representative of the applied sciences, who is named by the Minister-President.

All members of the advisory committee are selected for a period of five years. The committee decides with the majority of its members.

== Members ==
From 1980 to December 2025 the order has been awarded to 255 recipients. The number of living members of the order cannot exceed 100. As of December 2025 there are 95 living members of the order.

From 1853 to 1932 the order has been issued 351 times.
