= Schöll =

Schöll or Schoell is a German surname. Notable people with the surname include:

- Adolf Schöll (1805–1882), German classical archaeologist, philologist and art historian
- Rudolf Schöll (1844–1893), German classical philologist
- Fritz Schöll (1850–1919), German classical philologist
- Hubert Schöll (1946–1992), German footballer
- Maximilian Samson Friedrich Schoell (1766–1833), German historian, author of Cours d'histoire des états européens (París, 1830–1834, 46 vol.)
- William Schoell (born 1958), American writer, biographer and film historian

== See also ==
- Scholl
- Schell (disambiguation)
