= Richard Wachsmuth =

Richard Wachsmuth may refer to:

- Richard Wachsmuth (physicist), German physicist and academic
- Richard Wachsmuth (teacher), German classical philologist and teacher
