= Gottfried Bernhardy =

German philologist and historian

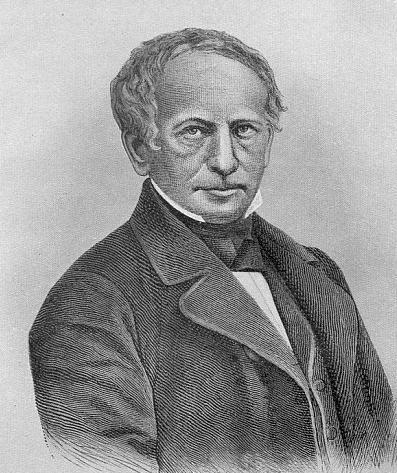
- Born: 14 March 1800; Landsberg (Warthe), Prussia
- Died: 14 May 1875 (aged 75); Halle an der Saale, Prussia
- Occupation: Philologist

Gottfried Bernhardy (20 March 1800 – 14 May 1875), German philologist and literary historian, was born at Landsberg an der Warthe (now Poland) in the Neumark.

== Life ==
He was the son of Jewish parents in reduced circumstances. Two well-to-do uncles provided the means for his education, and in 1811 he entered the Joachimsthal gymnasium at Berlin. In 1817 he went to Berlin University to study philology, where he had the advantage of hearing F. A. Wolf (then advanced in years), August Böckh and Philipp Karl Buttmann. In 1822, he took the degree of doctor of philosophy at Berlin, and in 1825 became an associate professor. In 1829, he succeeded Christian Carl Reisig as professor and director of the philological seminary at Halle, and in 1844 was appointed chief librarian of the university.

== Works ==
The most important of Bernhardy's works were his histories (or sketches) of Greek and Roman literature:

- Grundriss der römischen Litteratur (5th ed., 1872)
- Grundriss der griechischen Litteratur:
  - Pt. i, Introduction and general view, 1836.
  - Pt. ii, Greek poetry, 1845.
  - pt. iii, Greek prose literature, was never published.

A fifth edition of pts. i. and ii., by R. Volkmann, began in 1892. Other works by Bernhardy are:

- Eratosthenica (1822); a book involving Eratosthenes.
- Dionysius Periegetes Graece et Latine (1828); a book involving Dionysius Periegetes.
- Wissenschaftliche Syntax der griechischen Sprache (1829, suppts. 1854, 1862) – Scientific syntax of the Greek language.
- Grundlinien zur Encyclopädie der Philologie (1832) – Basic orientation for an encyclopedia of philology.
- a monumental edition of the "Lexicon" of Suidas; project completed in 1853.
- an edition of F. A. Wolf's "Kleine Schriften", two volumes (1869).
