= Fritz Schöll =

German classical philologist

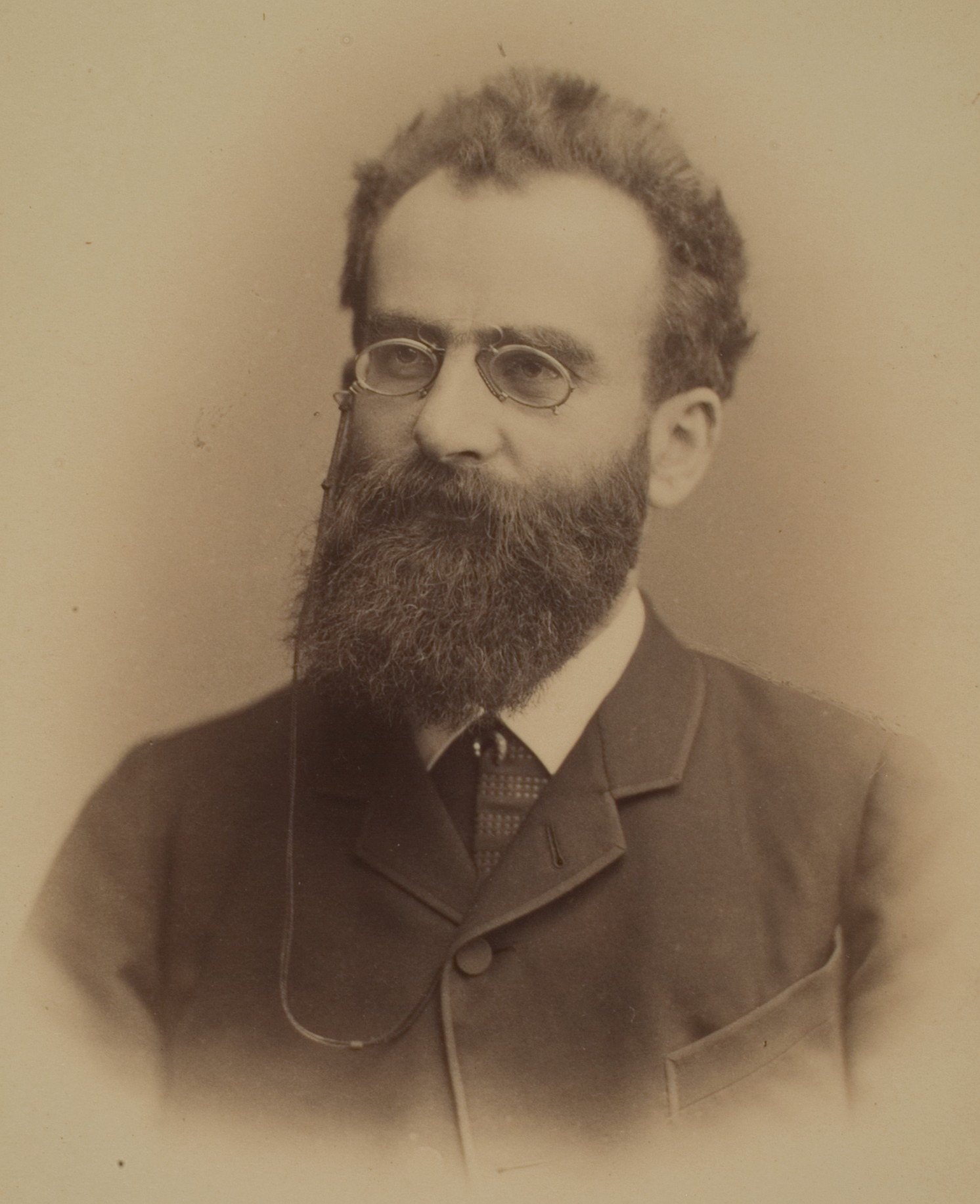
Fritz Schöll (ca. 1880)

Friedrich "Fritz" Schöll (8 February 1850 – 14 September 1919) was a German classical philologist, known for his editions of Plautus, Varro and Cicero. He was the son of archaeologist Gustav Adolf Schöll (1805–1882) and the brother of philologist Rudolf Schöll (1844–1893).

He was born in Weimar on 8 February 1850. He studied at the universities of Göttingen and Leipzig, obtaining his habilitation in 1876. From 1877 he was a professor of classical philology at the University of Heidelberg. He died in Rottweil on 14 September 1919.

== Published works ==
He was co-editor of a four volume work on the comedies of Plautus, titled T. Macci Plauti Comoediae recensuit instrumento critico et prolegomenis. In 1901 he published an edition of Erwin Rohde's smaller works (Kleine schriften), and in 1902 with Elisabeth Förster-Nietzsche, he published Friedrich Nietzsches briefwechsel mit Erwin Rohde ("Friedrich Nietzsche's correspondence with Erwin Rohde"). Accordingly, this correspondence was also issued in Friedrich Nietzsches Gesammelte Briefe ("Friedrich Nietzsche's collected letters"; 5 volumes, 1902–09; co-authors: Elisabeth Förster-Nietzsche, Peter Gast and Curt Wachsmuth). The following list is some of Schöll's classical writings:

- Analecta Plautina, 1877 (with Georg Goetz and Gustav Löwe).
- M. Terenti Varronis De lingua Latina libri quae supersunt, 1910 (edition of Marcus Terentius Varro; with Georg Goetz).
- Über zwei sich entsprechende trilogien des Euripides, 1910 – On two corresponding trilogies of Euripides.
- Menanders Perinthia in der Andria des Terenz, 1912 – Menander's Perinthia in the Andria of Terence.
- M. Tulli Ciceronis scripta quae manserunt omnia. 29, Orationum deperditarum fragmenta, 1917 (edition of Cicero).
