= Wilhelm Studemund =

German classical philologist

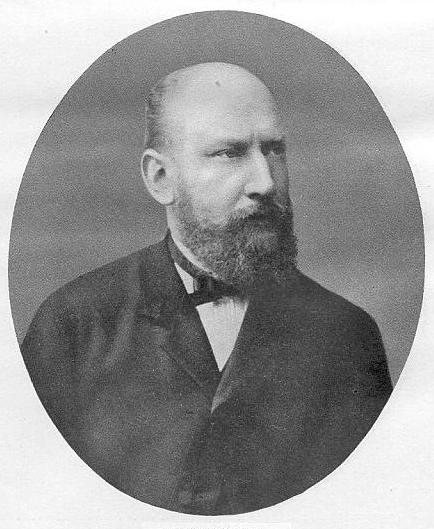
Wilhelm Studemund

Wilhelm Studemund (3 July 1843, in Stettin – 8 August 1889, in Breslau) was a German classical philologist, known for his decipherment of the Ambrosian palimpsest of Plautus.

He studied philology at the University of Berlin under August Boeckh and Moritz Haupt, and at the University of Halle as a student of Theodor Bergk. He received his doctorate in 1864, and then spent several years in Italy, during which time, he devoted his energy to the deciphering of palimpsests. In 1868 he became an associate professor at the University of Würzburg, and soon afterwards, he attained a full professorship. In 1870 he relocated to the University of Greifswald.

In 1872 he was named a professor at the University of Strasbourg, and during following year, appointed chairman of the scientific examination board for school candidates. In 1882 he became a member of the high school council for Alsace-Lorraine. As an advisor to Edwin von Manteuffel, he was the target of frequent verbal attacks at Strasbourg. Following the death of Manteuffel in 1885, he relocated as a professor to the University of Breslau.

He was founder and editor of the journal Breslauer philologische Abhandlungen.

== Selected works ==
- De canticis Plautinis (dissertation, 1864).
- Commentatio de Vidularia Plautina (edition of Plautus, 1870).
- Emendationes Plautinae (1871).
- Analecta Liviana (with Theodor Mommsen, 1873).
- Gaii institutionum commentarii quattuor; Codicis Veronensis, etc. (edition of Gaius, 1874).
- Studien auf dem Gebiete des archaischen Lateins (3 volumes, 1873–91).
- Anecdota varia Graeca musica metrica grammatica (with Rudolf Scholl, 1886).
- T. Macci Plauti fabularum reliquiae Ambrosianae Codicis, (1889).
