= Dionysius Periegetes =

2nd century AD Greek travel writer

Dionysius Periegetes (Ancient Greek: Διονύσιος ὁ Περιηγητής, literally Dionysius the Voyager or Traveller, often Latinized to Dionysius Periegeta), also known as Dionysius of Alexandria or Dionysius the African, was the author of a description of the then-known world in 1186 lines of Greek hexameter verse. He is believed to have been from Alexandria and to have lived around the time of Hadrian (r. 117–138), though some date his lifetime as late as the end of the 3rd century.

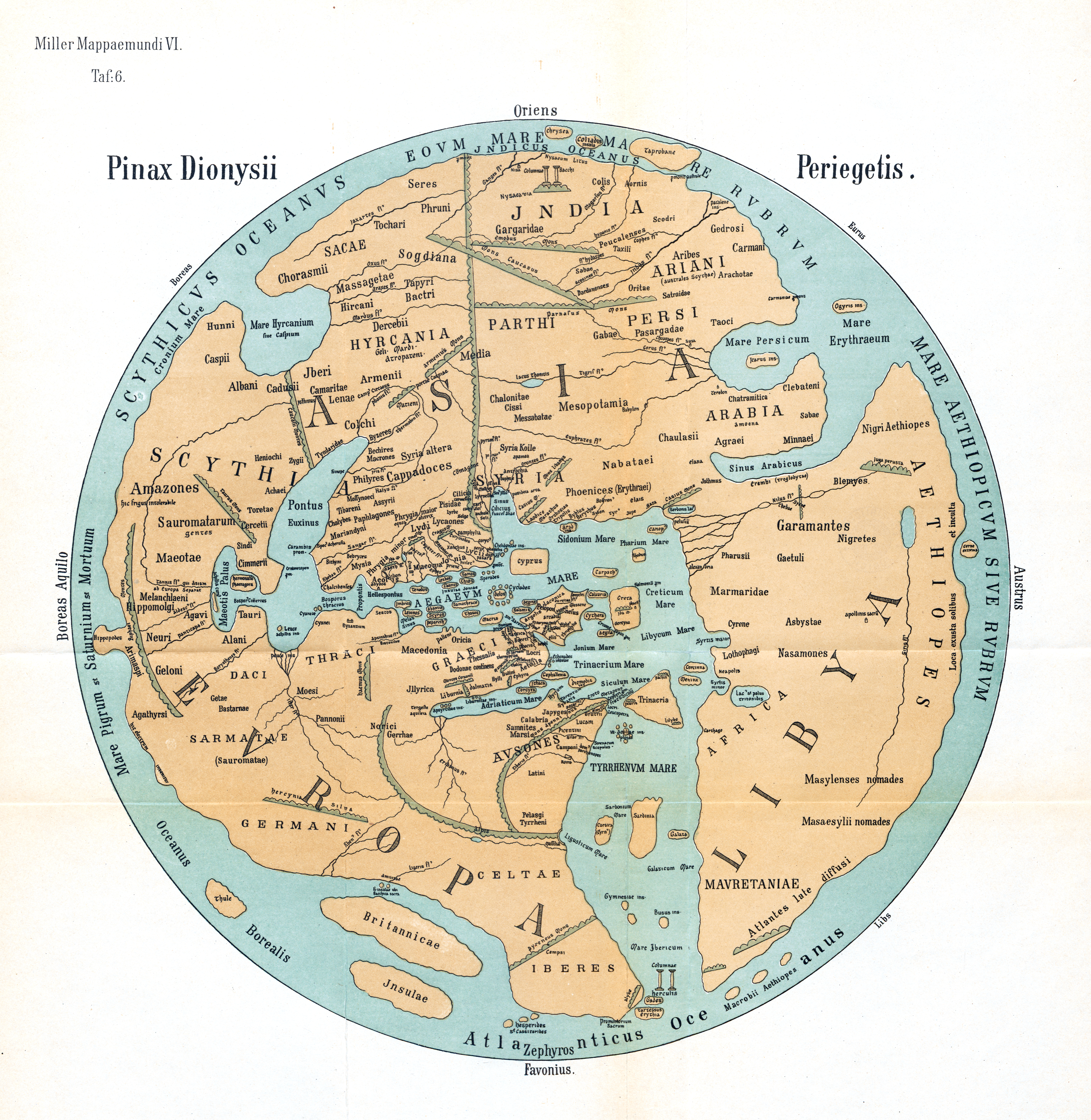
Map based on Dionysius

The work enjoyed popularity in ancient times as a schoolbook. It was translated into Latin by Rufius Festus Avienius, and by the grammarian Priscian. Archbishop Eustathius of Thessalonica wrote a commentary on his work for John Doukas.

== Editions and translations ==
- Twyne, Thomas, ed. (1572). The Surveye of the World, or Situation of the Earth, so muche as is inhabited. London.
- Dionysius Periegetes (1705). Ursin, Georg Heinrich (ed.). Οἰκουμένης περιήγησις – Dionysii Orbis Terrae Descriptio. Ratisbon.
- Bernhardy, Gottfried, ed. (1828). Geographi Graeci minores ... 1. Dionysius Periēgētes Graece et Latine cum vetustis commentariis et interpretationibus. Leipzig.: reprinted Hildesheim: Olms, 1974 ISBN 3-487-04910-4 (this book contains also Eustathius' comment, the scholia, Avienius' Descriptio orbis terrarum and Priscian's Periegesis).
- Müller, Karl, ed. (1861). Geographi Graeci minores e codicibus recognovit prolegominis annotatione instruxit tabulis aeri incisis illustravit Carolus Mullerus ... 2. Orbus descriptio. Bibliotheca scriptorum Graecorum. Vol. 26. Paris: Didot.: reprinted Hildesheim: Olms, 1974 ISBN 3-487-04911-2.
- Free, John (1789). Tyrocinium geographicum Londinense, or, The London geography, consisting of Dr. Free's Short lectures, compiled for the use of his pupils, to which is added by the editor, translated from the Greek into English blank verse, the Periegesis of Dionysius ... from the edition of Dr. Wells, containing the antient and modern science. London.
- Jacob, Christian (1990). La Description de la terre habitée de Denys d'Alexandrie ou la leçon de géographie (in French). Paris: Albin Michel. ISBN 2-226-03958-9.
- Dionisio di Alessandria (2005). Amato, Eugenio (ed.). Descrizione della Terra abitata (in Italian). Milan: Bompiani Testi a fronte. ISBN 88-452-3372-3.
- Khan, Yumna. "Dionysius of Alexandria, Description of the Known World".
- Dionysius Periegetes (2014). Lightfoot, J.L. (ed.). Description of the Known World. Oxford: Oxford University Press. ISBN 978-0-19-967558-6.
