= Adolf Schöll =

German art historian, archaeologist and classical philologist

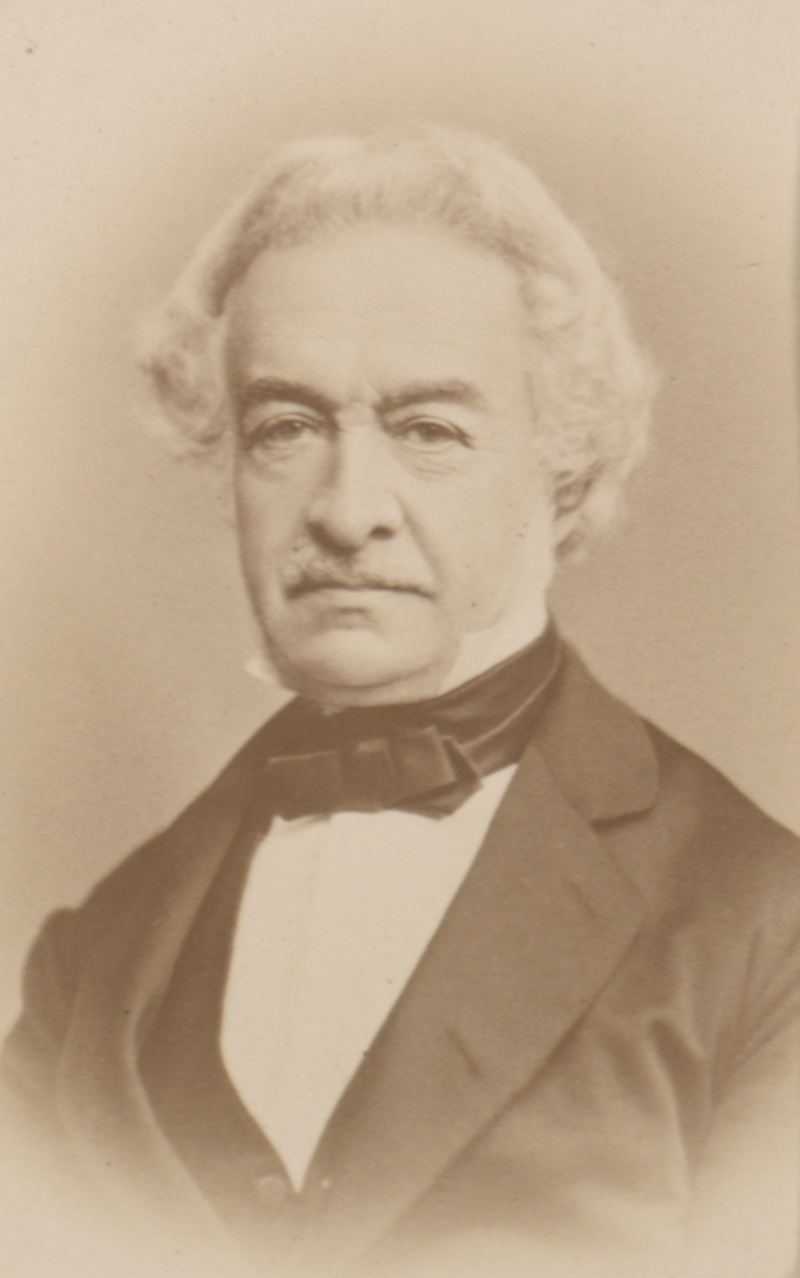
- Born: 2 September 1805; Brno, Austrian Empire
- Died: 26 May 1882 (aged 76); Jena
- Education: University of Göttingen, University of Tübingen

Gustav Adolf Schöll (2 September 1805 – 26 May 1882) was a German art historian, archaeologist and classical philologist.

== Biography ==
Schöll was born on 2 September 1805 in Brno. He studied at the universities of Tübingen and Göttingen, obtaining his habilitation at Berlin in 1833. In June 1837 he was appointed professor of rhetoric, classical philology, aesthetics and art history at the Imperial University of Dorpat. In 1839/40, with Karl Otfried Müller, he participated in a study trip to Italy and Greece.

In 1842, he was named an associate professor of archaeology at the University of Halle and, the following year, became Director of the Grand Ducal art collections and the Weimar Princely Free Drawing School in Weimar. In 1861, he was appointed head of the Grand Ducal Library and retired from his position at the drawing school.

Also in 1842, he married Johanna Henle (1816-1894), sister of the pathologist, Friedrich Gustav Jakob Henle. They had a daughter and four sons; including the classical philologists, Rudolf Schöll and Fritz Schöll.

== Selected works ==
- Herodot's von Halikarnass Geschichte, 1828 – Herodotus of Halicarnassus.
- Beiträge zur Kenntniss der tragischen Poesie der Griechen, 1839 – On the tragic poetry of the Greeks.
- Sophokles, sein Leben und Wirken, 1842 – Sophocles, his life and work.
- Archaeologische Mittheilungen aus Griechenland, 1843 (with Karl Otfried Müller) – Archaeological communications from Greece.
- Der Cyklop : ein Satyrspiel, 1851 (by Euripides; German edition) – The Cyclops, a satyr play.
- Gründlicher Unterricht über die Tetralogie des attischen Theaters und die Kompositionsweise des Sophokles, 1859 – On the tetralogy of the Attic theater and the compositional style of Sophocles.
- Gesammelte Aufsätze zur klassischen Literatur alter und neuerer Zeit, 1884 – Collected essays on classical literature of ancient and modern times.
- Goethe in hauptzügen seines lebens und wirkens, 1889 – Goethe in the main features of his life and work.
