= Scholl =

Scholl is a surname. Notable people with the surname include:

- Amalie Scholl (1823–1879), German composer
- Andreas Scholl (born 1967), German countertenor
- Aurélien Scholl (1833–1902), French journalist and writer
- Blake Scholl (born 1981), American tech entrepreneur
- Chiara Scholl (born 1992), American tennis player
- Eddie Scholl (born 1944), Dutch chess master
- Edward T. Scholl (1937–2003), American politician
- Elisabeth Scholl (born 1966), German soprano
- Hans Scholl (1918–1943), member of the White Rose resistance movement in Nazi Germany
- Hans Scholl (astronomer) (born 1942), German astronomer
- Inge Scholl (1917–1998), German activist
- Mehmet Scholl (born 1970), German footballer
- Robert Scholl (1891–1973), German politician
- Roland Scholl (1865–1945), Swiss-German chemist
- Sophie Scholl (1921–1943), member of the White Rose resistance movement in Nazi Germany
- William Scholl (1882–1968), US chiropodist and inventor of Dr. Scholl's brand footwear

== See also ==
- Dr. Scholl's, a foot care brand also simply known as "Scholl" in some countries
- Hans and Sophie Scholl
- Schöll
- Schull (disambiguation)
