= Otto Hense =

German classical philologist

- Born: 11 April 1845; Halberstadt
- Died: 11 March 1931 (aged 85); Freiburg im Breisgau
- Occupation: German classical philologist

Kurt Otto Friedrich Hense (11 April 1845, Halberstadt – 11 March 1931, Freiburg im Breisgau) was a German classical philologist known for his investigations of Sophocles and the anthologist Stobaeus.

In 1868 he obtained his doctorate from the University of Halle with the dissertation thesis, Exercitationes criticae imprimis in Euripidis fragmentis. After graduation, he worked as a gymnasium teacher, and in 1872 received his habilitation for classical philology at the University of Halle. From 1876 to 1909 he was a professor at the University of Freiburg, where in 1893/94 he served as university vice-rector.

== Published works ==
With historian Curt Wachsmuth, he was co-author of a five-volume edition of Stobaeus, titled Ioannis Stobaei Anthologium, with volumes 1-2 containing the Eclogae physicae et ethicae and being edited by Wachsmuth (1884), and volumes 3-5 containing the Florilegium and being edited by Hense (1894–1912). Other significant works associated with Hense are:

- Heliodoreische Untersuchungen, 1870 – Studies on Heliodorus.
- Der Chor des Sophokles, 1877 – The chorus of Sophocles.
- Studien zu Sophokles, 1880 – Studies of Sophocles.
- Aischylos Agamemnon, 1883 – edition of Aeschylus' Agamemnon, (Friedrich Wilhelm Schneidewin's annotated edition revised by Hense).
- Nicolaus Schow und Stobaeus, 1885 – Nicolaus Schow and Stobaeus.
- Teletis reliquiae, 1889 – edition of Teles.
- Die Synkrisis in der antiken Litteratur: Prorectoratsrede, 1893 – The syncrisis in ancient literature.
- Seneca und Athenodorus, 1893 – Seneca and Athenodorus.
- Die Modificirung der Maske in der griechischen Tragödie, 1902, second edition 1905 – The modification of the mask in Greek tragedy.
- Reliquiae. edidit O. Hense, 1905 – edition of Musonius Rufus.
