= Richard Wachsmuth (teacher) =

German classical philologist and teacher

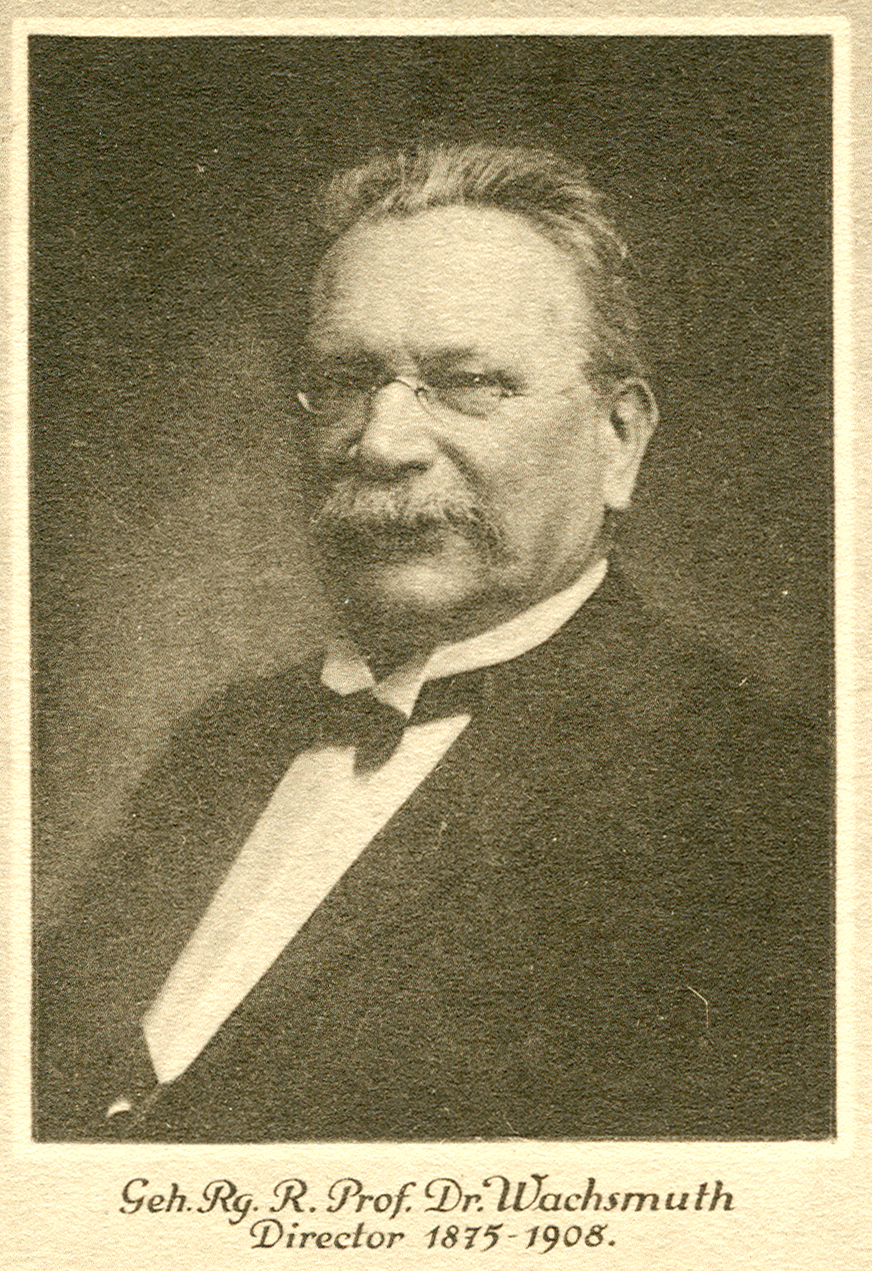
Wachsmuth

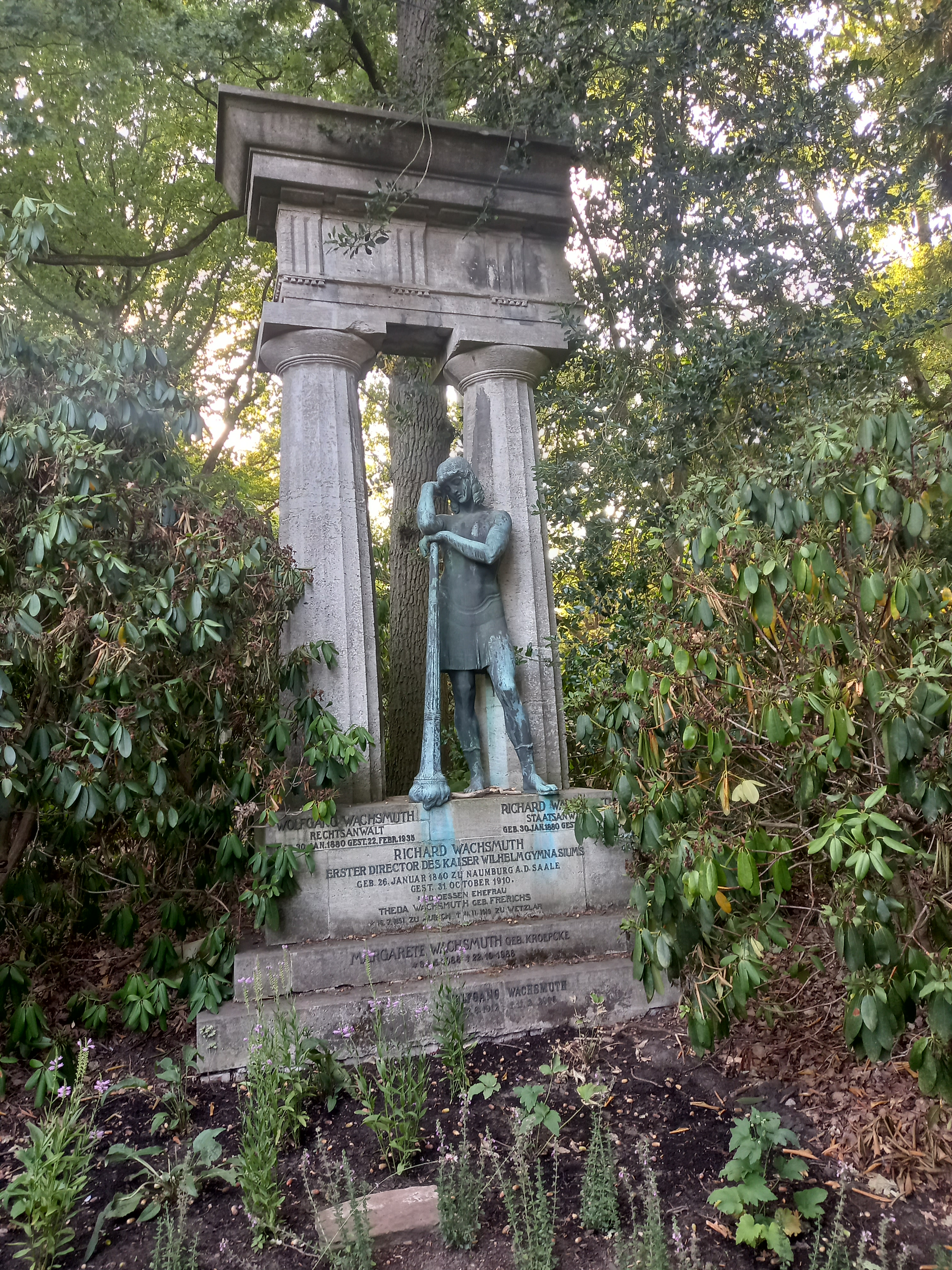
His and his wife Theda's grave at the Stadtfriedhof Stöcken in Hannover

Richard Wachsmuth (26 January 1840 - 31 October 1910) was a German classical philologist and teacher, as well as first director of Hannover's Kaiser Wilhelm-Gymnasium. He was the son of the lawyer Julius (1803-1877), brother of the philologist Curt Wachsmuth (1837-1905) and uncle of the experimental physicist Richard Wachsmuth (1868-1941).

== Family ==
Born in Naumburg an der Saale, he attended the Domgymnasium Naumburg and then from 1853 to 1858 the Landesschule Pforta. He studied at the universities of Heidelberg, Jena, Bonn and Berlin and gained his doctorate in 1863. He then passed his staatsexamen in Bonn. In 1861, during his studies, he became a member of the Burschenschaft Alemannia Bonn. From 1863 to 1874 he taught at a gymnasium in Posen, then in 1873 accepted a post as senior teacher at a gymnasium in Emden, where he remained for two years.

In 1875 he married Theda Frerichs, daughter of a medical officer in Aurich and became director of Hannover's new Kaiser-Wilhelm-Gymnasium. In 1900 he published the sixteen-page Festrede zur Feier des fünfundzwanzigjährigen Bestehens des Kaiser Wilhelms Gymnasiums zu Hannover, gehalten am 28. September 1900 through the Jänecke publishing house. He had a stroke in 1907 and retired the following year, dying in Hannover in 1910 and being buried in grave 36, section A17 of the city's Stadtfriedhof Stöcken.

== Bibliography ==
- (in German) Franz Kössler: Personenlexikon von Lehrern des 19. Jahrhunderts, Bd. Waag - Wytzes. Universitätsbibliothek, Gießen 2008; online
