= Georg Goetz =

German classical philologist

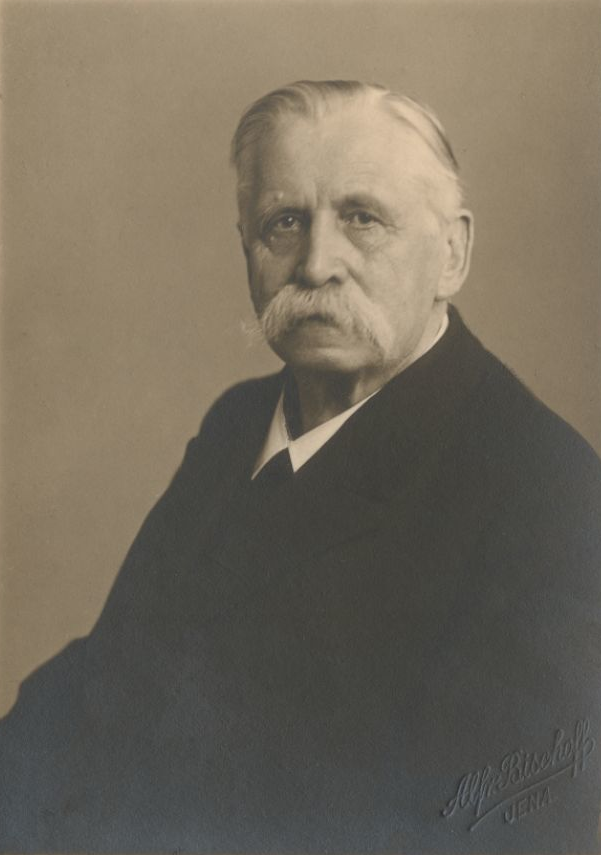
- Born: 3 November 1849; Gompertshausen, Thuringia, German Confederation
- Died: 1 January 1932 (aged 82); Jena, Thuringia, Weimar Republic

Academic background
- Education: Leipzig University
- Thesis: De temporibus Ecclesiazuson Aristophanis (1874)

Georg Goetz (3 November 1849, in Gompertshausen – 1 January 1932, in Jena) was a German classical philologist, known for his scholarly treatment of Plautus and Varro.

From 1870 to 1873 he studied at the University of Leipzig, where his influences included Friedrich Ritschl. In 1873 he received his doctorate with the dissertation De temporibus Ecclesiazuson Aristophanis, and following graduation, worked as a tutor in St. Petersburg. In 1877 he obtained his habilitation for classical philology at Leipzig, and two years later, became an associate professor at the University of Jena. From 1880 to 1924 he was a full professor of classical philology at Jena, serving as university rector on three separate occasions (1890/91, 1902 and 1910/11).

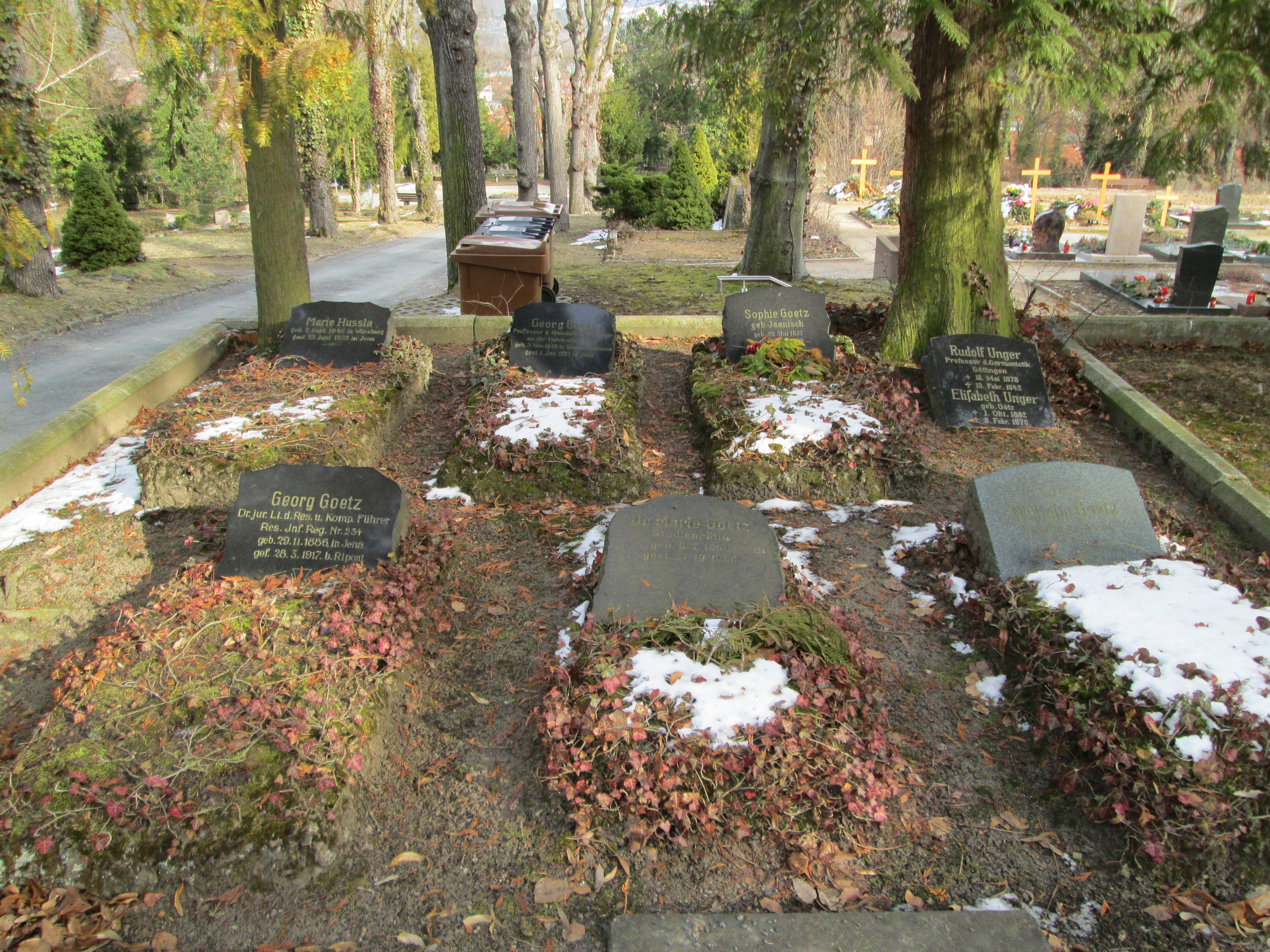
Gravesite of Georg Goetz at the Nordfriedhof in Jena

== Published works ==
He was co-editor of a four volume work on the comedies of Plautus (T. Macci Plauti Comoediae), and made major contributions to the Corpus glossariorum Latinorum and to Pauly's Realencyclopädie der classischen Altertumswissenschaft. Other principal written works by Goetz include:

- Dittographien im Plautustexte nebst methodischen Folgerungen. Eine kritische Untersuchung. In: Acta societatis philologae Lipsiensis. Band 6 (1877), S. 233–328 – Dittography in Plautine text together with methodological implications. A critical examination.
- Analecta Plautina. Leipzig 1877 (with Fritz Schöll and Gustav Löwe).
- Glossarium Terentianum ex recensione. Jena 1885.
- De Astrabae Plautinae fragmentis commentatio. Jena 1893.
- M. Terenti Varronis rerum rusticarum libri tres, post Henricum Keil iterum, 1912 (post Heinrich Keil; edition of Marcus Terentius Varro).
- M. Porci Catonis De agri cultura liber, 1922 (edition of Marcus Porcius Cato).
