= Schull (disambiguation) =

Schull is a city in Ireland.

Schull may also refer to:

- Schull and Skibbereen Railway
- Schull railway station

== People with the surname ==
- Amanda Schull, American ballet dancer
- Belinda Schüll, Mexican singer, songwriter, and actress
- Joseph Schull, Canadian playwright and historian
- Rebecca Schull, American actor
- Richard Schull, American actor

== See also ==
- Scholl
- Schuller
