= Erwin Rohde =

German classical philologist (1845–1898)

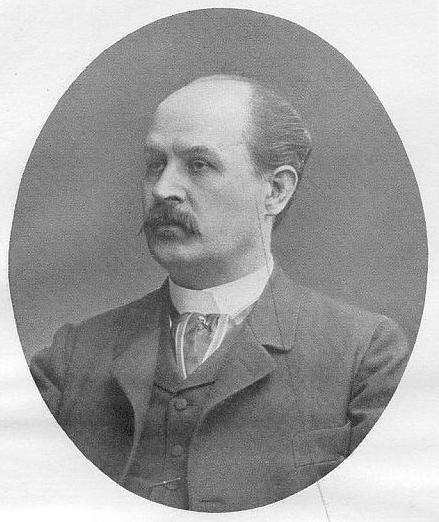
Erwin Rohde

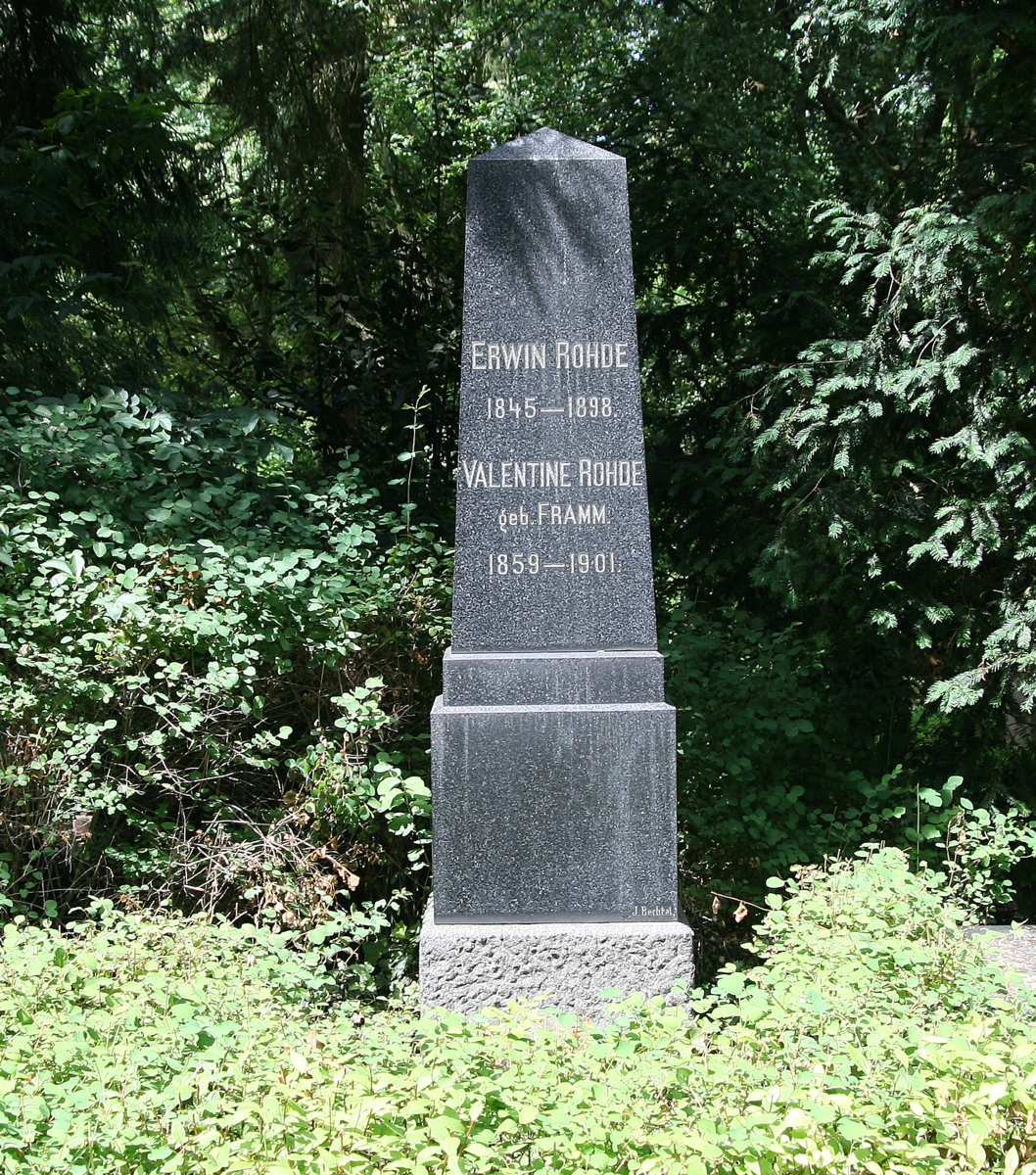
Grave in Heidelberg

Erwin Rohde (German: [ˈɛʁvɪn ˈʁoːdə]; 9 October 1845 – 11 January 1898) was one of the great German classical scholars of the 19th century.

Rohde was born in Hamburg and was the son of a doctor. Outside of antiquarian circles, Rohde is known today chiefly for his friendship and correspondence with fellow philologist Friedrich Nietzsche. The two were students together in Bonn and Leipzig, where they were studying philology taught by Friedrich Wilhelm Ritschl. In 1872, Rohde became a professor at the University of Kiel. He later was professor in Jena (1876), Tübingen (1878) and finally Heidelberg, where he died in 1898 after suffering from a gradual decline in health.

His Psyche (1890-1894) remains a standard reference work for Greek cult practices and beliefs related to the soul.

His work, Der Griechische Roman und seine Vorläufer (1876), was considered by Mikhail Bakhtin to be "the best book on the history of the ancient novel", and it is still regarded as one of the greatest "monuments of 19th century classics scholarship in Germany".

== Bibliography ==
- Psyche: The Cult of Souls and the Belief in Immortality among the Greeks, trans. from the 8th edn. by W. B. Hillis (London: Routledge & Kegan Paul, 1925; archive.org, reprinted by Routledge, 2000), limited preview online; full text at Project Gutenberg online.
