= Curt Wachsmuth =

German historian and classical philologist

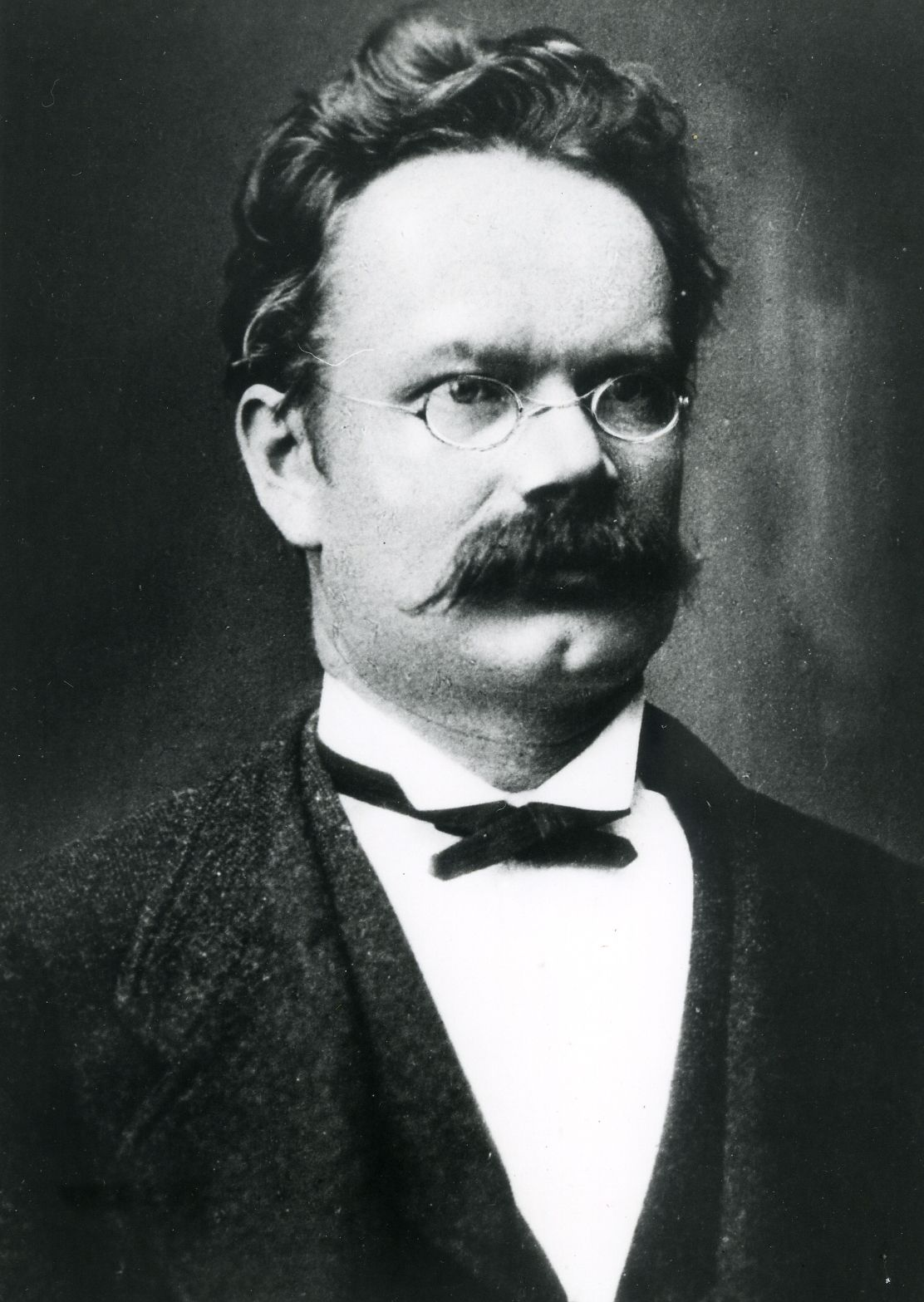
- Curt Wachsmuth (1884)
- Born: 27 April 1837; Naumburg an der Saale
- Died: 8 June 1905 (aged 68)
- Education: University of Jena; University of Bonn
- Occupations: historian and classical philologist
- Known for: professor at Universities of Göttingen, Heidelberg, Leipzig
- Notable work: Anthologium
- Relatives: Friedrich Ritschl (father-in-law)

Curt Wachsmuth (27 April 1837 in Naumburg an der Saale – 8 June 1905 in Leipzig) was a German historian and classical philologist. He was a son-in-law to philologist Friedrich Ritschl, brother of the educator Richard Wachsmuth and father of the physicist Richard Wachsmuth.

== Academic biography ==
From 1856 to 1860 he studied at the universities of Jena and Bonn, where he later received his habilitation in classical philology and ancient history. In 1864 he became a professor in ancient history at the University of Marburg, followed by professorships in classical philology at the universities of Göttingen (1869–1877) and Heidelberg (1877–1885). From 1885 to 1905 he was a professor of classical philology and ancient history at the University of Leipzig. In 1897/98 he served as university rector.

== Published works ==
Among his better written efforts were a two volume work on ancient Athens (1874, 1890), an introduction to the study of ancient history (1895) and with Otto Hense, a five volume edition of Stobaeus' Anthologium.

- De Cratete Mallota disputavit adiectis eius reliquiis, Leipzig 1860 (S. 1-36 appeared as dissertation)
- Die Stadt Athen im Altertum, 2 volumes, Leipzig 1874, 1890 – The city of Athens in antiquity
- Studien zu den griechischen Florilegien, 1882 – Studies of Greek florilegia
- Ioannis Stobaei Anthologium (with Otto Hense), 5 volumes. 1884–1912 – edition of Stobaeus
- Sillographorum Graecorum reliquiae. Praecedit commentatio de Timone Phliasio ceterisque sillographis, Leipzig 1885
- Neue Beiträge zur Topographie von Athen, 1887 – New contributions on the topography of Athens
- Einleitung in das Studium der alten Geschichte, Leipzig 1895 – Introduction to the study of ancient history
- Ioannis Laurentii Lydi Liber de Ostentis et Calendaria graeca omnia, 1897 – edition of John the Lydian
