= Carl Friedrich Wilhelm Alfred Fleckeisen =

German philologist and critic

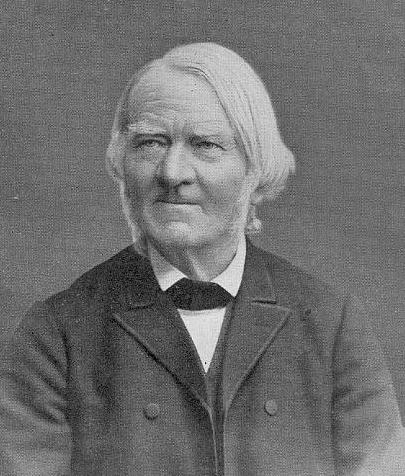
Carl Friedrich Wilhelm Alfred Fleckeisen

Carl Friedrich Wilhelm Alfred Fleckeisen (September 23, 1820, in Wolfenbüttel – August 7, 1899, in Dresden) was a German philologist and critic. He is best known for his work on Plautus and Terence.

He was educated at the Helmstedt gymnasium and the University of Göttingen. After holding several educational posts at Frankfurt am Main and Dresden, in 1861 he was appointed in the vice-principalship of the Vitzthum-Gymnasium at Dresden, which he held until his retirement in 1889. Fleckeisen is chiefly known for his labors on Plautus and Terence; in the knowledge of these authors he was unrivalled, except perhaps by Ritschl, his lifelong friend and a worker in the same field.

His chief works are: Exercitationes Plautinae (1842), one of the most masterly productions on the language of Plautus; Analecta Plautina, printed in Philologus (1847); Plauti Comoediae (Vols. I and II, 1850-1851, unfinished), introduced by an "Epistula critica ad F. Ritschelium"; P. Terenti Afri Comoediae (new ed., 1898). In his editions he endeavoured to restore the text in accordance with the results of his researches on the usages of the Latin language and meter. He attached great importance to the question of orthography, and his short treatise Fünfzig Artikel (1861) is considered most valuable. Fleckeisen also contributed largely to the Jahrbücher für Philologie und Pädagogik, the philology department of which he was for many years editor.
