= Gustav Löwe =

German classical philologist and librarian

Carl Gustav Löwe (18 February 1852 in Grimma – 16 December 1883 in Göttingen) was a German classical philologist and librarian.

He studied classical philology at the University of Leipzig as a pupil of Friedrich Ritschl. From 1875 he carried out Plautine research in Italy, and in 1878 traveled to Spain in order to prepare materials for the Bibliotheca patrum latinorum on behalf of the Austrian Academy of Sciences. In 1879 he returned to Leipzig, and during the following year, moved to Göttingen, where he served as curator of the university library. He died on 16 December 1883 (age 31) due to consequences of a falling accident.

== Published works ==
- Quaestionum de glossariorum Latinorum fontibus et usu particula commentatio, 1875.
- Prodromus corporis glossariorum Latinorum: Quaestiones de glossariorum Latinorum fontibus et usu, 1876.
- Analecta Plautina (with Georg Goetz, Fritz Schöll, 1877).
- Exempla scripturae visigoticae 40 tabulis expressa (with Paul Ewald, 1883).
- Glossae nominum (edited by Georg Goetz, 1884).
- Bibliotheca patrum latinorum hispaniensis, (edited by Wilhelm von Hartel, 1887).

He also made contributions as an editor to T. Macci Plauti Comoediae recensuit instrumento critico et prolegomenis (comedies of Plautus) and the Corpus glossariorum Latinorum.
