= Stobaeus =

5th-century Greek anthologist

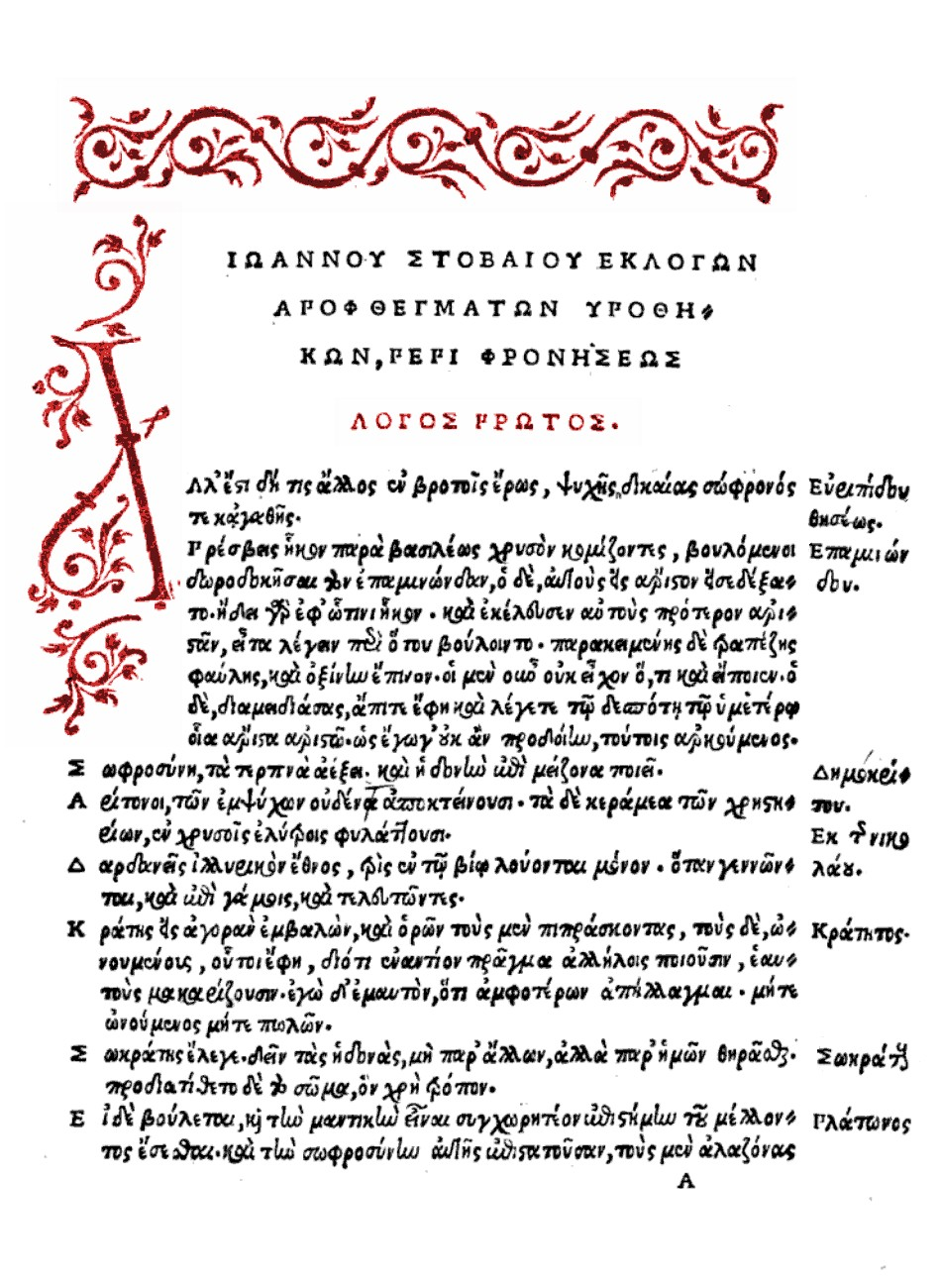
Page one of the Florilegium of Stobaeus, from the 1536 edition by Vettore Trincavelli.

Joannes Stobaeus (/dʒoʊˈænɪs stoʊˈbiːəs/; Ancient Greek: Ἰωάννης ὁ Στοβαῖος; fl. 5th-century AD), from Stobi in Macedonia, was the compiler of a valuable series of extracts from Greek authors. The work was originally divided into two volumes containing two books each. The two volumes became separated in the manuscript tradition, and the first volume became known as the Extracts (also Eclogues) and the second volume became known as the Anthology (also Florilegium). Modern editions now refer to both volumes as the Anthology. The Anthology contains extracts from hundreds of writers, especially poets, historians, orators, philosophers and physicians. The subjects range from natural philosophy, dialectics, and ethics, to politics, economics, and maxims of practical wisdom. The work preserves fragments of many authors and works which otherwise might be unknown today.

== Life ==
Nothing of his life is known. The age in which he lived cannot be fixed with accuracy. He quotes no writer later than the early 5th century, and he probably lived around this time. His surname apparently indicates that he was a native of Stobi capital of Macedonia Secunda, while his given name, John, would probably indicate that he was a Christian, or at least the son of Christian parents, However, from his silence in regard to Christian authors, it has also been inferred that he was not a Christian.

== Work ==
Stobaeus' anthology is a collection of extracts from earlier Greek writers, which he collected and arranged, in the order of subjects, as a repertory of valuable and instructive sayings. The extracts were intended by Stobaeus for his son Septimius, and were preceded by a letter briefly explaining the purpose of the work and giving a summary of the contents. The full title, according to Photius, was Four Books of Extracts, Sayings and Precepts (Ἐκλογῶν, ἀποφθεγμάτων, ὑποθηκῶν βιβλία τέσσαρα [Eklogon, apophthegmaton, hypothekon biblia tessara]). He quoted more than five hundred writers, generally beginning with the poets, and then proceeding to the historians, orators, philosophers, and physicians. The works of the greater part of these have perished. It is to him that we owe many of our most important fragments of the dramatists. He has quoted over 500 passages from Euripides, 150 from Sophocles, and over 200 from Menander. It is evident from this summary, preserved in Photius's Bibliotheca (9th century), that the work was originally divided into four books and two volumes, and that surviving manuscripts of the third book consist of two books which have been merged. He his also widely known for his collection of Hermetic teachings or work dedicated to Hermes Trismegistus.

At some time subsequent to Photius the two volumes were separated, and the two volumes became known to Latin Europe as the Eclogae and the Florilegium respectively. Modern editions have dropped these two titles and have reverted to calling the entire work the Anthology (Latin: Anthologium). In most of the manuscripts there is a division into three books, forming two distinct works; the first and second books forming one work under the title Physical and Moral Extracts (also Eclogues; Greek: Ἐκλογαὶ φυσικαὶ καὶ ἠθικαί), the third book forming another work, called Florilegium or Sermones (or Anthology; Ἀνθολόγιον). The introduction to the whole work, treating of the value of philosophy and of philosophical sects, is lost, with the exception of the concluding portion; the second book is little more than a fragment, and the third and fourth have been amalgamated by altering the original sections. Each chapter of the four books is headed by a title describing its matter.

=== Introduction ===
We learn from Photius that the first book was preceded by a dissertation on the advantages of philosophy, an account of the different schools of philosophy, and a collection of the opinions of ancient writers on geometry, music, and arithmetic. The greater part of this introduction is lost. The close of it only, where arithmetic is spoken of, is still extant.

=== Eclogues ===
The first two books consist for the most part of extracts conveying the views of earlier poets and prose writers on points of physics, dialectics, and ethics. The first book was divided into sixty chapters, the second into forty-six, of which the manuscripts preserve only the first nine. Some of the missing parts of the second book (chapters 15, 31, 33, and 46) have, however, been recovered from a 14th-century gnomology.

His knowledge of physics — in the wide sense which the Greeks assigned to this term — is often untrustworthy. Stobaeus betrays a tendency to confound the dogmas of the early Ionian philosophers, and he occasionally mixes up Platonism with Pythagoreanism. For part of the first book and much of the second, it is clear that he depended on the (lost) works of the Peripatetic philosopher Aetius and the Stoic philosopher Arius Didymus.

=== Florilegium ===
The third and fourth books are an anthology devoted to subjects of a moral, political, and economic kind, and maxims of practical wisdom. The third book originally consisted of forty-two chapters, and the fourth of fifty-eight. These two books, like the larger part of the second, treat of ethics; the third, of virtues and vices, in pairs; the fourth, of more general ethical and political subjects, frequently citing extracts to illustrate the pros and cons of a question in two successive chapters.

== Editions ==
The first edition of books 1 and 2 was that by G. Canter (Antwerp, 1575). There were subsequent editions made by A. H. L. Heeren (Göttingen, 1792–1801, in 4 vols. 8vo.), and Thomas Gaisford (Oxford, 1850). The first edition of books 3 and 4 was that edited by Trincavelli (Venice, 4to. 1536). Three editions were published by Conrad Gessner (Zurich, 1543; Basle, 1549; Zurich; 1559), and another by Gaisford (Oxford, 1822, 4 vols. 8vo.). The first edition of the whole of Stobaeus together was one published at Geneva in 1609. The next major edition of the whole corpus was that by Augustus Meineke (Leipzig, 1855–1864). The modern edition is that by Curt Wachsmuth and Otto Hense (Berlin, 1884–1912, 5 volumes). Wachsmuth and Hense's edition attempts, as far as possible, to restore the text of the Anthology as it was written by Stobaeus.

- Thomas Gaisford (1822–1824), Iōannou Stobaiou Anthologion – Ioannis Stobæi Florilegium, Volume 1, Iōannou Stobaiou Anthologion – Ioannis Stobæi Florilegium, Volume 2, Ioannis Stobaei Florilegium, ad manuscriptorum fidem emendavit et supplevit Thomas Gaisford, Volume 3, Ioannis Stobaei Florilegium, ad manuscriptorum fidem emendavit et supplevit Thomas Gaisford, Volume 4 Oxford: Clarendon,
- August Meineke (1855), Florilegium Vol 1–2 (1855), Vol 3–4 (1856), Eclogues Vol 1 (1860), Ioannis Stobaei Eclogarum Physicarum et Ethicarum, Vol 2 (1864), Leipzig: B. G. Teubner.
- Curtius Wachsmuth, Otto Hense, Eclogues Volumes 1–2 (1884), Florilegium Vol 1 (1894), Vol 2 (1909), Vol 3 (1912), Appendix (1923), Berlin: Weidmannsche Buchhandlung.

=== Translations ===
The entire work has not been translated into any modern language. However, many of the individual authors have been collected and translated separately as part of collections of those authors' fragments.

- Hermetica:Litwa, M. David, ed. (2018). Hermetica II: The Excerpts of Stobaeus, Papyrus Fragments, and Ancient Testimonies in an English Translation with Notes and Introductions. Cambridge: Cambridge University Press. doi:10.1017/9781316856567. ISBN 978-1-107-18253-0. S2CID 217372464.
- Romm, James (2026). Since You're Mortal . . .: Life Lessons from the Lost Greek Plays. W. W. Norton & Company. ISBN 978-1-324-08608-6.
