= Richard Wachsmuth (physicist) =

German physicist (1868–1941)

Friedrich Bruno Richard Wachsmuth (21 March 1868 - 1 January 1941) was a German physicist and academic.

== Life ==
Born in Marburg, he came from an academic family - his maternal grandfather Friedrich Ritschl and his father Curt were both philologists. He received his abitur from the Leipzig Thomasschule in 1887 and then studied physics at the universities of Heidelberg, the Berlin - where he was the last assistant to Hermann von Helmholtz, later a friend - and the Leipzig. He graduated in November 1892 with a doctoral thesis on experiments in internal heat conduction and the following year gained his first job at the Physical-Technical Reich Institute (Physikalisch-Technische Reichsanstalt).

In 1896 he became an assistant at the Georg-August-Universität Göttingen and in September the same year married in Berlin, having their first child Anna Sabine the following year in Göttingen, followed on 29 March 1900 by Werner, a future surgeon, and in 1903 Ernst. In the meantime, in 1898, Richard habilitated at Göttingen and from then until 1905 he taught as extraordinary professor of physics at the University of Rostock.

After an interlude at the Prussian War Academy in Berlin, Wachsmuth became a lecturer at Frankfurt am Main's Physics Society (Physikalische Verein) in 1907, alongside a part-time lectureship at the same city's Academy for the Social Sciences and Commercial Sciences (one of the predecessors of the University of Frankfurt). In 1908 he was made one of the Academy's professors for experimental physics and in 1913-1914 served as its last rector. The Wachsmuth's family home in Frankfurt was at 83 Grillparzerstraße.

From 1911 he and the city's mayor Franz Adickes played a major role in the University's foundation, probably one of the reasons Wachsmuth as appointed its first rector on 16 August 1914 by the Prussian Culture Minister. In 1914 he also worked as physics teacher at the Lessing-Gymnasium in Frankfurt and that year also saw him begin an eighteen-year stint as full professor of experimental physics and director, both at Frankfurt's Physics Institute.

From 1914 he no longer took an active part in the paradigm shift in physics brought about by the theories of relativity and quantum mechanics, though it was at the Institute that Otto Stern and Wachsmuth's chief assistant Walther Gerlach carried out the Stern–Gerlach experiment, one of the milestones in quantum theory. He did, however, work on early radio technology and gave the opening speech at Frankfurt's Radio Day in April 1924.

From 1915 he was a board member of Frankfurt's Polytechnic Society and served as its president from 1932 to 1936 - his son Werner argues Richard left the post after the Nazi regime attempted to force the Society into line with its policies. He was made an honorary senator of the University in 1939 and died two years later in Icking near Munich, to which he and his wife had retired, being cremated at Munich's crematorium.

== Bibliography ==
- (in German) Walther G. Saltzer: Richard Wachsmuth. In: K. Bethge, H. Klein (ed.): Geschichte der Johann-Wolfgang-Goethe-Universität, Frankfurt am Main: Physiker und Astronomen in Frankfurt / hrsg. im Auftr. d. Fachbereichs Physik. Metzner, Neuwied 1989, ISBN 3-472-00031-7

== External links (in German) ==
- Literature by and about Richard Wachsmuth (physicist) in the German National Library catalogue
- Literature about Richard Wachsmuth (physicist) in the State Bibliography (Landesbibliographie) of Mecklenburg-Vorpommern
- Richard Wachsmuth (Memento vom 29. April 2013 im Webarchiv archive.today) an der Universität Frankfurt
- Wachsmuth's entry in the Catalogus Professorum Rostochiensium
