= Christian Karl Reisig =

German philologist and linguist

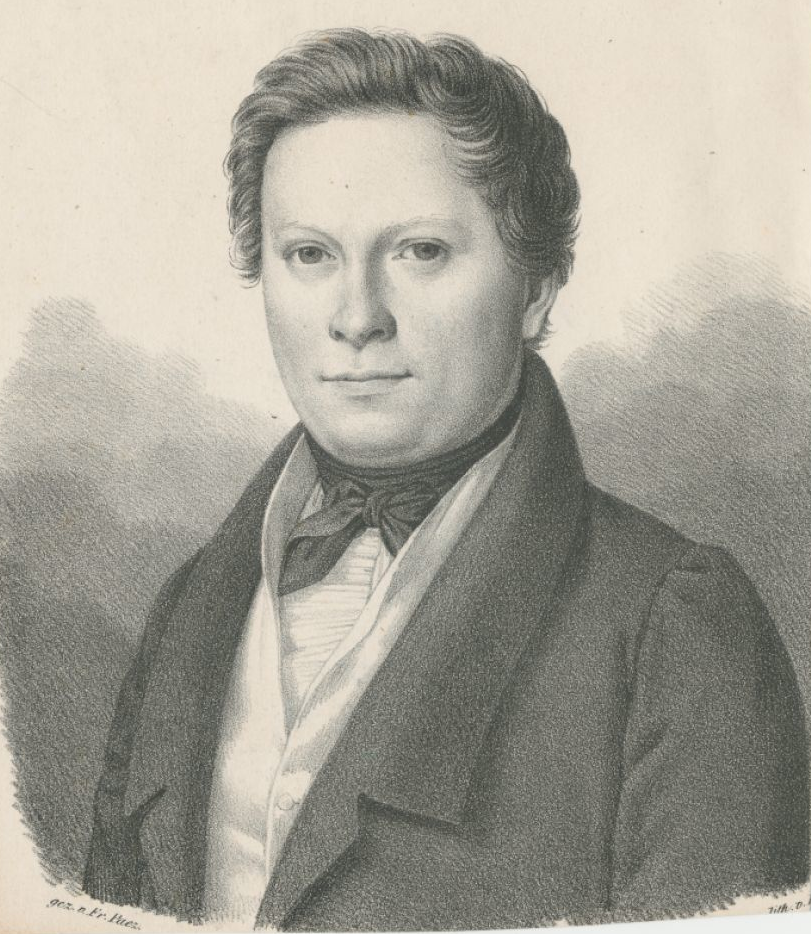

Christian Karl Reisig (name sometimes given as Karl Christian Reisig; 17 November 1792 – 17 January 1829) was a German philologist and linguist who was a native of Weißensee.

Reisig studied philology under Gottfried Hermann (1772–1848) at the University of Leipzig, afterwards furthering his studies at Göttingen (1812). From 1813 to 1815 he was a soldier in the Napoleonic Wars, afterwards working as a lecturer at the University of Jena. In 1820 he relocated to the University of Halle as an associate professor, where in 1824 he became a full professor. Two of his better known students were Friedrich Wilhelm Ritschl (1806–1876) and Friedrich Haase (1808–1867), the latter having published an edition of Reisig's Vorlesungen über lateinische Sprachwissenschaft (Latin Lectures on Linguistics) in 1839. Reisig died on 17 January 1829 in Venice at the age of 36.

Reisig was a classical philologist who is credited with developing a new branch of linguistics known as "semasiology". He introduced this new discipline because he felt that the study of word-meaning could not be adequately met within the constraints of etymology or syntax. He felt that semasiology would properly show the development of word-meanings in a logical and historical sense.
