= Rudolf Schöll =

German classical philologist (1844–1893)

Rudolf Schöll (1 September 1844, Weimar, Germany – 10 June 1893, Munich, Germany) was a German classical scholar. He specialized in the fields of Greek and Roman legal history, classical archaeology and Greek epigraphy.

He received his education at the University of Göttingen as a student of Hermann Sauppe and Ernst Curtius, followed by studies at the University of Bonn, where his instructors included Friedrich Ritschl and Otto Jahn. In 1865, he obtained his doctorate of philosophy. Later on, he worked in Italy and Greece (1867–1870), first as an aide to Theodor Mommsen in the development of inscriptions and manuscripts, afterward as a private secretary to Guido von Usedom, the Prussian ambassador to the Italian government in Florence.

In 1871, he received his habilitation in classical philology, becoming an associate professor during the following year at the University of Greifswald. In 1874, he was named successor to Conrad Bursian at the University of Jena, and in 1875 relocated to the University of Strasbourg as a replacement for Ulrich Köhler. In 1885, he again replaced Bursian, this time as a professor at the Ludwig-Maximilians-Universität München.

Throughout his lifetime he cultivated relationships with luminaries that included Prince Friedrich Wilhelm of Prussia, writer Paul Heyse, composer Franz Liszt and painter Franz von Lenbach.

== Written works ==
- "Quaestiones juris fiscales Attici", Berlin 1873.
- "De synegoris Atticis Commentatio", Jena 1875, (with Fritz Schöll).
- "Q. Asconii Pediani orationum Ciceronianarum quinque Enarratio", Berlin 1875, (with Adolf Kiessling).
- "Satura philologica: H. Sauppio obtulit amicorum conlegarum Decas", Berlin 1879 (initiated by Schöll).
- "Iustiniani Novellae", five books, Leipzig 1880-1895 (completed by Wilhelm Kroll).
- "Anecdota varia Graeca musica metrica grammatical" (with Wilhelm Studemund, 1886).
- "Procli commentariorum in rempublicam Platonis partes ineditae", Berlin 1886 (edition of the comments by Proclus on Plato's "Politeia").
