= Friedrich Wilhelm Ritschl =

German classical philologist (1806–1876)

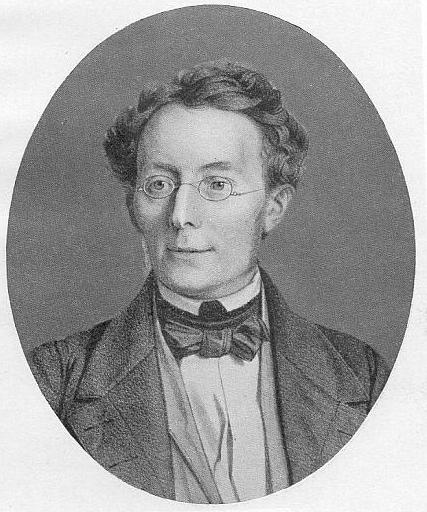
Friedrich Wilhelm Ritschl

Friedrich Wilhelm Ritschl (German: [ˈʁɪtʃl̩]; 6 April 1806 – 9 November 1876) was a German scholar best known for his studies of Plautus.

== Biography ==
Ritschl was born in Großvargula, Prussia. His family, in which culture and poverty were hereditary, were Protestants who had migrated several generations earlier from Bohemia. Ritschl was fortunate in his school training, at a time when the great reform in the higher schools of Prussia had not yet been thoroughly carried out. His chief teacher, Spitzner, a pupil of Gottfried Hermann, divined the boy's genius and allowed it free growth, applying only so much either of stimulus or of restraint as was absolutely needful. After a wasted year at the University of Leipzig, where Hermann stood at the zenith of his fame, Ritschl passed in 1826 to Halle.

Here he came under the powerful influence of Christian Karl Reisig, a young Hermannianer with exceptional talent, a fascinating personality and a rare gift for instilling into his pupils his own ardour for classical study. The great controversy between the Realists and the Verbalists was then at its height, and Ritschl naturally sided with Hermann against August Böckh. The early death of Reisig in 1828 did not sever Ritschl from Halle, where he began his professorial career with a great reputation and brilliant success, but soon hearers fell away, and the pinch of poverty compelled his removal to Breslau, where he reached the rank of ordinary professor in 1834, and held other offices.

The great event of Ritschl's life was a sojourn of nearly a year in Italy (1836–37), spent in libraries and museums, and more particularly in the laborious examination of the Ambrosian palimpsest of Plautus in Milan. The remainder of his life was largely occupied in working out the material then gathered and the ideas then conceived. Bonn, where he moved on his marriage in 1839, and where he remained for twenty-six years, was the great scene of his activity both as scholar and as teacher.

The philological seminary which he controlled, although nominally only joint-director with Welcker, became a veritable officina litterarum, a kind of Isocratean school of classical study; in it were trained many of the foremost scholars of the late 19th century. The names of G. Curtius, Ihne, Schleicher, Bernays, Ribbeck, Lorenz, Vahlen, Hübner, Bücheler, Helbig, Benndorf, Riese, Windisch, and Nietzsche, who were his pupils either at Bonn or at Leipzig, attest his fame and power as a teacher. In 1854 Otto Jahn took the place of the venerable Welcker at Bonn, and after a time succeeded in dividing with Ritschl the empire over the philological school there. The two had been friends, but after gradual estrangement a violent dispute arose between them in 1865, which for many months divided into two hostile forces the universities and the press of Germany. Both sides were steeped in fault, but Ritschl undoubtedly received harsh treatment from the Prussian government, and pressed his resignation. He accepted a call to Leipzig, where he died in harness in 1876. Ritschl was elected a Foreign Honorary Member of the American Academy of Arts and Sciences in 1868.

== Character ==
Ritschl's character was strongly marked. The spirited element in him was powerful, and to some at times he seemed overbearing, but his nature was noble at the core; and, though intolerant of inefficiency and stupidity, he never asserted his personal claims in any mean or petty way. He was warmly attached to family and friends, and yearned continually after sympathy, yet he established real intimacy with only a few. He had a great faculty for organization, as is shown by his administration of the university library at Bonn, and by the eight years of labour which carried to success a work of infinite complexity, the famous Priscae Latinitatis Monumenta Epigraphica (Bonn, 1862). This volume presents in admirable facsimile, with prefatory notices and indexes, the Latin inscriptions from the earliest times to the end of the Republic. It forms an introductory volume to the Berlin Corpus Inscriptionum Latinarum, the excellence of which is largely due to the precept and example of Ritschl, though he had no hand in the later volumes. The results of Ritschl's life are mainly gathered up in a long series of monographs, for the most part of the highest finish, and rich in ideas which leavened the scholarship of the time.

== Scholarship ==
As a scholar, Ritschl was of the lineage of Bentley, to whom he looked up, like Hermann, with fervent admiration. His best efforts were spent in studying the languages and literatures of Greece and Rome, rather than the life of the Greeks and Romans. He was sometimes, but most unjustly, charged with taking a narrow view of philology. That he keenly appreciated the importance of ancient institutions and ancient art both his published papers and the records of his lectures amply testify. He devoted himself for the most part to the study of ancient poetry, and in particular of the early Latin drama. This formed the centre from which his investigations radiated. Starting from this he ranged over the whole remains of pre-Ciceronian Latin, and not only analysed but augmented the sources from which our knowledge of it must come. Before Ritschl the acquaintance of scholars with early Latin was so dim and restricted that it would perhaps be hardly an exaggeration to call him its real discoverer.

== Plautus ==
To the world in general Ritschl was best known as a student of Plautus. He cleared away the accretions of ages, and by efforts of that real genius which goes hand in hand with labor, brought to light many of the true features of the original. It is infinitely to be regretted that Ritschl's results were never combined to form that monumental edition of Plautus of which he dreamed in his earlier life. Ritschl's examination of the Plautine manuscripts was both laborious and brilliant, and greatly extended the knowledge of Plautus and of the ancient Latin drama. Of this, two striking examples may be cited. By the aid of the Ambrosian palimpsest he recovered the name T Maccius Plautus, for the vulgate M Accius, and proved it correct by strong, extraneous arguments. On the margin of the Palatine manuscripts the marks "C" and "DV" continually recur, and had been variously explained. Ritschl proved that they meant Canticum and Diverbium, and hence showed that in the Roman comedy only the conversations in iambic senarii were not intended for the singing voice. Thus was brought into strong relief a fact without which there can be no true appreciation of Plautus, viz., that his plays were comic operas rather than comic dramas.

In conjectural criticism Ritschl was inferior not only to his great predecessors but to some of his contemporaries. His imagination was in this field (but in this field only) hampered by erudition, and his judgment was unconsciously warped by the desire to find in his text illustrations of his discoveries. But still a fair proportion of his textual labours has stood the test of time, and he rendered immense service by his study of Plautine metres, a field in which little advance had been made since the time of Bentley. In this matter Ritschl was aided by an accomplishment rare (as he himself lamented) in Germany, the art of writing Latin verse.

In spite of the incompleteness, on many sides, of his work, Ritschl must be assigned a place in the history of learning among a very select few. His studies are presented principally in his Opuscula collected partly before and partly since his death. The Trinummus (twice edited) was the only specimen of his contemplated edition of Plautus which he completed. The edition has been continued by some of his pupils—Georg Goetz, Gustav Loewe, and others.

== Recommendation of Nietzsche ==
Ritschl recommended that his student, Friedrich Nietzsche, be considered for the position of professor at the University of Basel. He described Nietzsche in the following words.

However many young talents I have seen develop under my eyes for thirty-nine years now, never yet have I known a young man, or tried to help one along in my field as best I could, who was so mature as early and as young as this Nietzsche. His Museum articles he wrote in the second and third year of his triennium. He is the first from whom I have ever accepted any contribution at all while he was still a student. If — God grant — he lives long enough, I prophesy that he will one day stand in the front rank of German philology. He is now twenty-four years old: strong, vigorous, healthy, courageous physically and morally, so constituted as to impress those of a similar nature. On top of that, he possesses the enviable gift of presenting ideas, talking freely, as calmly as he speaks skillfully and clearly. He is the idol and, without wishing it, the leader of the whole younger generation of philologists here in Leipzig who — and they are rather numerous — cannot wait to hear him as a lecturer. You will say, I describe a phenomenon. Well, that is just what he is — and at the same time pleasant and modest. Also a gifted musician, which is irrelevant here. ... Nietzsche is not at all a specifically political nature. He may have in general, on the whole, some sympathy for the growing greatness of Germany, but, like myself, no special tendre [fondness] for Prussianism; yet he has vivid feeling for free civic and spiritual development, and thus certainly a heart for your Swiss institutions and way of living. What more am I to say? His studies so far have been weighted toward the history of Greek literature (of course, including critical and exegetical treatment of the authors), with special emphasis, it seems to me, on the history of Greek philosophy. But I have not the least doubt that, if confronted by a practical demand, with his great gifts he will work in other fields with the best of success. He will simply be able to do anything he wants to do.

Walter Kaufmann described the unusual situation as follows. "But Nietzsche had not yet fulfilled his residence requirement and hence had no doctorate. So Ritschl expected the case to be hopeless, 'although in the present instance,' he wrote, 'I should stake my whole philological and academic reputation that the matter would work out happily.' It is hardly surprising that Basel decided to ignore the 'formal insufficiency.' Ritschl was delighted: 'In Germany, that sort of thing happens absolutely never.'."

Nietzsche was beginning to lose interest in philology at the time, due to his intense interests in science, Wagner's music, and Schopenhauer's philosophy. Kaufmann continued: "His call to the university of Basel came as a surprise to Nietzsche, who had not yet received his doctorate though he had published some fruits of his research in a scholarly journal. He had actually considered giving up philology for science when, on Ritschl's recommendation, he was appointed a professor of classical philology at Basel, and Leipzig hurriedly conferred the doctorate without examination."

Nietzsche's consuming interest in philosophy, however, soon overcame his work in philology. His first published book, The Birth of Tragedy, effectively ended his career as professor. "Ritschl dismissed the book as geistreiche Schwiemelei, 'brilliant babbling.' " Enrollment in Nietzsche's classes briefly suffered in the wake of the book's poor reception by Classics professionals generally. He retired due to migraines and other physical disabilities at the age of thirty-five. Ritschl's prophecy had been the direct opposite of the course of events.

== Other works ==
- An interesting and discriminating estimate of Ritschl's work is that by Lucian Müller (Berlin, 1877).
- Carl Schurz, Reminiscences (3 vols.), New York: McClure Publ. Co., 1907. In Vol. One, Chap. 5, pp. 126–7, Schurz recalls a meeting, in the wake and the midst of the events of 1848, of university students at the University of Bonn where Ritschl was the chair. Schurz gave an impromptu speech which was well received, and after the adjournment Ritschl met him and asked his age and was disappointed that at nineteen Schurz was still too young to be a member of the planned parliament.
- An account of Ritschl's life is given in: Gildersleeve, Basil L. (1884). "Friedrich Ritschl". The American Journal of Philology, Vol. 5, No. 3 (1884), pp. 339–355.

== See also ==
- Carl Friedrich Wilhelm Alfred Fleckeisen
- Albrecht Ritschl (his first cousin)

== Notes ==
Attribution
