= Thomas Duve =

German legal historian (born 1967)

Thomas Duve (born April 24, 1967) is a German jurist and historian. He is a law professor at Goethe University Frankfurt and director of the Max Planck Institute for Legal History and Legal Theory of the Max Planck Society since 2009.

== Biography ==
Duve studied law and philosophy at Heidelberg University, Pontifical Catholic University of Argentina, LMU Munich and Munich School of Philosophy. He passed his Staatsexamen in 1994 and finished his doctoral thesis at LMU Munich, titled Normativität und Empirie im öffentlichen Recht und der Politikwissenschaft um 1900. Historisch-systematische Untersuchung des Lebens und Werks von Richard Schmidt (1862–1944) und der Methodenentwicklung seiner Zeit. His Doktorvater was the legal historian and canonist Peter Landau.

Duve habilitated at LMU Munich in 2004/2005. He received veniae legendi for civil law, German legal history, historical comparative law, philosophy of law and canon law. The habilitation thesis Sonderrecht in der Frühen Neuzeit. Das frühneuzeitliche ius singulare, untersucht anhand der privilegia miserabilium personarum, senum und indorum in Alter und Neuer Welt was published in 2008.

At the UCA in Buenos Aires, Duve was Professor of Legal History from 2005 to 2009. He has also been vice-director of the Institute for the History of Indian Canon Law since 2006 and associate professor of the Faculty of Canon Law at the UCA until 2009. That same year, he was appointed Director of the Max Planck Institute for European Legal History of the Max Planck Society in Frankfurt. Simultaneously he became a professor for Comparative Legal History at Goethe University Frankfurt.

He also served as the executive chair of the LOEWE focus on „Außergerichtliche und gerichtliche Konfliktlösung“ (Extrajudicial and Judicial Conflict Resolution), an interdisciplinary collaborative research project within the framework of the Hessian Excellence Programme, from 2012 to 2014.

Duve is among others a Member of the advisory board of Iuris Canonici Medii Aevi Consociatio (ICMAC) and of the Stephan-Kuttner-Institute of Medieval Canaon Law. He is also an academic Member of Academia Europaea, Max Planck Society, Akademie der Wissenschaften und der Literatur, National Academy of History of Argentina, Instituto de Investigaciones de Historia del Derecho and Instituto Internacional de Historia del Derecho Indiano.

In 2023, he was appointed honorary professor at the Chinese University of Political Science and Law (CUPL) in Beijing.

He is a (co-)editor of several publication series and journals, including the *Max Planck Studies in Global Legal History of the Iberian Worlds* (Brill), the series China – Normen, Ideen, Praktiken (campus), the blog Legal History Insights, and a member of various scholarly associations, academies, and research networks (see full CV).

== Research ==
Duve became director at the Max Planck Institute for European Legal History in 2009, taking over from Michael Stolleis. Until the end of 2021, he led the Institute as executive director, which meant that he was also responsible for the entire Institute. His successor as executive director was the newly appointed Marietta Auer, who joined the Institute in 2021. Under Duve, the name of the Institute also changed to Max Planck Institute for Legal History and Theory, whereby the global perspective on legal history also became visible in the title.

His appointment as director of the Institute meant a complete reorientation of the research agenda, with the aim of placing European legal history in a broader context, both spatially and in terms of its subject matter. Research interests were expanded to include the territories and their encounters with the legal systems of Spain and Portugal since the early modern period. Duve thus permanently directed the investigations of European legal history towards a global perspective.

His focus is primarily on the legal history of the Iberian monarchies in the early modern period and the global historical perspective on European legal history. He is also interested in the history of ecclesiastical law and moral theology, especially the Salamanca School, as well as the methods of legal history.

== Publications (selection 2018-2026) ==
- Duve, Thomas, Historische Normativitätswissenschaft. Rechtshistorik jenseits der Moderne. Klostermann, 2026
- Duve, Thomas. "El Derecho canónico en la temprana Edad Moderna y la historia global." Ius Canonicum, vol. 65, no. 129, 2025, pp. 169-218, https://doi.org/10.15581/016.129.012
- Duve, Thomas, and Tamar Herzog (eds.). Historia del Derecho de América Latina en Perspectiva Global, Tirant Lo Blanch Valencia, 2024
- Duve, Thomas, and José Luis Egío García. Rechtsgeschichte des frühneuzeitlichen Hispanoamerika. De Gruyter Oldenbourg, 2023. (methodica, Tomo 6)
- Duve, Thomas. "História do direito como história do conhecimento normativo, lições de história do direito em África." Revista da Faculdade de Direito da Universidade Katyavala Bwila, no. 3, 2022, pp. 57-127
- Duve, Thomas. "História do direito na Alemanha: Tradições nacionais e perspectivas transnacionais = German Legal History: National Traditions and Transnational Perspectives." Cadernos Do Programa De Pós-Graduação Em Direito – PPGDir./UFRGS, vol. 16, no. 1, 2021, pp. 4-71
- Duve, Thomas. "Rechtsgeschichte als Geschichte von Normativitätswissen?" Rechtsgeschichte - Legal History Rg, vol. 29, 2021, pp. 41-68, http://dx.doi.org/10.12946/rg29/041-068
- Duve, Thomas. "A Escola de Salamanca: um caso de produção global de conhecimento = The School of Salamanca: A Case of Global Knowledge Production." Revista da Faculdade de Direito da UFRGS, no. 46, 2021, pp. 3-52
- Duve, Thomas, José Luis Egío García, and Christiane Birr, editors. The School of Salamanca: A Case of Global Knowledge Production. Brill Nijhoff, 2021
- Duve, Thomas. "What is Global Legal History?" Comparative Legal History, vol. 8, no. 2, 2020, pp. 73-115, https://doi.org/10.1080/2049677X.2020.1830488
- Duve, Thomas. "Wie schreibt man eine Geschichte der Globalisierung von Recht?" JuristenZeitung (JZ), vol. 75, no. 15-16, 2020, pp. 757-766
- Duve, Thomas, and Otto Danwerth (eds.). Knowledge of the Pragmatici: Legal and Moral Theological Literature and the Formation of Early Modern Ibero-America. Brill | Nijhoff, 2020. (Max-Planck Studies in Global Legal History of the Iberian Worlds, vol. 1)
- Duve, Thomas. "Literatura Normativa Pragmática e a Produção de Conhecimento Normativo nos Impérios Ibéricos do Início da Idade Moderna (Séculos XVI-XVII)." Revista da Faculdade de Direito da UFRGS, no. 42, 2020, pp. 3-44
- Duve, Thomas. "复规范性”从何谈起：法律全球化的知识挑战 [What is Multinormativity? Responding to the Intellectual Challenges of Legal Globalization]." Translated by Fupeng Li. Peking University Law Journal, vol. 31, no. 1, 2019, pp. 21-36. 托马斯•杜斐：《全球法律史导论》，李富鹏等译，高仰光校，“全球法律史丛书”第一册，商务印书馆2019年版 (An Introduction To Global Legal History, translated by Li Fupeng et al., Chinese Series of Global Legal History 1, Beijing: Commercial Press, 2019)
- Duve, Thomas. "Symposium: Legal History and Comparative Law: A Dialogue in Time of the Transnationalization of Law and Legal Scholarship - Preface." The American Journal of Comparative Law, vol. 66, no. 4, Dec. 2018, https://doi.org/10.1093/ajcl/avy042
- Duve, Thomas. "Indigenous Rights: Latin America." The Oxford Handbook of Legal History, edited by Markus Dubber and Christopher Tomlins, Oxford University Press, 2018, pp. 817-837
- Duve, Thomas. "'Tradições jurídicas' e história do direito." História do direito: entre rupturas, crises e descontinuidades, editado por A. Wehling, G. Siqueira e S. Barbosa, Arraes Editores, 2018, pp. 19-41
- Duve, Thomas. "Global Legal History: Setting Europe in Perspective." The Oxford Handbook of European Legal History, edited by Heikki Pihlajamäki, Markus Dubber, and Mark Godfrey, Oxford University Press, 2018, pp. 115-139, https://doi.org/10.1093/oxfordhb/9780198785521.013.5
- Duve, Thomas. "Legal Traditions: A Dialogue between Comparative Law and Comparative Legal History." Comparative Legal History, vol. 6, no. 1, 2018, https://doi.org/10.1080/2049677X.2018.1469271
- Duve, Thomas, and Stefan Ruppert (eds.). Rechtswissenschaft in der Berliner Republik. Suhrkamp, 2018, pp. 67-120
