= Ruth Macrides =

Classicist and researcher of Byzantine, Ottoman and Greek studies

Ruth Juliana Macrides
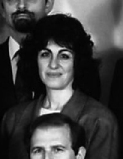
- Macrides in 1992
- Born: 1 October 1949; Boston, Massachusetts, U.S.
- Died: 27 April 2019 (aged 69); Dundee, Scotland, United Kingdom

Academic background
- Education: Columbia University; King's College, London
- Thesis: "A translation and historical commentary of George Akropolites' History" (1978)
- Doctoral advisor: Donald Nicol

Academic work
- Institutions: Queen's University Belfast; University of St Andrews (1978–1998); University of Birmingham (1994–2019)
- Main interests: Byzantine literature; Byzantine history
- Notable works: George Akropolites: The History

Ruth Iouliani (Juliana) Macrides (1 October 1949 – 27 April 2019) was a UK-based historian of the Byzantine Empire. At the time of her death, she was Reader in Byzantine Studies at the Centre for Byzantine, Ottoman and Greek Studies at the University of Birmingham. She was an expert in Byzantine history, culture and politics, particularly of the mid-later Byzantine period, and on the reception of Byzantium in Britain and Greece.

== Education and career ==
After graduation from Girls' Latin School in Boston, Massachusetts, in 1967, Macrides received her B.A. in Classics (Ancient Greek and Art History) from Columbia University in 1971. She was a Junior Fellow at Dumbarton Oaks Research Library and Collection, 1975–1976. Macrides was awarded a PhD at King's College, London, in 1978 for a thesis entitled A translation and historical commentary of George Akropolites' History. Akropolites' History was the major Greek source for the Latin occupation of Constantinople in the thirteenth century. Macrides' doctoral supervisor was Donald Nicol. Macrides published her translation in 2007.

After a fellowship at the Institut für Rechtsgeschichte in Frankfurt and a teaching spell at Queen's University Belfast, Macrides was lecturer in Medieval History at the University of St Andrews between 1978 and 1998. She joined the University of Birmingham in 1994, initially sharing a position with her long-time colleague, friend and one-time housemate Leslie Brubaker. She was appointed to a full-time post at Birmingham in 2000. In 2013, she was promoted to Reader in Byzantine Studies at Birmingham.

With Peter Mackridge, Macrides was editor of the prominent journal Byzantine and Modern Greek Studies. Upon her unexpected death, her predecessor as editor, John Haldon, temporarily resumed the editorship. She was convenor of the weekly General Seminar of the Centre for Byzantine, Ottoman and Modern Greek Studies at Birmingham. At Birmingham, she supervised the doctoral theses of 12 students, of which 10 she had seen to completion.

== Awards and honours ==
Macrides was a Senior Fellow at Dumbarton Oaks Research Library and Collection. She also held a fellowship at Dumbarton Oaks between January and May 2010, carrying out a project called 'Imperial Ceremonial in Palaiologan Constantinople'. She was a Committee Member for the Society, Arts, and Letters of the British School at Athens. At the time of her death, she was preparing a project on Byzantine co-emperors, to be carried out during a visiting fellowship (a 'Membership') at the School of Historical Studies at Princeton University in the academic year 2019/20.

== Death ==
Macrides died suddenly in Dundee, Scotland, on 27 April 2019, as a result of a brain hemorrhage. A tribute page was created by the University of Birmingham, with contributions from Macrides' friends, colleagues and students. A Greek Orthodox funeral service for Macrides took place on Tuesday 14 May 2019 at St. Leonard's Chapel, St. Andrews, Scotland.

== Bibliography ==
=== Books ===
- Kinship and Justice in Byzantium, 11th–15th centuries (Aldershot 1999) [reprints]
- (ed.) Travel in the Byzantine World: Papers from the Thirty-Fourth Spring Symposium of Byzantine Studies, Birmingham, April 2000 (Aldershot 2002)
- (ed.) George Akropolites: The History (Oxford 2007)
- (ed.) History as Literature in Byzantium: Papers from the Fortieth Spring Symposium of Byzantine Studies, University of Birmingham, April 2007 (Farnham 2010)
- (ed. with J.A. Munitiz and D. Angelov) Pseudo-Kodinos and the Constantinopolitan Court: Offices and Ceremonies (Ashgate 2013) ISBN 9780367601195

=== Selected articles and chapters ===
- ‘Saints and sainthood in the early Palaiologan period’, in S. Hackel, ed., The Byzantine Saint (London 1981), 67–87
- ‘Poetic justice in the Patriarchate: Murder and cannibalism in the provinces’, in L. Burgmann, M. T. Fögen and A. Schminck, eds., Cupido legum (Frankfurt 1985), 137–168
- ‘The Byzantine godfather’, Byzantine and Modern Greek Studies 11 (1987), 139–162
- 'Killing, Asylum, and the Law in Byzantium,' Speculum 63.3 (1988): 509-538
- ‘Subversion and loyalty in the cult of St Demetrios’, Byzantinoslavica 51 (1990), 189–197
- ‘Dynastic marriages and political kinship’, in J. Shepard and S. Franklin, eds., Byzantine diplomacy (Aldershot 1992), 380–410
- ‘From the Komnenoi to the Palaiologoi: imperial models in decline and exile’, in P. Magdalino, ed., New Constantines (Aldershot 1992), 269–282
- ‘“As Byzantine then as it is today”: Pope Joan and Roidis’ Greece’, in D. Ricks and P. Magdalino, eds., Byzantium and the Modern Greek Identity (Aldershot 1998), 73–86
- ‘The pen and the sword: who wrote the Alexiad?', in Th. Gouma-Peterson, ed., Anna Komnene and her times (New York 2000), 63–81
- ‘Substitute parents and their children’, in M. Corbier, ed., Adoption et fosterage (Paris 2000), 307–319
- ‘Constantinople: the crusaders' gaze’, in R. Macrides, ed., Travel in the Byzantine World (Aldershot 2002), 193–212
- ‘George Akropolites' rhetoric’, in E. Jeffreys, ed., Rhetoric in Byzantium (Aldershot 2003), 201–11
- ‘The thirteenth century in Byzantine historical writing’, in Ch. Dendrinos, J. Harris, E. Harvalia-Crook, J. Herrin, eds., Porphyrogenita: Essays in honour of Julian Chrysostomides (London 2003), 63–76
- ‘The ritual of petition’, in P. Roilos and D. Yatromanolakis, eds., Greek Ritual Poetics (Cambridge, MA, 2004), 356–70
- ‘1204: The Greek sources’, in A. Laiou (ed) Urbs capta: The fourth Crusade and its consequences; la quatrième croisade et ses conséquences (Paris 2005), 143–152
- ‘The law outside the lawbooks: law and literature’, Fontes Minores XI (2005), 133–145
- ‘"The reason is not known". Remembering and recording the past. Pseudo-Kodinos as a historian’, in P. Odorico, P.A. Agapitos, M. Hinterberger (eds), L'écriture de la mémoire. La littérarité de l'histographie (Paris 2006), 317–330
- ‘Ceremonies and the city: the court in fourteenth-century Constantinople’, in J. Duindam, T. Artan, M. Kunt, eds., Royal courts in dynastic states and empires: a global perspective (Leiden 2011), 217–35
- ‘Trial by ordeal in Byzantium: on whose authority?’, in P. Armstrong, ed., Authority in Byzantium (Farnham 2013), 31–46
- ‘The citadel of Byzantine Constantinople’, in S. Redford and N. Ergin, eds., Cities and citadels in Turkey from the Iron Age to the Seljuks (Louvain 2013), 277–304
- ‘How the Byzantines wrote history’, in S. Marjanović-Dušanić, ed., Proceedings of the 23rd International Congress of Byzantine Studies (Belgrade, 22–27 August 2016): Plenary Papers (Belgrade, 2016), 333–339 ISBN 9788680656007
- ‘Emperor and church in the last centuries of Byzantium’, Studies in Church History 54 (2018), 123–43
- ‘Women in the late Byzantine court’, in E. Kountoura-Galaki and E. Mitsiou, eds., Women and monasticism in the medieval eastern Mediterranean: decoding a cultural map (Athens 2019), 187–206 ISBN 978-960-9538-88-6
- ‘The Logos of Nicholas Mesarites’, in M. Mullett and R. Ousterhout, ed., The Holy Apostles: A lost monument, a forgotten project, and the presentness of the past (Washington, DC 2020), 175–191 ISBN 9780884024644
- (with Jeff Brubaker) ‘George Akropolites’, in A. Mallett, ed., Franks and crusades in medieval eastern Christian historiography (Turnhout 2021), 125–151 ISBN 9782503565811
