= List of recipients of the Pour le Mérite for Sciences and Arts =

This is a list of recipients of the Pour le Mérite for Sciences and Arts (German: Pour le Mérite für Wissenschaften und Künste), a German and formerly Prussian honor given since 1842 for achievement in the humanities, sciences, or arts.

Date of award	Name	Description	Residence
1842	Friedrich Wilhelm Bessel	Astronomer	Königsberg
1842	August Boeckh	Antiquity researcher	Berlin
1842	Franz Bopp	Linguist of Sanskrit	Berlin
1842	Leopold von Buch	Geologist and paleontologist	Berlin
1842	Peter von Cornelius	Painter	Berlin
1842	Johann Friedrich Dieffenbach	Surgeon	Berlin
1842	Karl Friedrich Eichhorn	Lawyer	Berlin
1842	Christian Gottfried Ehrenberg	Naturalist	Berlin
1842	Johann Franz Encke	Astronomer	Berlin
1842	Carl Friedrich Gauss	Mathematician & astronomer	Göttingen
1842	Jakob Grimm	Germanist	Berlin
1842	Alexander von Humboldt	Naturalist	Berlin
1842	Karl Gustav Jakob Jacobi	Mathematician	Königsberg
1842	Karl Friedrich Lessing	Painter	Düsseldorf
1842	Felix Mendelssohn-Bartholdy	Composer	Berlin
1842	Klemens Wenzel Fürst von Metternich-Winneburg	Statesmen	Vienna
1842	Giacomo Meyerbeer	Composer	Berlin
1842	Eilhard Mitscherlich	Chemist	Berlin
1842	Johannes Peter Müller	Physiologist	Berlin
1842	Carl Ritter	Geographer	Berlin
1842	Friedrich Rückert	Poet and orientalist	Berlin
1842	Friedrich Carl von Savigny	Lawyer	Berlin
1842	Johann Gottfried Schadow	Sculptor	Berlin
1842	Friedrich Wilhelm Joseph Schelling	Philosopher	Berlin
1842	August Wilhelm von Schlegel	Poet	Bonn
1842	Julius Schnorr von Carolsfeld	Painter	Munich
1842	Johann Lukas Schönlein	Pathologist	Berlin
1842	Ludwig Michael Schwanthaler	Sculptor	Munich
1842	Ludwig Tieck	Poet	Berlin
1842	Dominique François Jean Arago	Physicist	Paris
1842	Francesco Maria Avellino	Archeologist	Naples
1842	Jöns Jacob Berzelius	Chemist	Stockholm
1842	Bartolomeo Borghesi	Archeologist	San Marino
1842	Robert Brown	Botanist	London
1842	François-René de Chateaubriand	Writer	Paris
1842	Louis Jacques Mandé Daguerre	Painter and inventor of the photos	Paris
1842	Michael Faraday	Chemist and physicist	London
1842	Pierre Francois Leonard Fontaine	Architect	Paris
1842	Vittorio Fossombroni	Economist	Florence
1842	Joseph Louis Gay-Lussac	Chemist and physicist	Paris
1842	John Herschel	Astronomer	London
1842	Jean Auguste Dominique Ingres	Painter	Paris
1842	Bartholomäus Kopitar	Slavist	Vienna
1842	Adam Johann von Krusenstern	Research traveler	St. Petersburg
1842	Jean-Antoine Letronne	Numismatist	Paris
1842	Franz Liszt	Musician	Paris
1842	Macedonio Melloni	Physicist	Naples
1842	Thomas Moore	Poet	Wiltshire
1842	Hans Christian Ørsted	Physicist	Copenhagen
1842	Gioacchino Rossini	Composer	Bologna
1842	Vasily Zhukovsky	Poet	St. Petersburg
1842	Gasparo Spontini	Composer	Maiolati
1842	Albert Thorvaldsen	Sculptor	Copenhagen
1842	Paolo Toschi	Engraver	Parma
1842	Horace Vernet	Painter	Paris
1844	Stephan Endlicher	Botanist	Vienna
1844	Alessandro Manzoni	Poet	Milan
1844	Adam Oehlenschläger	Poet	Copenhagen
1845	Heinrich Friedrich Link	Botanist	Berlin
1845	Théodore Gudin	Painter	Paris
1845	Pavel Jozef Šafárik	Slavist	Prague
1846	Gottfried Hermann	Classical philologist	Leipzig
1847	Sir David Brewster	Physicist	Edinburgh
1848	Karl Sigismund Kunth	Botanist	Berlin
1848	Louis Spohr	Composer	Kassel
1849	Georg Friedrich Creuzer	Classical philologist	Heidelberg
1849	Wilhelm von Kaulbach	Painter	Munich
1849	Karl Ernst von Baer	Zoologist	St. Petersburg
1849	Augustin Louis Cauchy	Mathematician	Paris
1849	François Pierre Guillaume Guizot	Historian	Paris
1849	Carl Benedict Hase	Classical philologist	Paris
1850	Wilhelm von Schadow	Painter	Düsseldorf
1850	Jean-Baptiste Biot	Physicist	Paris
1850	Eugene Burnouf	Orientalist	Paris
1850	Paul Delaroche	Painter	Paris
1850	Joseph von Hammer-Purgstall	Orientalist	Vienna
1851	Justus Freiherr von Liebig	Chemist	Giessen
1851	Friedrich Tiedemann	Physiologist	Frankfurt am Main
1851	Daniel François Esprit Auber	Composer	Paris
1851	Friedrich Georg Wilhelm von Struve	Astronomer	Pulkovo
1852	Louis Gallait	Painter	City of Brussels
1852	Sir Richard Owen	Zoologist and paleontologist	London
1852	Pietro Tenerani	Sculptor	Rome
1853	Christian Samuel Weiss	Mineralogist	Berlin
1853	Honoré Théodoric d'Albert de Luynes	Archaeologist	Paris
1853	Thomas Babington Macaulay	Historian	London
1853	Sir Henry Creswicke Rawlinson, 1st Baronet	Orientalist	Baghdad
1854	Sir George Biddell Airy	Astronomer	Greenwich
1854	Jakob Ignaz Hittorff	Architect	Paris
1854	Peter Gustav Lejeune Dirichlet	Mathematician	Göttingen
1854	Christian August Lobeck	Classical philologist	Königsberg
1854	Leopold Ranke	Historian	Berlin
1855	Auguste Gaspard Louis Desnoyers	Engraver	Paris
1855	Jean-Baptiste Dumas	Chemist	Paris
1855	Johann Friedrich Overbeck	Painter	Rome
1857	Christian Lassen	Orientalist	Bonn
1857	Wilhelm Karl Ritter von Haidinger	Geologist	Vienna
1857	Joseph Nicolas Robert-Fleury	Painter	Paris
1857	François Forster	Engraver	Paris
1857	Sir Edward Sabine	Physicist and astronomer	London
1858	Ernst Friedrich August Rietschel	Sculptor	Dresden
1858	Friedrich August Stüler	Architect	Berlin
1859	Ernst Heinrich Weber	Physicist	Leipzig
1860	Heinrich Wilhelm Dove	Meteorologist	Berlin
1860	Johann August Eduard Mandel	Engraver	Berlin
1860	Franz Ernst Neumann	Physicist	Königsberg
1860	Friedrich Christoph Schlosser	Historian	Heidelberg
1860	Louis Agassiz	Naturalist	New Cambridge near Boston
1860	John Charles Frémont	Research traveler	Washington, D.C.
1861	August Immanuel Bekker	Classical philologist	Berlin
1861	Friedrich von Hermann	Economist and statistician	Munich
1861	Leo von Klenze	Architect	Munich
1861	Heinrich Rose	Chemist	Berlin
1861	Edme-François Jomard	Geographer	Paris
1863	Friedrich Drake	Sculptor	Berlin
1863	Carl Joseph Anton Mittermaier	Jurist	Heidelberg
1863	Friedrich von Raumer	Historian	Berlin
1863	Jean Hippolyte Flandrin	Painter	Paris
1863	Edward Hincks	Orientalist	Killyleagh, Ireland
1863	Sir Charles Lyell	Geologist	London
1863	Jean-Victor Poncelet	Mathematician	Paris
1864	Robert Bunsen	Chemist	Heidelberg
1864	Eduard Grell	Composer	Berlin
1864	Georg Friedrich Schömann	Classical philologist	Greifswald
1864	Wilhelm Eduard Weber	Physicist	Göttingen
1864	Friedrich Wöhler	Chemist	Göttingen
1864	Georg Friedrich Ziebland	Architect	Munich
1865	Léon Cogniet	Painter	Paris
1865	Amedeo Peyron	Orientalist	Turin
1866	Friedrich Christian Diez	Romanist	Bonn
1866	Peter Andreas Hansen	Astronomer	Gotha
1866	Johann Heinrich Strack	Architect	Berlin
1866	Christopher Hansteen	Astronomer	Christiania
1867	Eduard Bendemann	Painter	Düsseldorf
1867	Peter Clodt von Jürgensburg	Sculptor	St. Petersburg
1867	Louis Pierre Henriquel-Dupont	Engraver	Paris
1867	Henri Milne-Edwards	Zoologist and physiologist	Paris
1868	Heinrich Leberecht Fleischer	Orientalist	Leipzig
1868	August Meineke	Classical philologist	Berlin
1868	Theodor Mommsen	Historian	Berlin
1868	Charles Robert Darwin	Naturalist	London
1868	Félix Duban	Architect	Paris
1868	Henri Victor Regnault	Chemist and physicist	Paris
1868	Sir Charles Wheatstone	Physicist	London
1869	John of Saxony	Researcher (Italian literature)	
1869	Johan Nicolai Madvig	Classical philologist	Copenhagen
1869	Franz von Miklosich	Slavist	Vienna
1870	Adolph Menzel	Painter	Berlin
1870	Johan Peter Molin	Sculptor	Stockholm
1871	Moritz Haupt	Classical philologist and Germanist	Berlin
1871	Gustav Rose	Mineralogist	Berlin
1872	Richard Lepsius	Egyptologist	Berlin
1872	Friedrich Adolf Trendelenburg	Philosopher	Berlin
1872	Sir Edwin Henry Landseer	Painter	London
1872	Elias Lönnrot	Researcher (Finnish language)	Helsingfors
1872	Thomas Romney Robinson	Astronomer	Armagh, Ireland
1873	Hermann Helmholtz	Physicist and physiologist	Berlin
1873	Ludwig Knaus	Painter	Düsseldorf
1873	Nicaise de Keyser	Painter	Antwerp
1874	Friedrich Wilhelm August Argelander	Astronomer	Bonn
1874	Ernst Julius Hähnel	Sculptor	Dresden
1874	Gustav Kirchhoff	Physicist	Heidelberg
1874	Helmuth von Moltke the Elder	War researcher	Berlin
1874	Heinrich von Sybel	Historian	Bonn
1874	Thomas Carlyle	Historian	London
1874	Humphrey Lloyd	Physicist	Dublin
1874	Max Müller	Orientalist	Oxford
1874	Gottfried Semper	Architect	Vienna
1875	Karl Weierstrass	Mathematician	Berlin
1875	George Bancroft	Historian	Washington, D.C.
1875	Henry Wadsworth Longfellow	Poet	Cambridge, Massachusetts, US
1875	Theodor Schwann	Physiologist	Liège
1875	William Stokes	Physicist	Dublin
1876	Otto von Böhtlingk	Orientalist	Jena
1877	Emil du Bois-Reymond	Physiologist	Berlin
1877	Georg Curtius	Classical philologist	Leipzig
1877	Eduard Zeller	Philosopher	Berlin
1877	Japetus Steenstrup	Zoologist	Copenhagen
1878	Ernst Wilhelm von Brücke	Physiologist	Vienna
1878	Charles Hermite	Mathematician	Paris
1879	Ernst Curtius	Historian	Berlin
1879	Karl Theodor Ernst von Siebold	Zoologist	Munich
1879	Sir George Stokes, 1st Baronet	Mathematician	Cambridge, England
1880	Adolf Erik Nordenskiöld	Arctic explorer	Stockholm
1880	Friedrich von Schmidt	Architect	Vienna
1881	Andreas Achenbach	Painter	Düsseldorf
1881	Friedrich Hitzig	Architect	Berlin
1881	Lawrence Alma-Tadema	Painter	London
1881	Niels Gade	Composer	Copenhagen
1881	William Dwight Whitney	Orientalist	New Haven, Connecticut, US
1882	Gustav Richter	Painter	Berlin
1882	Johannes Schilling	Sculptor	Dresden
1882	Marcellin Berthelot	Chemist	Paris
1882	Jean-Baptiste Boussingault	Chemist and astronomer	Paris
1882	Giuseppe Fiorelli	Archaeologist	Rome
1882	Otto Wilhelm von Struve	Astronomer	Pulkovo
1882	Bernhard Studer	Geologist	Bern
1883	Reinhold Begas	Sculptor	Berlin
1883	August Wilhelm von Hofmann	Chemist	Berlin
1884	Fritz Schaper	Sculptor	Berlin
1884	Michele Amari	Historian and orientalist	Pisa
1884	William Thomson, 1st Baron Kelvin	Physicist	Glasgow
1885	Georg Waitz	Historian	Berlin
1885	Joseph Lister	Surgeon	London
1886	August Friedrich Pott	Linguist	Halle
1886	Giovanni Battista Carlo de Rossi	Archeologist	Rome
1886	Werner von Siemens	Physicist	Charlottenburg
1887	Johannes Brahms	Composer	Vienna
1887	Gustav Freytag	Novelist and playwright	Wiesbaden
1887	Giulio Monteverde	Sculptor	Rome
1887	Heinrich von Treitschke	Historian	Berlin
1887	Giuseppe Fortunio Francesco Verdi	Composer	Sant'Agata
1887	William Wright	Orientalist	Cambridge, England
1888	Rudolf Julius Emanuel Clausius	Physicist	Bonn
1888	Heinrich Rudolf Hermann Friedrich von Gneist	Jurist	Berlin
1888	Theodor Noldeke	Orientalist	Strasbourg
1888	Frederic Leighton	Painter	London
1888	Jean Charles Galissard de Marignac	Chemist	Geneva
1888	Giuseppe Giovanni Antonio Meneghini	Geologist	Pisa
1888	Emile Wauters	Painter	City of Brussels
1889	Karl Friedrich Wilhelm Ludwig	Physiologist	Leipzig
1890	Karl Franz Eduard von Gebhardt	Painter	Düsseldorf
1891	Hermann Ende	Architect	Berlin
1891	Adolf von Hildebrand	Sculptor	Munich
1891	Julius von Verdy du Vernois	Military writer	Berlin
1891	Alphonse Louis Pierre Pyramus de Candolle	Botanist	Geneva
1891	Vatroslav Jagić	Slavist	Vienna
1891	Johan Hendrik Caspar Kern	Linguist and Indologist	Leiden
1891	Austen Henry Layard	Archaeologist	London
1891	Anton Rubinstein	Musician	St. Petersburg
1891	Pasquale Villari	Historian	Rome
1892	Arthur Auwers	Astronomer	Berlin
1892	Benjamin Apthorp Gould	Astronomer	Cambridge, Massachusetts, US
1892	John Everett Millais	Painter	London
1893	August Kekulé	Chemist	Bonn
1893	August Kundt	Physicist	Berlin
1893	Eduard Friedrich Wilhelm Pflüger	Physiologist	Bonn
1893	Sven Ludvig Lovén	Zoologist	Stockholm
1893	Ludwig Passini	Painter	Venice
1894	Jacob Georg Agardh	Botanist	Lund
1894	Alfred von Arneth	Historian	Vienna
1895	Adolf von Baeyer	Chemist	Munich
1895	Hermann Carl Vogel	Astrophysicist	Potsdam
1895	Michael Jan de Goeje	Arabist	Leiden
1895	Jacobus Henricus van 't Hoff	Chemist	Amsterdam
1895	Friedrich Imhoof-Blumer	Numismatist	Winterthur
1895	Giovanni Schiaparelli	Astronomer	Milan
1896	Otto von Bismarck	Statesman	Berlin
1896	Heinrich Brunner	Jurist	Berlin
1896	Herman Grimm	Art historian	Berlin
1896	Albert von Kölliker	Anatomist	Würzburg
1896	Friedrich Wilhelm Kohlrausch	Physicist	Charlottenburg
1896	Alexander Kovalevsky	Zoologist	St. Petersburg
1897	Johann Wilhelm Hittorf	Physicist	Münster
1897	Rudolf Leuckart	Zoologist	Leipzig
1897	Carl Neumann	Mathematician	Leipzig
1897	Hermann Usener	Classical philologist	Bonn
1897	Albrecht Weber	Orientalist	Berlin
1897	Francisco Pradilla Ortiz	Painter	Madrid
1897	William Stubbs	Historian	Oxford
1898	Johann Kaspar Julius Ficker von Feldhaus	Religious historian	Innsbruck
1898	Sir William Henry Flower	Naturalist	London
1898	Gustav Oscar August Montelius	Archeologist	Stockholm
1898	Sir John Murray	Oceanographer	Edinburgh
1898	Simon Schwendener	Botanist	Berlin
1899	Joseph Joachim	Musician	Berlin
1899	Gustav von Schmoller	Economist and historian	Berlin
1899	Hubert Herkomer	Painter	Lululaund near London
1900	Max Joseph von Pettenkofer	Hygienicist and chemist	Munich
1901	Charles-Camille Saint-Saëns	Composer	Paris
1901	Rudolf Virchow	Pathologist	Berlin
1901	Julius Wellhausen	Historian and orientalist	Göttingen
1902	Alexander Emanuel Agassiz	Zoologist	Cambridge, Massachusetts, US
1902	John Lubbock, 1st Baron Avebury	Biologist and archaeologist	Downe, Kent
1902	Luigi Antonio Gaudenzio Cremona	Mathematician	Rome
1902	Carl Gegenbaur	Anatomist	Heidelberg
1902	Adolf von Harnack	Theologian and church historian	Berlin
1902	Sir Joseph Dalton Hooker	Botanist	Kyiv
1902	Carl Justi	Church historian	Bonn
1902	Gaston Paris	Scholar of Romance literature	Paris
1902	Peter Petrowitsch von Semjonow-Tienschanski	Geographer	St. Petersburg
1903	Adolf Mussafia	Romanist	Vienna
1903	John William Strutt, 3rd Baron Rayleigh	Physicist	Terling Place, Witham, Essex
1903	Theodor Ritter von Sickel	Historian	Merano
1904	Hermann Emil Fischer	Chemist	Berlin
1904	François-Auguste Baron Gevaert	Music historian and composer	City of Brussels
1904	Adolf Kirchhoff	Classical philologist	Berlin
1904	Peter Ludwig Mejdell Sylow	Mathematician	Christiania
1905	Graziadio Isaia Ascoli	Linguist	Milan
1905	Franz Jacob von Defregger	Artist	Munich
1905	Simon Newcomb	Astronomer	Washington, D.C.
1906	Franz Bücheler	Classical philologist	Bonn
1906	Léopold Victor Delisle	Historian	Paris
1906	Robert Koch	Bacteriologist	Berlin
1908	Max Bruch	Composer	Berlin
1908	James Bryce, 1st Viscount Bryce	Historian and jurist	London
1908	Wilhelm Dilthey	Philosopher	Berlin
1908	Hendrik Antoon Lorentz	Physicist	Leiden
1908	Wilhelm Friedrich Philipp Pfeffer	Plant physiologist and botanist	Leipzig
1908	Friedrich Wilhelm Radloff	Linguist (Turkic studies)	St. Petersburg
1908	John Singer Sargent	Artist	London
1908	Gabriel Ritter von Seidl	Architect	Munich
1908	Johannes Vahlen	Classical philologist	Berlin
1908	Ulrich von Wilamowitz-Moellendorff	Classical philologist	Berlin
1910	Sir David Gill	Astronomer	London
1910	Ferdinand Graf von Zeppelin	Aeronaut	Friedrichshafen
1911	Colmar Freiherr von der Goltz	Military theorist	Berlin
1911	Karl Ewald Konstantin Hering	Physiologist	Leipzig
1911	Andreas Heusler	Jurist	Basel
1911	Otto Lessing	Sculptor	Berlin
1911	Sir William Ramsay	Chemist	London
1911	Gustaf Magnus Retzius	Histologist	Stockholm
1911	Wilhelm Conrad Röntgen	Physicist	Munich
1911	Gustav Schönleber	Artist	Karlsruhe
1911	Vilhelm Ludwig Peter Thomsen	Orientalist	Copenhagen
1912	Julius Ferdinand von Hann	Meteorologist	Vienna
1912	Reinhold Koser	Historian	Berlin
1912	August Louis Tuaillon	Sculptor	Berlin
1912	Sir William Turner	Anatomist	Edinburgh
1912	Wilhelm Maximilian Wundt	Psychologist and philosopher	Leipzig
1913	Léon Joseph Florentin Bonnat	Artist	Paris
1913	Hermann Diels	Classical philologist	Berlin
1913	Ernst Emil Ludwig Hoffmann	Architect	Berlin
1914	Camillo Golgi	Physician and histologist	Pavia
1914	Hans Grässel	Architect	Munich
1915	Heinrich von Angeli	Artist	Vienna
1915	Otto Friedrich von Gierke	Jurist	Berlin
1915	Jacobus Cornelius Kapteyn	Astronomer	Groningen
1915	Max Karl Ernst Ludwig Planck	Physicist	Berlin
1915	Santiago Ramón y Cajal	Physician and histologist	Madrid
1915	Hugo Ritter von Seeliger	Astronomer	Munich
1916	Hugo Freiherr von Freytag-Loringhoven	Military theorist	Weimar
1916	Rudolph Sohm	Jurist	Leipzig
1917	Max Klinger	Printmaker and sculptor	Leipzig
1917	Walther Hermann Nernst	Physicist	Berlin
1917	Hans Thoma	Artist and designer	Munich
1918	Adolf Erman	Egyptologist	Berlin
1918	Georg Friedrich Knapp	Economist and political theorist	Strasbourg
1918	Johannes Adolf von Kries	Physiologist	Freiburg
1918	Carl Ritter von Linde	Engineer	Munich
1918	Eduard Meyer	Historian and orientalist	Berlin
November 1918	Ceased with the end of the Prussian monarchy.		
1919–1922	No award made.		
1923	Revived with the President of Germany as head of the order.		
1923	Albert Einstein	Physicist	Berlin
1923	Gerhart Hauptmann	Poet	Agnetendorf
1923	Felix Klein	Mathematician	Göttingen
1923	Hugo Lederer	Sculptor	Berlin
1923	Max Liebermann	Artist	Berlin
1924	Georg Gottfried Julius Dehio	Art historian	Tübingen
1924	Richard von Hertwig	Zoologist	Munich
1924	Hermann von Kuhl	Military writer	Berlin
1924	Heinrich Lüders	Indologist	Berlin
1924	Hans Erich Pfitzner	Composer and conductor	Munich
1924	Eduard Schwartz	Classical philologist	Munich
1924	Max Slevogt	Artist and printmaker	Berlin
1924	Richard Georg Strauss	Composer and conductor	Garmisch
1924	Richard Willstätter	Chemist	Munich
1925	Hugo von Habermann	Artist	Munich
1925	Ludolf von Krehl	Physician	Heidelberg
1926	David Hilbert	Mathematician	Göttingen
1926	Leopold Karl Walter Graf von Kalckreuth	Artist and printmaker	Munich
1926	Albrecht Penck	Geographer	Berlin
1926	Karl Vossler	Romanist	Munich
1929	Wilhelm von Bode	Art historian and museum director	Berlin
1929	Gustav Heinrich Ernst Martin Wilhelm Furtwängler	Conductor and composer	Berlin
1929	Käthe Kollwitz	Artist and printmaker	Berlin
1929	Carl Stumpf	Physiologist and philosopher	Berlin
1931	Enno Littmann	Orientalist	Tübingen
1931	Wilhelm Schulze	Indogermanist	Berlin
1931	Theodor Wiegand	Archaeologist	Berlin
1932	Paul Fridolin Kehr	Historian	Berlin
1933	Ernst Heinrich Barlach	Sculptor, printmaker and poet	Güstrow
1933	Heinrich Wölfflin	Art historian	Zürich
1933	Absorbed into the state honours system of Nazi Germany.		
1933–1945			
1946–1952	No award made.		
1952	Revived with West German president Theodor Heuss as head of the order.		
1952	Paul Bonatz	Architect	Stuttgart
1952	Walther Wilhelm Georg Bothe	Physicist	Heidelberg
1952	Ernst Robert Curtius	Romanist	Bonn
1952	Ludwig Curtius	Archaeologist	Rome
1952	Gerhard Domagk	Physician	Wuppertal-Elberfeld
1952	Karl Ritter von Frisch	Zoologist	Munich
1952	Erich Haenisch	Sinologist	Herrenchiemsee
1952	Otto Hahn	Chemist	Göttingen
1952	Max Hartmann	Biologist	Tübingen
1952	Paul Hindemith	Composer, violist and conductor	Zürich
1952	Karl Hofer	Artist and printmaker	Berlin
1952	Erich Kaufmann	Jurist	Bonn
1952	Max Theodor Felix von Laue	Physicist	Berlin
1952	Theodor Litt	Philosopher	Bonn
1952	Gerhard Marcks	Sculptor	Cologne
1952	Friedrich Meinecke	Historian	Berlin
1952	Emil Nolde	Artist and printmaker	Seebüll
1952	Karl Reinhardt	Classical philologist	Frankfurt am Main
1952	Otto Renner	Botanist	Munich
1952	Paul Schmitthenner	Architect	Kilchberg
1952	Reinhold Schneider	Writer and poet	Freiburg
1952	Rudolf Alexander Schröder	Poet	Sonnleithen
1952	Renée Sintenis	Artist and printmaker	Berlin
1952	Eduard Spranger	Philosopher	Tübingen
1952	Otto Warburg	Biochemist	Berlin
1952	Heinrich Wieland	Chemist	Starnberg
1952	Adolf Windaus	Chemist	Göttingen
1954	Niels Henrik David Bohr	Physicist	Copenhagen
1954	Carl Jacob Burckhardt	Historian	Vinzel, Switzerland
1954	Arthur H. Compton	Physicist	St. Louis, US
1954	George Peabody Gooch	Historian	Chalfont St. Peter, England
1954	Hermann Hesse	Writer	Montagnola, Switzerland
1954	Sarvepalli Radhakrishnan	Philosopher of religion	New Delhi
1954	Albert Schweitzer	Philosopher, theologian and music historian	Lambarene
1954	Alfred Weber	Sociologist	Heidelberg
1955	Sir Henry Hallett Dale	Physiologist	London
1955	Étienne Gilson	Philosopher	Paris
1955	Werner Jaeger	Classical philologist	Cambridge, Massachusetts, US
1955	Klas Bernhard Johannes Karlgren	Sinologist	Stockholm
1955	Oskar Kokoschka	Artist, printmaker and writer	Villeneuve, Switzerland
1955	Thomas Mann	Writer	Kilchberg, Switzerland
1955	Gilbert Murray	Greek scholar	Oxford
1955	Hans Purrmann	Artist and printmaker	Montagnola, Switzerland
1956	Luigi Einaudi	Economist	Dogliani, Italy
1956	Max Huber	Jurist	Zürich
1956	Lise Meitner	Physicist	Stockholm
1956	Carl Orff	Composer	Dießen am Ammersee
1956	Karl Schmidt-Rottluff	Artist	Berlin
1956	Erwin Schrödinger	Physicist	Vienna
1956	Thornton Wilder	Writer	New Haven, Connecticut, US
1957	Werner Heisenberg	Physicist	Munich
1957	George de Hevesy	Chemist and physicist	Stockholm
1957	Charles B. Huggins	Physician	Chicago
1957	Ludwig Mies van der Rohe	Architect	Chicago
1957	Gerhard Ritter	Historian	Freiburg
1958	Werner Bergengruen	Writer	Baden-Baden
1958	Romano Guardini	Philosopher	Munich
1958	Richard Kuhn	Chemist and biochemist	Heidelberg
1958	Percy Ernst Schramm	Historian	Göttingen
1959	Ernst Beutler	Literary scholar	Frankfurt am Main
1959	Ernst Buschor	Archaeologist	Munich
1959	Thomas Stearns Eliot	Poet	London
1959	François Louis Ganshof	Historian	City of Brussels
1959	Pieter Catharinus Arie Geyl	Historian	Utrecht
1960	Hans Kienle	Astronomer	Heidelberg
1961	Hans Rothfels	Historian	Tübingen
1961	Carl Friedrich Freiherr von Weizsäcker	Physicist and philosopher	Hamburg
1962	Adolf Butenandt	Biochemist	Munich
1962	Albert Defant	Geophysicist	Innsbruck
1962	Franz Dölger	Byzantinist	Munich
1962	Wolfgang Schadewaldt	Classical philologist	Tübingen
1963	André-Jean Festugière	Historian	Paris
1963	André Grabar	Art historian	Paris
1963	Gerhard von Rad	Theologian	Heidelberg
1963	Carl Ludwig Siegel	Mathematician	Göttingen
1963	Walther von Wartburg	Romanist	Basel
1964	Rudolf Hillebrecht	Architect and town planner	Hanover
1964	Karl Jaspers	Philosopher	Basel
1964	Alfred Kühn	Zoologist	Tübingen
1966	Sir James Chadwick	Physicist	Denbigh
1966	Annette Kolb	Writer	Munich
1966	Georg Ostrogorsky	Byzantinist	Belgrad
1966	Emil Staiger	Literary historian	Zürich
1966	Alexander Lord Todd	Chemist	Cambridge, England
1966	Wieland Wagner	Opera director and stage designer	Bayreuth
1966	Hans Wimmer	Sculptor	Munich
1967	Kurt Bittel	Archaeologist	Berlin
1967	Erich Heckel	Artist and printmaker	Hemmenhofen
1967	Marie Luise von Kaschnitz	Writer	Frankfurt am Main
1967	Otto Klemperer	Conductor and composer	Zürich
1967	Gyula Moravcsik	Byzantinist	Budapest
1967	Erwin Panofsky	Art historian	Princeton, New Jersey, US
1967	Hideki Yukawa	Physicist	Tokyo
1967	Carl Zuckmayer	Writer	Saas-Fee
1968	Theodor Eschenburg	Political scientist and journalist	Tübingen
1968	Marino Marini	Sculptor and printmaker	Milan
1968	Kurt Mothes	Plant physiologist	Halle
1969	Alvar Aalto	Architect	Helsinki
1969	Sir Cecil Maurice Bowra	Classical philologist	Oxford
1969	Rudolf Bultmann	Theologian	Marburg
1969	Hugo Friedrich	Romanist	Freiburg
1969	Stephan Kuttner	Canonist and legal historian	New Haven, Connecticut, US
1969	Konrad Lorenz	Zoologist	Altenberg, Austria
1969	Franz Wieacker	Legal historian	Göttingen
1969	Karl Waldemar Ziegler	Chemist	Mülheim
1970	Egon Eiermann	Architect	Baden-Baden
1970	Walther Gerlach	Physicist	Munich
1970	Fritz Kortner	Actor and director	Munich
1970	Karl Rahner	Theologian	Münster
1971	Hans-Georg Gadamer	Philosopher	Heidelberg-Ziegelhausen
1971	Rolf Gutbrod	Architect	Stuttgart
1971	Albin Lesky	Classical philologist	Vienna
1971	Feodor Lynen	Biochemist	Munich
1971	Theodor Schieder	Historian	Cologne
1971	Artturi Ilmari Virtanen	Biochemist	Helsinki
1972	Andreas Alföldi	Historian	Princeton, New Jersey, US
1972	Sir Hans Adolf Krebs	Biochemist	Iffley, Oxford
1972	Henry Moore	Sculptor	Much Hadham
1972	Walter Rossow	Garden designer and landscape architect	Berlin
1972	Fritz Winter	Artist	Dießen am Ammersee
1973	Raymond Aron	Sociologist	Paris
1973	Helmut Coing	Jurist	Frankfurt am Main
1973	Manfred Eigen	Physical chemist	Göttingen
1973	Golo Mann	Historian, journalist and writer	Kilchberg, Switzerland
1973	Hans Erich Nossack	Writer	Hamburg
1973	Bartel Leendert van der Waerden	Mathematician	Zürich
1973	Maria Wimmer	Actor	Munich
1974	Wolfgang Gentner	Physicist	Heidelberg
1974	Thrasybulos Georgiades	Musicologist	Munich
1974	Fritz Albert Lipmann	Biochemist	New York City
1974	Sir Ronald Syme	Historian	Oxford
1975	Pierre Boulez	Composer and conductor	Paris
1975	Richard Ettinghausen	Art historian	Princeton, New Jersey, US
1975	Emil Karl Frey	Surgeon	Munich
1975	György Ligeti	Composer	Hamburg
1975	Kenzo Tange	Architect	Tokyo
1976	Peter Huchel	Writer	Staufen im Breisgau
1976	George F. Kennan	Historian and diplomat	Princeton, New Jersey, US
1976	Heinz Maier-Leibnitz	Physicist	Munich
1977	Hansjochem Autrum	Zoologist	Munich
1977	Sir Ernst Gombrich	Art historian	London
1977	Hans Hartung	Artist	Paris
1977	Friedrich August von Hayek	Economist	Freiburg
1977	Bruno Snell	Classical philologist	Hamburg
1978	Gerhard Rudolf Edmund Meyer-Schwickerath	Ophthalmologist	Essen-Bredeney
1978	Victor Friedrich Weisskopf	Physicist	Cambridge, Massachusetts, US
1979	Felix Bloch	Physicist	Palo Alto, US
1979	Elias Canetti	Writer	Zürich
1979	Fritz Schalk	Romanist	Cologne
1980	Wolfgang Paul	Physicist	Bonn
1980	Sir Karl Popper	Philosopher of science	Penn, Buckinghamshire
1980	Werner Reichardt	Physiologist	Tübingen
1980	Leopold Reidemeister	Art historian	Berlin
1981	Wolfgang Clemen	Anglicist	Endorf, Bavaria
1981	Felix Gilbert	Historian	Princeton, New Jersey, US
1981	Gershom Scholem	Philosopher	Jerusalem
1981	Emil Schumacher	Artist	Hagen
1981	Rudolf Serkin	Pianist	Brattleboro, Vermont, US
1981	Hans Georg Zachau	Molecular biologist	Munich
1982	Hendrik B. G. Casimir	Physicist	Heeze, Netherlands
1982	Sir Bernard Katz	Physiologist	London
1982	Ernst Kitzinger	Art historian	Oxford
1983	Carl Dahlhaus	Musicologist	Berlin
1983	Jean Gaudemet	Jurist	Paris
1983	Eugène Ionesco	Writer and designer	Paris
1983	Elisabeth Legge-Schwarzkopf	Opera singer	Zumikon, Switzerland
1984	Hans Albrecht Bethe	Physicist	Ithaca, New York, US
1984	Dietrich Fischer-Dieskau	Opera singer and conductor	Berlin
1984	Hermann Paul Joseph Haken	Physicist	Sindelfingen
1984	Kaii Higashiyama	Landscape artist	Chiba Prefecture, Japan
1984	Otto Kratky	Physical chemist	Graz
1984	Boris Borissowitsch Piotrowski	Archaeologist	Leningrad
1985	Bernhard Bischoff	Palaeographer, philologist and historian	Planegg
1986	Horst Fuhrmann	Historian	Steinebach am Wörthsee
1987	Eduardo Chillida Juantegui	Sculptor	San Sebastián
1987	Max F. Perutz	Biophysicist	Cambridge, England
1988	Stig Fredrik Strömholm	Jurist	Uppsala, Sweden
1990	Gordon Alexander Craig	Historian	Menlo Park, California, US
1990	Carlos Kleiber	Conductor	Grünwald, Bavaria
1990	Jean-Marie Lehn	Chemist	Strasbourg
1990	Albrecht Schöne	Germanist	Göttingen
1991	Bernard Andreae	Archaeologist	Rome
1991	Alfred Brendel	Pianist and Writer	London
1991	Herbert Giersch	Economist	Kiel
1991	Friedrich Hirzebruch	Mathematician	Sankt Augustin
1992	Karl Dietrich Bracher	Historian and political scientist	Bonn
1992	Albert Eschenmoser	Chemist	Küsnacht, Switzerland
1992	Wolfgang Gerok	Physician	Freiburg
1992	Eberhard Jüngel	Theologian	Tübingen
1992	Giorgio Strehler	Stage director	Barcola, Trieste, Italy
1992	Martin Walser	Writer	Überlingen-Nußdorf
1993	Gerhard Casper	Jurist	Stanford, California, US
1993	Sir Henry Chadwick	Church historian	Cambridge, England
1993	Walter Gehring	Biologist	Basel
1993	Robert Huber	Chemist	Germering
1993	Witold Lutoslawski	Composer and conductor	Warsaw
1993	Aribert Reimann	Composer	Berlin
1994	Albrecht Dihle	Classical philologist	Heidelberg
1994	Ludwig Finscher	Musicologist	Wolfenbüttel
1994	Ernst-Joachim Mestmäcker	Jurist	Hamburg
1994	Fritz Stern	Historian	New York City
1995	Peter Busmann	Architect	Cologne
1995	Erwin Neher	Biophysicist	Göttingen
1995	Hubertus von Pilgrim	Sculptor and printmaker	Pullach
1995	Bert Sakmann	Neurobiologist	Martinsried
1995	Robert Merton Solow	Economist	Cambridge, Massachusetts, US
1995	Andrzej Szczypiorski	Writer	Warsaw
1995	Jacques Tits	Mathematician	Paris
1995	Niklaus Wirth	Computer scientist	Zürich
1996	Pina Bausch	Dancer and choreographer	Wuppertal
1996	Peter von Matt	Germanist	Dübendorf, Switzerland
1996	Rudolf Mößbauer	Physicist	Grünwald, Bavaria
1997	Eric Kandel	Neurobiologist	New York City
1997	Dani Karavan	Sculptor	Tel Aviv
1997	Jutta Lampe	Actor	Berlin
1997	Christiane Nüsslein-Volhard	Biologist	Tübingen
1998	Hans Belting	Art historian	Karlsruhe
1998	Umberto Eco	Writer and semiotician	Milan
1998	Charles Weissmann	Molecular biologist	Zürich
1999	Magdalena Abakanowicz	Sculptor	Warsaw
1999	Walter Burkert	Classicist	Zürich
1999	Hans Magnus Enzensberger	Writer and poet	Munich
1999	Sofia Gubaidulina	Composer	Appen near Hamburg
1999	György Kurtág	Composer	Paris
1999	Robert Weinberg	Oncologist	Berlin
1999	Rolf M. Zinkernagel	Immunologist	Zürich
2000	Horst Albach	Business economist	Bonn
2000	Paul Baltes	Psychologist and gerontologist	Berlin
2000	Imre Kertész	Writer	Budapest
2000	Günther Uecker	Painter and sculptor	Düsseldorf
2000	Anton Zeilinger	Physicist	Vienna
2001	Günter Blobel	Cellular biologist	New York City
2001	Nikolaus Harnoncourt	Conductor and cellist	St Georgen im Attergau
2002	Norman Foster	Architect	London
2002	Bronisław Geremek	Historian and statesman	Warsaw
2002	Richard Serra	Artist	New York City
2003	Ralf Dahrendorf	Sociologist	London
2005	Wim Wenders	Film director, author, and photographer	Berlin
2006	Reinhard Selten	Economist	Bonn
2006	James J. Sheehan	Historian	Stanford, California, US
2006	Christian Tomuschat	Jurist	Berlin
2007	Yuri Manin	Mathematician	Bonn
2008	Durs Grünbein	Poet and writer	Berlin
2008	Theodor W. Hänsch	Physicist	Munich
2008	Svante Pääbo	Geneticist and palaeontologist	Leipzig
2009	Lorraine Daston	Historian of science	Berlin
2009	Josef van Ess	Scholar of Islam	Tübingen
2009	Rudolf Jaenisch	Molecular biologist	Cambridge, Massachusetts, US
2010	Brigitte Fassbaender	Opera singer and director	Obing
2010	Anthony Thomas Grafton	Historian	Princeton, New Jersey, US
2010	Barbara Klemm	Photographer	Frankfurt am Main
2010	Willem J. M. Levelt	Psycholinguist	Amsterdam
2011	Hermann Parzinger	Prehistorian	Berlin
2011	András Schiff	Pianist	Budapest
2011	Peter Stein	Theater, opera and film director	Amelia, Umbria, Italy
2011	Eric F. Wieschaus	Evolutionary biologist	Princeton, New Jersey, US
2012	Caroline Walker Bynum	Medievalist	Atlanta, Georgia, US
2012	Wolfgang Rihm	Composer	Karlsruhe
2013	Reinhard Genzel	Astrophysicist	Garching
2014	Horst Bredekamp	Art historian	Berlin
2014	Claudio Magris	Literary scholar and writer	Trieste, Italy
2014	Onora O'Neill, Baroness O'Neill of Bengarve	Philosopher	London
2014	Michael Stolleis	Jurist and legal historian	Kronberg im Taunus
2015	Daniel Barenboim	Conductor and concert pianist	Berlin
2015	Christoph Wolff	Music historian	Belmont, Massachusetts, US
2016	Hans Clevers	Geneticist	Amsterdam
2016	Rebecca Horn	Artist and director	Bad König
2016	Gidon Kremer	Violinist and conductor	Riga, Latvia
2017	Emmanuelle Charpentier	Microbiologist	Berlin
2017	Jürgen Osterhammel	Historian	Freiburg
2017	Karl Schlögel	Historian	Berlin
2018	Andrea Breth	Stage director	
2018	Michael Haneke	Film director	
2018	Heinz Holliger	Composer, conductor and oboist	
2019	Klaus von Klitzing	Physicist	
2019	Christopher Clark	Historian	
2019	Adam Zagajewski	Writer and poet	
2020	Aleida Assmann	Anglist and cultural scientist	
2020	Jan Assmann	Egyptologist	
2020	Michael Tomasello	Anthropologist	
2021	Herta Müller	Writer	
2021	Peter Schäfer	Judaic scholar	
2022	Jürgen Habermas	Philosoph and sociologist	
2022	David Chipperfield	Architect	
2022	Peter Gülke	Conductor and musicologist	
2022	Stefan Hell	Physicist	
2023	Uğur Şahin	Immunologist	
2023	Özlem Türeci	Physician	
2023	Heinrich Detering	Germanist	
2023	John Neumeier	Dancer and choreographer	
2024	Gerd Faltings	Mathematician	
2024	Stephen Greenblatt	Literary scholar	
2024	Alexander Kluge	Filmmaker and writer	
2024	Susan Trumbore	Geologist	
2025	Michael Grätzel	Physical chemist	
2025	Georges Didi-Huberman	Art historian and philosopher	
2025	Péter Nádas	Writer and photographer	
2025	Sarah Stroumsa	Islamologist	
2025	Antje Boetius	Marine biologist	
2025	Christoph Markschies	Theologian	
2025	Wolf Biermann	Singer-songwriter and poet	

== Bibliography ==
- Lehmann, Gustaf (1913). "VII Friedensklasse 1842–1913". Die Ritter des Ordens pour le mérite 1812–1913 (in German). Vol. 2. Berlin: Ernst Siegfried Mittler & Sohn. pp. 575–598.
