= Reinhard Zimmermann =

German historian and jurist

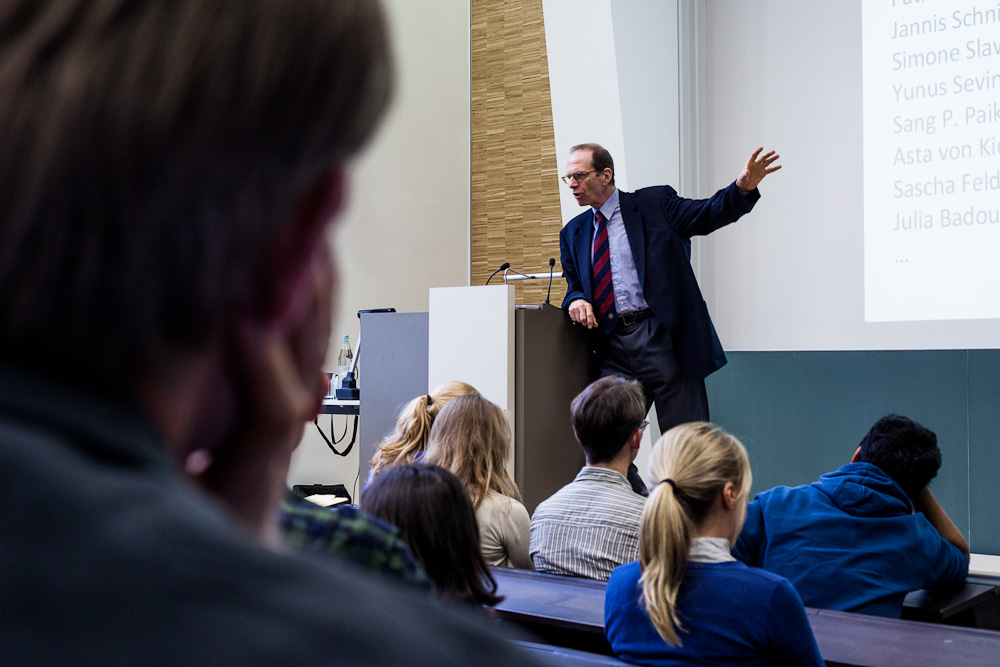
Reinhard Zimmermann (2013)

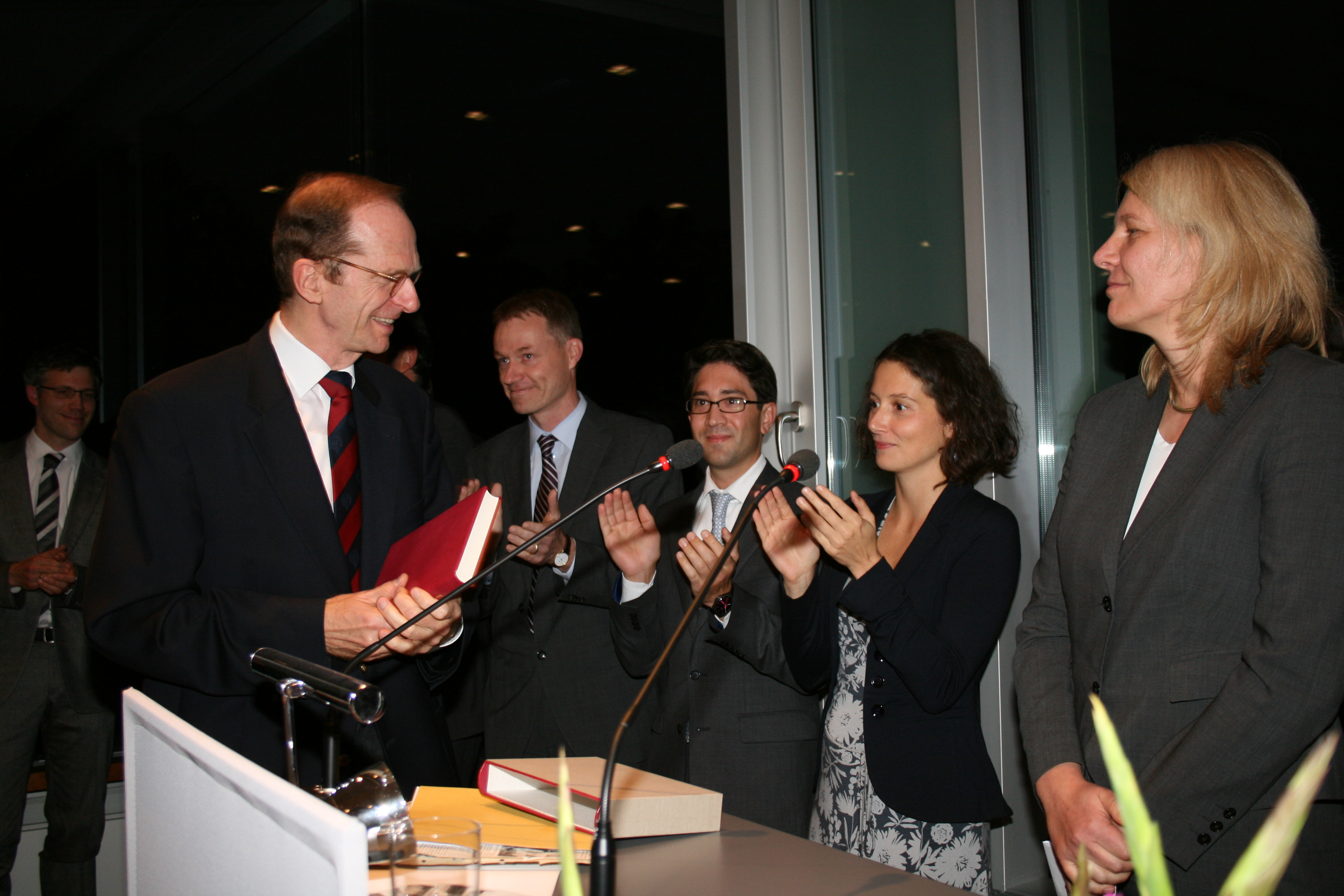
Reinhard Zimmermann, 60th birthday, academic celebration (left rear: Martin Illmer; right beside Zimmermann: Dirk Verse, Walter Doralt, Alexandra Braun, Sonja Meier)

Reinhard Zimmermann (born 10 October 1952) is a German law professor and retired Director at the Max Planck Institute for Comparative and International Private Law in Hamburg. From 2011 to 2023 he was President of the German Academic Scholarship Foundation (Studienstiftung des deutschen Volkes).

== Life ==
Reinhard Zimmermann studied law and obtained a doctoral degree in law at the University of Hamburg while working as an assistant of Hans Hermann Seiler. After having passed his professional State Examination in law in 1979, he worked for a year with Jens Peter Meincke at the University of Cologne. In 1981 Zimmermann accepted an offer to become the W.P. Schreiner Professor of Roman and Comparative Law at the University of Cape Town (South Africa). In 1988 he returned to Germany and became Professor of German Private Law, Roman Law and Comparative Legal History at the University of Regensburg. In 2002 he became Academic Member of the Max Planck Society and Director at the Max Planck Institute for Comparative and International Private Law in Hamburg (he retired in October 2022). In addition, since 2008 Zimmermann is affiliated as a professor to the Bucerius Law School in Hamburg, and since 2014 he is Honorary Professor at the University of Edinburgh. From 2006 to 2010 he was Chairman of the Humanities Division of the Max Planck Society, from 2006 to 2023 he was a member of the Senate of the Max Planck Society.

Since his time at the University of Regensburg, Zimmermann has held visiting professorships at the University of Edinburgh, Stellenbosch University, the University of New Orleans, the University of Chicago (Max Rheinstein Chair), Berkeley, Yale, the University of Auckland, and the University of Santiago. In 1998/99 he was A.L. Goodhart Professor of Legal Science at the University of Cambridge, and became Fellow of St. John's College; in 2006 he was Visiting Fellow at All Souls College, Oxford (to which he remained affiliated as a Member of Common Room until 2019).

Zimmermann was a member of the “Lando Commission” which drafted Part III of the Principles of European Contract Law; he was also a member of the Working Group that revised and extended the UNIDROIT Principles of International Commercial Contracts, and of the Working Group jointly appointed by the German Federation and its individual states to prepare the modernization of the German law of obligations.

Since 2003 Zimmermann is the coordinator of a circle of colleagues recommending legal books of the year. These recommendations are published every year in the Juristenzeitung.

From 2002 Reinhard Zimmermann was a member of the Board, from 2011 to 2015 Chairman of the Society of University Teachers of Private Law (Zivilrechtslehrervereinigung). From 2014 to 2022 he was Chairman of the Society for Comparative Law (Gesellschaft für Rechtsvergleichung).

Together with Irmgard Griss (President of the Austrian Supreme Court), Zimmermann chaired the Founding Committee of the European Law Institute; in 2011 he was appointed as Senator of the European Law Institute; since 2017 he is the Speaker of its Senate.

Reinhard Zimmermann has been closely associated with the German Academic Scholarship Foundation – first as a student, later as a mentor, from 2004 as member and deputy chairman of its supervisory board (Kuratorium). From 2011 to 2023 he was President of the German Academic Scholarship Foundation. On the occasion of the end of his term of office the Foundation dedicated a booklet to him under the title “Begabung und Verantwortung” (Talent and Responsibility: Essays, Documents, and Milestones from 12 years of presidency).

In his trilogy of novels “The 2 ½ Pillars of Wisdom “ (which gently mocks the German professor, as symbolized in the figure of Moritz-Maria von Igelfeld) the Scottish author Sir Alexander McCall Smith has used experiences and recollections of his friend Reinhard Zimmermann; the first volume (“Portuguese Irregular Verbs”) is dedicated to him. The first three volumes re-appeared in 2005 under the title “The 2 ½ Pillars of Wisdom”. The fourth volume (“Unusual Uses of Olive Oil”) appeared in 2011, the fifth volume (“Your Inner Hedgehog”) in 2021. How this series originated has been described by McCall Smith in his contribution to Iurium Itinera (2022): “The Story of a Friendship”.

== Main Fields of Research ==
Law of obligations and law of succession in historical and comparative perspective; relationship between the English common law and continental civil law; mixed legal systems (in particular Scotland and South Africa); harmonization of European private law.

== Impact ==
Reinhard Zimmermann became internationally known with his work "The Law of Obligations: Roman Foundations of the Civilian Tradition" (1990/1996). It is based on a combination of legal history and comparative law which provides a key to understanding the commonalities and differences of our modern systems of private law. This way of thinking has significantly influenced the discussions surrounding European private law far beyond Germany. The English comparative lawyer Tony Weir refers to Zimmermann's book as “a work of an altogether novel kind. … no previous book is at all like it”.

The status of standard works is also generally attributed to the “Oxford Handbook of Comparative Law”, edited by Zimmermann jointly with Mathias Reimann, and the “Max Planck Encyclopedia of European Private Law”, edited by Zimmermann with Jürgen Basedow and Klaus J. Hopt.

Inspired by his time in Cape Town and his close connection with the University of Edinburgh, Zimmermann has also pioneered the historical and comparative study of mixed legal systems at the intersection between common law and civil law.

Zimmermann's international impact has also been enhanced by his Clarendon Lectures at the University of Oxford (published under the title “Roman Law, Contemporary Law, European Law: The Civilian Tradition Today”, 2001). In those lectures Zimmermann elucidates his approach relating to legal history, comparative law, and modern legal doctrine. “This is an awe-inspiringly dense volume, packed with thought-provoking insights, and delivered with a voice of tremendous authority“ (Law Quarterly Review, 118 (2002), 153).

Among Zimmermann's other works which have found international acclaim, is the volume “Jurists Uprooted”, edited by him jointly with Jack Beatson. It analyses life, work, and impact of German-speaking legal scholars who, in the 1930s, had to emigrate to Great Britain. “Everyone”, as Marcus Lutter states, “who immerses himself in this book, puts it down both ashamed and deeply enriched. … The richness of the book lies in the just about incredible care and precision of its authors who, throughout, combine their essays with a history of the development of their respective discipline. … The book contains … at the same time legal history and a history of ideas of the 20th century".

A project which Zimmermann initiated and edited together with Nils Jansen, has led to the publication, in 2018, of the “Commentaries on European Contract Laws”. “To put it very briefly”, as the editors write in their foreword, “we want to trace the development of European contract law, as reflected in the model rules from PECL to the CESL, and in the European consumer acquis ...; and we want to assess that development against its broadly conceived historical and comparative background. We thus hope that our book, by giving a comprehensive and balanced account of where we stand today, as well as suggestions where we might want to go in the future, can serve as a point of both orientation and of departure.“ Apart from Jansen and Zimmermann, 20 younger scholars have contributed to this project, among them 15 from the circle of Zimmermann's academic pupils.

Since 2007 Reinhard Zimmermann, together with his friends and colleagues Marius de Waal (who died in 2022) and Kenneth Reid, directs an international research group on the law of succession in historical and comparative perspective which has, in the meantime, produced four books. A further volume (on the administration of estates) is in preparation, to be published in 2024. With this and a number of other initiatives, Zimmermann aims to deliver the law of succession from the status of Cinderella of academic scholarship which has been its lot since the days of codification. Recently, together with eight young colleagues from his Institute, he has published a detailed reform proposal concerning the law of mandatory family protection. It aims to replace the “compulsory portion” of German law by a model focusing on maintenance claims.

== Criticism ==
Zimmermann's historical-comparative vision and particularly his “Law of Obligations” have met with great international acclaim but have also, occasionally, attracted criticism. Ugo Mattei describes Zimmermann's approach, just as the one pursued by Friedrich Carl von Savigny at the beginning of the 19th century, as “thoroughly ethnocentric, conservative, class-privileged (and) self-serving”. Zimmermann, and his supporters, “by use of biased historiography, pursue a defence of the status quo in the professional-legal leadership in Europe”; this defence, Mattei writes, is directed against the ascendancy of US-American legal culture. Pio Caroni referred to Zimmermann in 1994 as “neo-pandectist”. The Italian Legal Historian and Constitutional Court judge Paolo Grossi stated: “I’m terrified when some modern Roman law scholar digs out of his magician’s hat obsolete Roman law tools in the secret ... hope to conquer a title of honour in the building of the future uniform European law and to gain a right of citizenship in the future European paradise.”

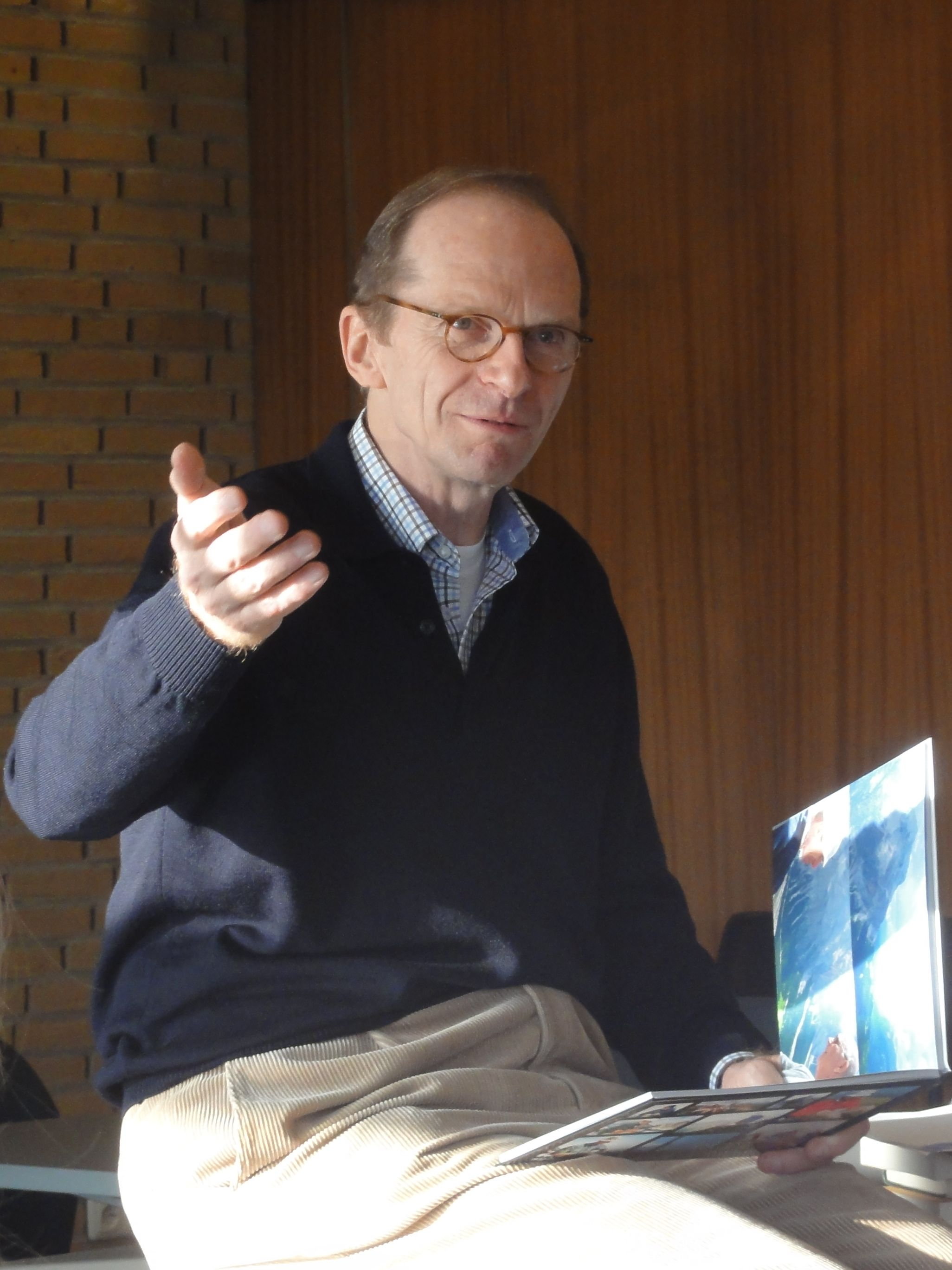
Reinhard Zimmermann

This criticism was soon exposed as being based on a simplistic misunderstanding. Thus, for example, David Ibbetson wrote: “For all the diversity that exists within the European legal tradition, at the root of it there is a substantial unity. Legal historians might quibble about the precise balance between diversity and unity, but none would deny the truth of Professor Zimmermann’s basic proposition … [T]his is not just a rehash of the ultra-simplistic proposition that continental European legal systems are based on Roman law as a result of some sort of crude borrowing of Roman rules. It is more that, as a matter of historical observation, continental European legal systems have developed by the progressive adaptation of Roman law principles to changing circumstances, repeatedly taking advantage of the elasticity and potential for growth present within these principles themselves. It is not far-fetched to project this forward too: as we move towards a European private law, it is not unreasonable to suppose that it is through the continuation of this process of the adaptation of Roman principles that this will be achieved.” In the meantime, Grossi himself appears to have changed his mind. Vehement repudiation has become replaced by strong support for Zimmermann's work. In a similar vein, the Belgian authors Dirk Heirbaut and Mathias Storme write: “[I]n 1990 Reinhard Zimmermann delivered a general wake up call in his famous book about the law of obligations. Suddenly, law professors all over Europe started to become interested in creating … a new common law of Europe. … Some caution may be justified here. Many have taken the wrong message from Zimmermann’s work: Europe had one law in the past and it should have one law again in the future. … (In reality) the lawyers of the ius commune had a common legal culture not a common law, and what Zimmermann wants is a re-Europeanization of legal scholarship, a new common legal science and legal culture. The rest can follow later and that may take some time.”

== Honours and Prizes ==
In 1996 Zimmermann was awarded the Gotttfried Wilhelm Leibniz Prize of the German Research Association (Deutsche Forschungsgemeinschaft). The Accademia dei Lincei in Rome awarded him, in 2023, the Premio Antonio Feltrinelli. Zimmermann is only the fifth legal scholar to whom this prize, founded in 1950, has been given. In 2018, he received the Medal of Honour of the University of Cologne, and in 2024 the Federal President conferred the Order of Merit of the Federal Republic of Germany on Zimmermann.

The following universities have awarded the degree of doctor of laws honoris causa to Zimmermann: Chicago (1997), Aberdeen (2002), Maastricht (2005), Lund (2006), Cape Town (2006), Edinburgh (2007), Lleida (2007), Stellenbosch (2009), McGill (2010), Catholic University of Lublin John Paul II (2021), Universidad de Chile (2022).

The award of the honorary doctorate by the University of Cape Town was made also in recognition of Zimmermann's contribution towards the restoration of the rule of law in a South Africa emerging from the apartheid system.

Zimmermann is Ordinary Member of the Göttingen Academy of Sciences and Humanities and the Academia Europaea. He is also a Corresponding Fellow of the British Academy and of the Royal Society of Edinburgh as well as a Corresponding Member of the Bavarian Academy of Arts and Sciences, and a Foreign Member of the Royal Netherlands Academy of Arts and Sciences, the Accademia delle Science di Torino, and the Austrian Academy of Sciences.

Zimmermann's academic pupils presented to him in 2022 a special issue of RabelsZ (the Rabel Journal for Comparative and International Private Law) with historical-comparative essays. On the occasion of his retirement as director at the Max Planck Institute, which coincided with his 70th birthday, his academic pupils dedicated to him the volume “Iurium itinera: Historical Comparative Law and Comparative Legal History”, Mohr Siebeck, 2022. It contains 48 contributions, analyzing legal problems in various fields of private law in a historical-comparative perspective; they are written by authors who have worked with Zimmermann or under his supervision, and thus regard themselves as members of his “academic family”.

Among Zimmermann's academic pupils teaching today at German-speaking Universities, are Nils Jansen (Münster), Sonja Meier (Köln), Stefan Vogenauer (Frankfurt), Jens Kleinschmidt (Trier), Phillip Hellwege (Augsburg), Sebastian Martens (Passau), Birke Häcker (Bonn), Hartmut Wicke (München), Walter Doralt (Graz), Gregor Christandl (Graz), Johannes Liebrecht (Zürich), Jan Peter Schmidt (Hamburg), and Ben Köhler (Bayreuth).

== Publications (Selection) ==
(Source:)

=== Editorial activity ===
Zimmermann is co-founder and co-editor of the Zeitschrift für Europäisches Privatrecht (since its founding; C.H. Beck) and "Comparative Studies in Continental and Anglo-American Legal History" (Duncker & Humblot) (originally jointly with Helmut Coing, Richard Helmholz, and Knut Wolfgang Nörr). He was (until 2022) co-editor of the "Schriften zur Europäischen Rechts- und Verfassungsgeschichte" (Duncker & Humblot), "Studien zum ausländischen und internationalen Privatrecht" (Mohr Siebeck), and of "Rabels Zeitschrift für ausländisches und internationales Privatrecht".

=== Books ===
- The Law of Obligations: Roman Foundations of the Civilian Tradition, Oxford University Press, 1996, ISBN 0-19-876426-X.
- Itinera Fiduciae: Trust und Treuhand in Historical Perspective, Duncker & Humblot, 1998, ISBN 3-428-09614-2 (ed. together with Richard Helmholz).
- Good Faith in European Contract law, Cambridge University Press 2000, ISBN 0-521-77190-0 (ed. together with Simon Whittaker).
- Roman Law, Contemporary Law, European Law: The Civilian Tradition Today, Oxford University Press, 2001, ISBN 0-19-829913-3.
- Comparative Foundations of a European Law of Set-Off and Prescription, Cambridge University Press, 2002, ISBN 0-521-81461-8.
- Mixed Legal Systems in Comparative Perspective, Oxford University Press, 2004, ISBN 0-19-927100-3 (ed. together with Daniel Visser and Kenneth Reid).
- Historisch-kritischer Kommentar zum BGB, Mohr Siebeck, Band I 2003, ISBN 3-16-147909-2, Band II 2007, ISBN 3-16-149376-1, Band III 2013, ISBN 978-3-16-150528-7, Band IV 2018, ISBN 978-3-16-156399-7 (ed. together with Joachim Rückert and Matthias Schmoeckel).
- The New German Law of Obligations: Historical and Comparative Perspectives, Oxford University Press, 2005, ISBN 0-19-929137-3.
- Jurists Uprooted: German-speaking Émigré Lawyers in Twentieth-century Britain. Oxford University Press, 2005, ISBN 0-19-927058-9 (ed. together with Jack Beatson).
- The Oxford Handbook of Comparative Law, Oxford University Press, 2006, ISBN 0-19-953545-0 (ed. together with mit Mathias Reimann); 2nd ed. 2019, ISBN 978-0-19-881023-0.
- Handwörterbuch des Europäischen Privatrechts, Mohr Siebeck, 2009, ISBN 3-16-149918-2 (ed. together with Jürgen Basedow and Klaus J. Hopt).
- Revision des Verbraucher-acquis, Mohr Siebeck, 2011, ISBN 978-3-16-150902-5 (together with Horst Eidenmüller, Florian Faust, Hans Christoph Grigoleit, Nils Jansen and Gerhard Wagner).
- Comparative Succession Law, Band 1: Testamentary Formalities, Oxford University Press, 2012, ISBN 978-0-19-969680-2 (ed. together with Kenneth Reid and Marius de Waal).
- The Max Planck Encyclopedia of European Private Law, Oxford University Press, 2012, ISBN 978-0-19-957895-5 (ed. together with Jürgen Basedow and Klaus J. Hopt).
- Judge and Jurist: Essays in Memory of Lord Rodger of Earlsferry, Oxford University Press, 2013, ISBN 978-0-19-967734-4 (ed. together with Andrew Burrows und David Johnston).
- Comparative Succession Law, Band 2: Intestate Succession, Oxford University Press, 2015, ISBN 978-0-19-874712-3 (ed. together with Kenneth G.C. Reid and Marius J. de Waal).
- Commentaries on European Contract Laws, Oxford University Press, 2018, ISBN 978-0-19-879069-3 (ed. together with Nils Jansen).
- Juristische Kommentare: Ein internationaler Vergleich, 2020, ISBN 978-3-16-158338-4 (ed. together with David Kästle-Lamparter and Nils Jansen).
- Comparative Succession Law, Band 3: Mandatory Family Protection, Oxford University Press, 2020, ISBN 978-0-19-885039-7 (ed. together with Kenneth G.C. Reid and Marius de Waal).
- Zwingender Angehörigenschutz im Erbrecht, Mohr Siebeck, 2022, ISBN 978-3-16-161708-9 (together with Franz Bauer, Martin Bialluch, Andreas Humm, Lisa-Kristin Klapdor, Ben Köhler, Jan Peter Schmidt, Philipp Scholz and Denise Wiedemann).

=== Articles in law review ===
- „Heard Melodies are sweet, but those unheard are sweeter ...“ – Condicio tacita, implied condition und die Fortbildung des europäischen Vertragsrechts, Archiv für die civilistische Praxis 193 (1993), 121 – 173.
- Der europäische Charakter des englischen Rechts, Zeitschrift für Europäisches Privatrecht 1 (1993), 4 – 50.
- Unjustified Enrichment: The Modern Civilian Approach, Oxford Journal of Legal Studies 15 (1995), 403 – 429.
- Savigny's Legacy: Legal History, Comparative Law, and the Emergence of a European Science, Law Quarterly Review 1996, 576 – 605.
- „In der Schule von Ludwig Mitteis“, Ernst Rabels rechtshistorische Ursprünge, Rabels Zeitschrift für ausländisches und internationales Privatrecht 2001, 1 – 38.
- Europa und das römische Recht, Archiv für die civilistische Praxis 202 (2002), 243 - 316.
- The Present State of European Private Law, American Journal of Comparative Law 2009, 479 – 512.
- Codification: The Civilian Experience Reconsidered on the Eve of a Common European Sales Law, European Review of Contract Law 8 (2012), 367 – 399.
- Der Vorschlag für eine Verordnung über ein gemeinsames Europäisches Kaufrecht, Juristenzeitung 2012, 269 – 289 (gemeinsam mit Horst Eidenmüller, Nils Jansen, Eva-Maria Kieninger und Gerhard Wagner).
- Testamentsformen: Willkür oder Ausdruck einer Rechtskultur?, Rabels Zeitschrift für ausländisches und internationales Privatrecht 2012, 471 – 508.
- Challenges for the European Law Institute, Edinburgh Law Review 2012, 5 – 23.
- Das Verwandtenerbrecht in historisch-vergleichender Perspektive, Rabels Zeitschrift für ausländisches und internationales Privatrecht 79 (2015), 768 – 821.
- Das Ehegattenerbrecht in historisch-vergleichender Perspektive, Rabels Zeitschrift für ausländisches und internationales Privatrecht 80 (2016), 39 – 92.
- Kulturelle Prägung des Erbrechts?, Juristenzeitung 2016, 321 – 332.
- Pflichtteil und Noterbenrecht in historisch-vergleichender Perspektive, Rabels Zeitschrift für ausländisches und internationales Privatrecht 84 (2020), 465 - 547.
- "So jemand die Seinen, sonderlich seine Hausgenossen, nicht versorget, ...": Zum Schutz der Angehörigen im Erbrecht, Archiv für die civilistische Praxis 222 (2022), 3 - 55.
- Legal Methodology in Germany, Edinburgh Law Review 26 (2022), 153 - 193.
- Das englische Erbrecht als Ausprägung europäischer Rechtskultur, Zeitschrift für Europäisches Privatrecht 31 (2023), 290 - 325.

=== Contributions to "Festschriften" ===
- „Cy-près“, in: Iuris Professio, Festgabe für Max Kaser, 1986, 395–415.
- Effusum vel deiectum, in: Festschrift für Hermann Lange, 1992, 301–330.
- Quieta movere: Interpretative Change in a Codified System, in: Peter Cane, Jane Stapleton (Hg.), The Law of Obligations: Essays in Celebration of John Fleming, 1998, 285–315 (gemeinsam mit Nils Jansen).
- Vertrag und Versprechen, Deutsches Recht und Principles of European Contract Law im Vergleich, in: Festschrift für Andreas Heldrich, 2005, 467–484.
- Innkeepers’ liability – Die Entwicklung der Gastwirtshaftung in England, in: Festschrift für Claus-Wilhelm Canaris, 2007, 1435–1466.
- Erbunwürdigkeit–Die Entwicklung eines Rechtsinstituts im Spiegel europäischer Kodifikationen, in: Festschrift für Helmut Koziol, 2010, 463–511.
- „Nemo ex suo delicto meliorem suam condicionem facere potest“: Kränkungen der Testierfreiheit des Erblassers – englisches im Vergleich zum kontinentaleuropäischen Recht, in: Festschrift für Klaus J. Hopt, 2010, 269–302.
- Die Auslegung von Verträgen: Textstufen transnationaler Modellregelungen, in: Festschrift für Eduard Picker, Mohr Siebeck, 2010, 1353–1373.
- “Unworthiness” in the Roman Law of Succession, in: Andrew Burrows, David Johnston und Reinhard Zimmermann (Hg.), Judge and Jurist: Essays in Memory of Lord Rodger of Earlsferry, Oxford University Press, 2013, 325–344.
- „Sind wir aber Kinder, so sind wir auch Erben, nämlich Gottes Erben und Miterben Christi“: Zur Bedeutung der Rede von Erbe und Erbschaft in der Bibel, in: Zivilrecht und Steuerrecht, Erwerb von Todes wegen und Schenkung: Festschrift für Jens Peter Meincke, 2015, S. 435–450.
- Die Verjährung – von den Principles of European Contract Law bis zum Entwurf eines Gemeinsamen Europäischen Kaufrechts: Textstufen transnationaler Modellregeln, in: European Union Law, National Private Law, European Private Law: Essays in Honour of Arthur Hartkamp, European Review of Private Law 24 (2016), 687 – 726.
- The Thirtieth, in: Festschrift für Christian von Bar, 2022, 419 - 434.
- Erbrechtssysteme im Vergleich: in: Festschrift für Martin Henssler, 2023, 1803–1824.

=== Literature on Reinhard Zimmermann ===
- Stephan Mittelsten Scheid, Reinhard Zimmermann und das römisch-kanonische Recht als Grundlage einer europäischen Zivilrechtsordnung, in: Thomas Hören (Hrsg.), Zivilrechtliche Entdecker, C.H. Beck, 2001, ISBN 3-406-47962-6, S. 411–442.
- Vaquer, Antoni (Hrsg.): European private law beyond the common frame of reference: Essays in honour of Reinhard Zimmermann, European Law Publishing 2008, ISBN 978-90-76871-93-6.
- Die Berge lehren Demut, Welt am Sonntag vom 23. September 2012, S. 46, Interview mit Reinhard Zimmermann.
- Zu Ende gedacht, Forschung und Lehre 2012, S. 871, Interview mit Reinhard Zimmermann (PDF; 7,4 MB).
- Beiträge von Lord Jonathan Mance, Heinz-Peter Mansel, Alexander McCall Smith und Wolfgang Schön, in: Iurium itinera: Historische Rechtsvergleichung und vergleichende Rechtsgeschichte, Mohr Siebeck, 2022, ISBN 978-3-16-161486-6, S. 3–26.
- Nils Jansen, Reinhard Zimmermann zum 70. Geburtstag, Juristenzeitung 2022, 1108 f.
- Reinhard Zimmermann 70, FAZ vom 8. Oktober 2022, S. 23.
- Daniel Visser, Teaching under the Jackboot 1960–1990, in: The University of Cape Town Law Faculty: A History 1859–2004, University of Cape Town Publication 2004, ISBN 1-920025-04-9, S. 92–105.
- 50 Jahre Universität Regensburg, Universitätsverlag Regensburg, 2017, ISBN 978-3-86845-148-1, S. 84 f.
- Die Re-Europäisierung des Privatrechts, in: Jahrbuch der Max-Planck-Gesellschaft 2003, München 2003, ISBN 3-598-24930-6, S. 95–96.
- Von märchenhafter Freiheit: 25 Jahre Spitzenforschung im Gottfried Wilhelm Leibniz-Programm, Deutsche Forschungsgemeinschaft, 2010, ISBN 978-3-932306-98-3, S. 151.
- Rodrigues Junior, Otavio Luiz. Reinhard Zimmermann na Faculdade de Direito do Largo São Francisco, 2014. (conjur.com.br)
- Rodrigues Junior, Otavio Luiz; Rodas, Sergio. Interview with Reinhard Zimmermann and Jan Peter Schmidt. Journal of Contemporary Private Law – Revista de Direito Civil Contemporâneo. N. 2. v. 4. pp. 379–413. São Paulo: Ed. RT, jul.-set. 2015 (academia.edu).
