= Rudden =

Rudden is a surname. Notable people with the surname include:

Notable people with the surname include:

- Adam Rudden, an Irish poet
- Bernard Rudden (1933–2015), a British legal scholar
- Dave Rudden, an Irish writer of young adult literature, juvenile fantasy and science fiction
- Stephen Rudden, a British musician, former member of Love City Groove in the mid-1990s
- Zak Rudden, a Scottish professional footballer
