= Professor of Comparative Law =

Professor of Comparative Law may refer to:

- Professor of Comparative Law (Oxford) at the University of Oxford, formerly the Linklaters Professor of Comparative Law
- Quain Professor of Comparative Law at University College London, now known as the Quain Professor of Jurisprudence
