= Peter Landau =

German jurist, legal historian and expert on canon law

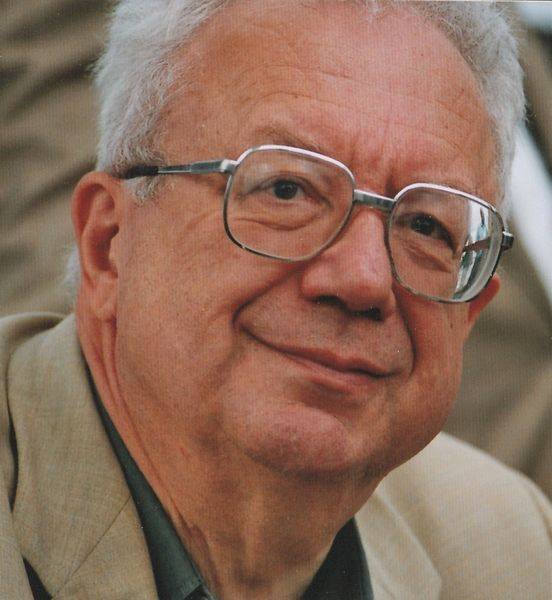

Peter Landau (26 February 1935 – 23 May 2019) was a German jurist, legal historian and expert on canon law.

== Biography and career ==
After going to school in Berlin, where he was born, and Eisenberg, Thuringia, Landau studied law, history, and philosophy at the Free University of Berlin, at University of Freiburg, and University of Bonn. After graduating, he served as the assistant of Stephan Kuttner at Yale University. After his doctoral promotion in 1964 and a habilitating in 1964, Landau accepted a call to University of Regensburg where he became a regular professor. In 1970/71 he served as Prorector of that university and in 1978/79 he was the Dean of the faculty of law. His career included research at University of California, Berkeley (1977) and a lecturer's post as a visiting professor at University of Chicago (1984). In 1985, he was accepted into the Bavarian Academy of Sciences and Humanities. When Landau rejected calls to Goethe University Frankfurt and University of California, Berkeley, he became professor of German legal history, recent history of private law, church law, civil law, and for philosophy of law and politics at LMU Munich. This office included the post as director of the Leopold Wenger Institute for Ancient Legal History and Papyrus Research. While in Munich, Landau served also as the dean of the Legal Faculty from 1993 to 1995.

In 1990/91 Landau visited the Institute for Advanced Study in Princeton, New Jersey. He was president of the Society for Medieval Canon Law at Zurich, Switzerland, from 1988 to 2000 and since 1993 he was a member of the advisory board of the Max Planck Institute for European History of Law at Frankfurt am Main. He was also president of the Stephan Kuttner Institute of Medieval Canon Law. According to the Bulletin of Medieval Canon Law, Landau was considered a renowned expert on canon law worldwide and mostly worked on medieval church law, and evangelical church law. He was moreover interested in philosophy of law and political philosophy. Landau held honorary doctorates of the Institute of Canon Law at LMU Munich, of University of Basel and Panthéon-Assas University.

Landau's research areas outside the narrower subject also included the Communist and first Bavarian Prime Minister Kurt Eisner (USPD). Landau called for the Münchner Promenadeplatz to be renamed Kurt-Eisner-Platz.

== Publications ==
- Landau, Peter (1966). Die Entstehung des kanonischen Infamiebegriffs von Gratian bis zur Glossa ordinaria, Forschungen zur kirchlichen Rechtsgeschichte und zum Kirchenrecht [On the origin of the canonical term of infamy from Gratian to the Glossa ordinaria] (in German). Vol. 5. Cologne, Vienna.
- — (1975). Ius Patronatus. Studien zur Entwicklung des Patronats im Dekretalenrecht und der Kanonistik des 12. und 13.Jahrhunderts [Ius patronatus. Studies on the development of patronate in decretal law and canon law of the 12th and 13th century]. Forschungen zur kirchlichen Rechtsgeschichte und zum Kirchenrecht (in German). Vol. 12. Cologne, Vienna.
- —; Schroeder, Friedrich-Christian, eds. (1984). Strafrecht, Strafprozeß und Rezeption. Grundlagen, Entwicklung und Wirkung der Constitutio Criminalis Carolina [Criminal law, criminal proceeding and reception. Basics, development and impact of the Constitutio Criminalis Carolina]. Juristische Abhandlungen (in German). Vol. 19.
- — (1997). Kanones und Dekretalen. Beiträge zur Geschichte der Quellen des kanonischen Rechts [Canones and decretals. Contributions to the history of sources of canon law]. Bibliotheca Eruditorum (in German). Vol. 2. Goldbach. (see: decretal)
- —; Müller, Jörg, eds. (1997). Proceedings of the 9th International Congress of Medieval Canon Law, Munich, July 13–18, 1992. Vatican City.
- —; Nehlsen, Hermann, eds. (2000). Große jüdische Gelehrte an der Münchener Juristischen Fakultät [Great Jewish Scholars at the Munich Faculty of Law]. Abhandlungen zur Rechtswissenschaftlichen Grundlagenforschung (in German). Vol. 84. Juristische Fakultät. Ludwig-Maximilians-Universität München.
- —; Rieß, R., eds. (2004). Recht und Politik in Bayern zwischen Prinzregentenzeit und Nationalsozialismus [Law and Politics in Bavaria from the Time of the Prince Regent to National Socialism]. Abhandlungen zur rechtswissenschaftlichen Grundlagenforschung (in German). Vol. 91.
- Weigand, R.; Landau, P.; Kozur, W., eds. (2004). "Magistri Honorii Summa 'De iure canonico tractaturus' I" [How to advance Canon Law]. Monumenta Iuris Canonici, Ser. A (in Latin). 5. Vatican City.
