= Laboratory of Nano and Quantum Engineering =

Nanotechnology research centre in Germany

The Laboratory of Nano and Quantum Engineering (LNQE) is an interdisciplinary research center for nanotechnology of the Leibniz University Hannover in Germany.

== Goals ==
The Laboratory of Nano and Quantum Engineering (LNQE) is an interdisciplinary research center of the Leibniz Universität Hannover in the field of nanotechnology. Substantive goals are both excellent basic research as well as application-oriented engineering at the nanoscale accompanied by appropriate cross-disciplinary training. To achieve its objectives the LNQE has its own research building in Hannover, with laboratories, equipment, etc., and especially clean rooms.

== Members ==
The LNQE comprises currently 34 research groups from physics, chemistry and engineering of the Leibniz University Hannover. It is led at least by an executive board of four members which nominate a speaker from their middle. The executive board is supported by the LNQE-Office.

Location overview of the participating members/institutes with Google-Maps.

== Research ==
The collective term nanotechnology describes the study and manipulation of objects at smallest sizes. In general, the nanotechnology deals with structures ranging in size from 1-100 nanometers in at least one spatial direction. 100 nanometers are roughly one-thousandth of the diameter of a normal human hair. With these small dimensions surface properties come to the fore compared with the bulk properties of materials and also often quantum effects has to be taken into account. Nanotechnology is the technology of small things with new features and functionalities.

Nano engineering is the engineering on the nanoscale, i.e., the selective artificial fabrication of nanotechnology structures such as tiny transistors on computer chips. With nano engineering the closely related term quantum engineering aims to produce and manipulate a defined quantum state, such as the realization of a Bose-Einstein condensate or an electronic device with adjusted electron spin. The size of such systems is also often in the nanometer range.

Nanomaterials of various shapes, composition and size in the nanometer range are produced and analyzed in the laboratory. Nanoparticles have due to their small size special chemical and physical properties that differ significantly from the properties of macroscopic particles and solids. The cause therefore is the large ratio of surface to volume of the nanoparticles, so that they strongly interact with their environment. Added where appropriate quantum mechanical effects.

The artificially created structures and materials are investigated in a wide variety and analyzed. The analysis in the nanometer range requires variety and latest equipment and techniques. The necessary technological equipment is centrally located in the LNQE research building and is complemented by the equipment in the institutions.

== Education ==
Activities in education:

- Colloquium series
- Workshop NanoDay: a one-day workshop, which shows the broad spectrum of nanotechnology of the LNQE with talks and a poster session. This annual event takes place since 2005.
- Study course nanotechnology: bachelor course and master course at the Leibniz University Hannover.
- PhD-programme "Hannover School for Nanotechnology".

== Scientific New Build LNQE ==
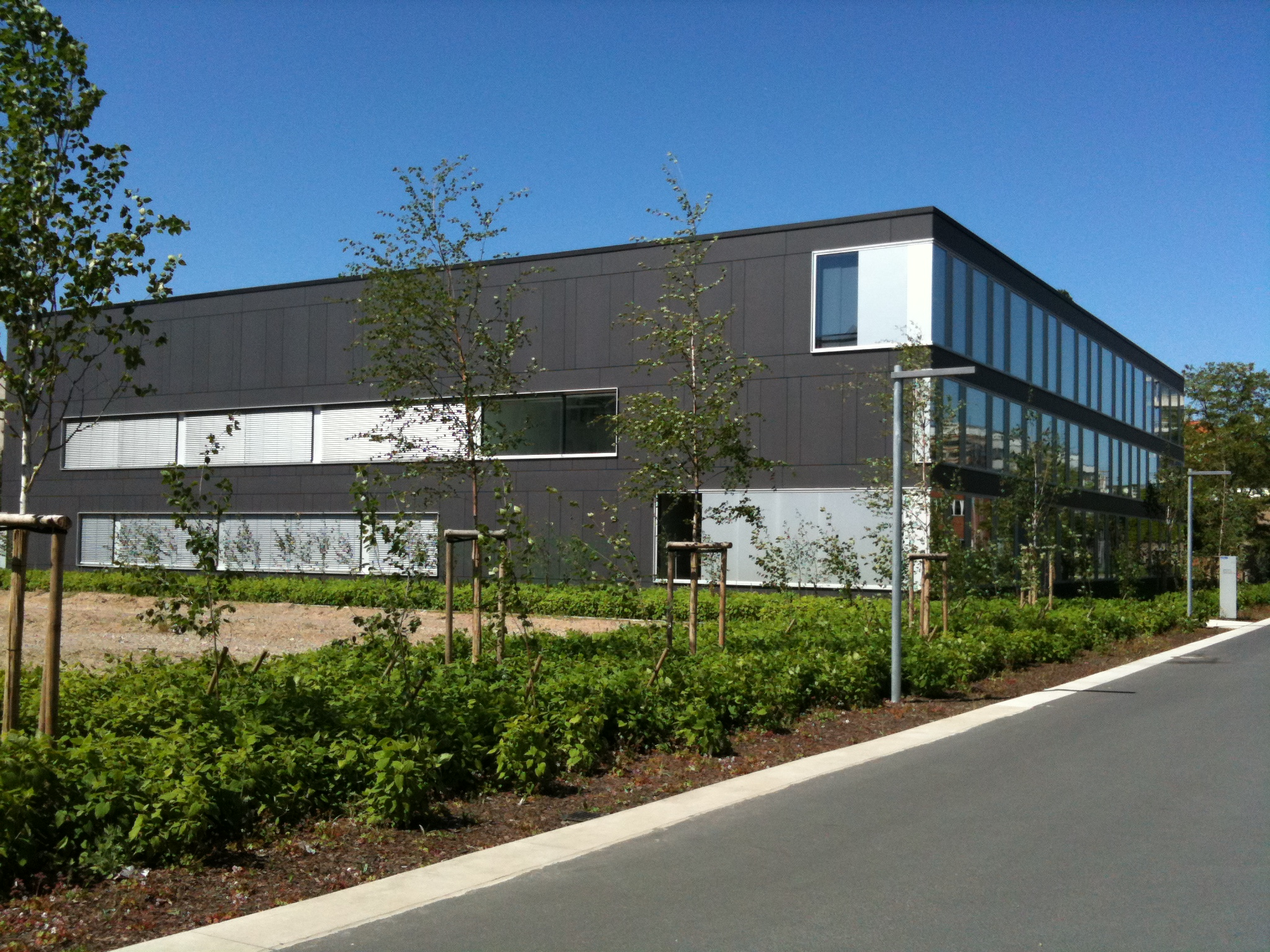
LNQE-Forschungsbau, Schneiderberg 39, 30167 Hannover, Germany.

The scientific new build stands in the middle of the Nordstadt, the university area of Hannover/Germany, at Schneiderberg 38, 30167 Hannover, Germany. The scientific building has 430 m^{2} of chemical, measurement and laser laboratories. 410 m^{2} are a research clean room and 509 m^{2} are workrooms for 44 staff members. The costs are approximately €14 million. After successful evaluation by the German Wissenschaftsrat, it gets federal grants. The project management was done by public project management Hannover; the planning was done by the architecture office KSP Jürgen Engel. The building was opened in November 2009.
