= Harry Lawson (legal scholar) =

British legal scholar

Frederick Henry Lawson, FBA (14 July 1897 – 15 May 1983), published as F. H. Lawson, was a British legal scholar. He was Professor of Comparative Law at the University of Oxford from 1948 to 1964.

== Biography ==
Lawson was born in Leeds, the son of a merchant. He was educated at Leeds Grammar School and The Queen's College, Oxford, where he was Hastings Exhibitioner in Classics. From 1916 to 1918 he served in an anti-aircraft regiment. After the war, he read Modern History instead, taking a First in 1921. The following year he took another First in Jurisprudence, and was called to the bar by Gray's Inn in 1923.

In 1925 he was elected a Junior Research Fellow at Merton College, Oxford. He was appointed University Lecturer in Byzantine Law in 1929, elected an Official Fellow and Tutor in Law at Merton in 1930, and appointed All Souls Reader in Roman Law in 1931. Between 1943 and 1945 he was a temporary Principal in the Ministry of Supply. In 1947 he became an Oxford DCL. In 1948 he became the first Professor of Comparative Law, and moved from Merton to Brasenose College, Oxford. He retired from Oxford in 1964. In retirement he taught at Lancaster University.

== Honours ==
Lawson received honorary doctorates from Louvain, Paris, Ghent, Frankfurt, Glasgow and Lancaster. He was elected a Fellow of the British Academy (FBA) in 1956.

== Personal life ==
In 1933, Lawson married Elspeth Webster. Together they had four children; three daughters and a son. After his retirement from Oxford, he moved to Eden Park Road, Lancaster, Lancashire (when he was teaching at Lancaster University).
