= Bernard Rudden =

British scholar (1933–2015)

Bernard Anthony Rudden, FBA (21 August 1933 – 4 March 2015) was a British legal scholar. He was the Professor of Comparative Law at the University of Oxford from 1979 to 1999.

== Early life and education ==
Rudden was born on 21 August 1933 in Carlisle, Cumbria, England. He was educated at a local primary school in Carlisle, and then at City of Norwich School, then an all-boys grammar school in Norwich. He learned Russian at school, and this led to his National Service being spent, according to his The Times obituary, with the "intelligence services deciphering Russian communications". He was called up to the British Army in 1951, and attended the Joint Services Russian Course, first in Cambridge and then in Bodmin when the school moved to Cornwall. Having completed his training and gaining a reasonable level of Russian, he was posted to the Intelligence Corps depot at Maresfield, East Sussex, where he specialised in the Soviet Union.

 I just want to clarify some details. Bernard went to Cambridge to learn Russian, at the same time as I, at the start of 1952.
After one year the language course continues at Bodmin. The material had a military bias, but did not involve actual intelligence work. After 6 months, having three months of NS still to go, we were moved to Maresfield, where we studied Soviet matters, but did not produce any actual work. Demob came at the beginning of September. Bernard's Russian was quite good, but not at the highest level of the course! Liscaraig

In 1953, having completed his National Service, Rudden matriculated into St John's College, Cambridge. He originally studied English literature with the aim of becoming a poet, but after two years he switched to law. Having graduated with a Bachelor of Arts (BA) degree, he began training as a solicitor. Having qualified, he worked as a solicitor in Norwich for a time, before returning to academia.

== Academic career ==
Having left behind legal practice, Rudden was appointed an assistant lecturer in law at the University College of Wales, Aberystwyth. During this time, he also studied for a Doctor of Philosophy (PhD) degree in Soviet tort law, which was awarded to him by the University of Wales. In 1965, he moved to the University of Oxford, where he was elected fellow and tutor in law at Oriel College, Oxford. In 1979, he was selected to become the next Professor of Comparative Law at the University of Oxford in succession to Barry Nicholas. This chair meant that he had to move college, and he became a fellow of Brasenose College, Oxford. He retired from Oxford in 1999.
