= Birke Häcker =

German legal scholar (born 1977)

- Born: 1977 (age 48–49)

Academic background
- Education: Brasenose College, Oxford; University of Bonn
- Thesis: Consequences of Impaired Consent Transfers: A Structural Comparison of English and German Law (2007)

Academic work
- Discipline: Law
- Sub-discipline: Comparative law; private law; English law; German law
- Institutions: All Souls College, Oxford; LMU Munich; Max Planck Institute for Tax Law and Public Finance; Faculty of Law, University of Oxford; Brasenose College, Oxford

Birke Häcker (born 1977) is a German legal scholar. Since January 2023 she has been Professor for Civil Law, Common Law and Comparative Law at the University of Bonn and Director of the Institute for International and Comparative Private Law at the University of Bonn. From 2016 to 2022, she was the Professor of Comparative Law at the University of Oxford and a Professorial Fellow of Brasenose College, Oxford.

== Early life and education ==
Häcker was born in 1977. She studied law at Brasenose College, Oxford, graduating with a Bachelor of Arts (BA) degree in 2001. She then studied at the University of Bonn, where she completed a Diplom-Jurist (Dipl-Jur) degree in 2004. That year, she also sat and passed the 1st German State Examination in Law. Having returned to Oxford, she completed her Doctor of Philosophy (DPhil) degree in 2007. Her doctoral thesis was titled "Consequences of Impaired Consent Transfers: A Structural Comparison of English and German Law". She sat and passed the 2nd German State Examination in Law in 2011.

== Academic career ==
From 2001 to 2008, Häcker held an elected Examination Fellowship of All Souls College, Oxford. From 2008 to 2016, she was a research associate and then lecturer in law at LMU Munich in Germany. She was also a Senior Research Fellow at the Max Planck Institute for Tax Law and Public Finance in Munich, and a Fifty-Pound Fellow at All Souls College, Oxford, between 2011 and 2016.

In December 2015, it was announced that Häcker would be the next Linklaters Professor of Comparative Law at the University of Oxford in succession to Stefan Vogenauer. She took up the appointment on 1 September 2016. She was additionally so elected a Professorial Fellow in law at Brasenose College, Oxford in 2016.

She is an Honorary Bencher of Lincoln's Inn and an elected member of the Academia Europaea.

In 2023, she moved to the University of Bonn, where she holds a Schlegel "Excellence" Chair.

== Personal life ==
Häcker is married to Tobias Reker. Together they have one daughter.

== Selected works ==
- Häcker, Birke (2009). Consequences of Impaired Consent Transfers: A Structural Comparison of English and German Law. Tübingen: Mohr Siebeck. ISBN 978-3-16-149790-2.
- Elliott, Steven; Häcker, Birke; Mitchell, Charles, eds. (2014). Restitution of Overpaid Tax. Oxford: Hart Publishing. ISBN 978-1-78225-122-4.
- Häcker, Birke; Mitchell, Charles, eds. (2016). Current Issues in Succession Law. London: Bloomsbury Publishing. ISBN 978-1-78225-628-1.
- Häcker, Birke; Ernst, Wolfgang, eds. (2020). Collective Judging in Comparative Perspective: Counting Votes and Weighing Opinions. Cambridge: Intersentia Publishing. ISBN 978-1-78068-624-0.
- Häcker, Birke; Ungerer, Johannes, eds. (2025). Default Rules in Private Law. London: Bloomsbury Publishing. ISBN 978-1-50997-352-1.

Academic offices
Preceded by Stefan Vogenauer	Linklaters Professor of Comparative Law; University of Oxford; 2016 to 2022	Succeeded by Lionel Smith
