= Barry Nicholas =

British legal scholar

John Keiran Barry Moylan Nicholas (6 July 1919 – 3 March 2002) was a British legal scholar. He was Professor of Comparative Law at the University of Oxford from 1971 to 1978, and Principal of Brasenose College, Oxford, from 1978 to 1989.

== Early life ==
Nicholas was born on 6 July 1919 to Archibald John Nicholas and Rose (née Moylan). He was educated at Downside School, a Catholic private school in Somerset, England. He then matriculated into Brasenose College, Oxford, where he studied classics. In 1939, he achieved first class honours in Literae Humaniores. After taking a leave to serve in World War II, he returned to study jurisprudence, graduating with a first class Bachelor of Arts in 1946.

== Academic career ==
Nicholas began teaching at Brasenose College in 1946, and he served as its principal from 1978 to 1989. He gave up the position at the appointed age of 70, but he did not retire. Additionally, he served as reader in Roman Law at All Souls College from 1949 to 1971 and Professor of Comparative Law at the University of Oxford from 1971 to 1978.

Nicholas' An Introduction to Roman Law is a standard text in the study of Roman law.

Upon Nicholas' death on 3 March 2002, Peter Birks memorialized his work on behalf of the British Academy.

Academic offices
Preceded by H. L. A. Hart	Principal of Brasenose College, Oxford; 1978-1989	Succeeded by David Windlesham
