= Marie Theres Fögen =

German jurist and historian

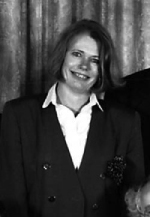
Fögen in 1992

Marie Theres Fögen (10 October 1946 in Lüdinghausen, West Germany – 18 January 2008 in Zürich, Switzerland) was a German jurist and historian. She taught law at the University of Zurich and Harvard University (as visiting professor) and was director of the Max Planck Institute for European History of Law in Frankfurt am Main.
