= Professor of Comparative Law (Oxford) =

Professorship at the University of Oxford

The Professorship of Comparative Law is a chair in law at the University of Oxford. The current holder of the chair is Lionel Smith.

The chair was founded as the Professorship of Comparative Law in 1948 and was the first chair of comparative law created in the United Kingdom. The chair is linked with a Professorial Fellowship at Brasenose College, Oxford. In 2013, the chair was renamed from Professorship of Comparative Law to Linklaters Professorship of Comparative Law "in recognition of Linklaters' support for Law in Oxford". After the funding arrangement expired at the end of 2017, the chair reverted to its original name on 1 January 2018.

== List of Professors of Comparative Law ==
Professor of Comparative Law

- 1948 to 1964: F. H. Lawson
- 1964 to 1971: Otto Kahn-Freund
- 1971 to 1978: Barry Nicholas
- 1979 to 1999: Bernard Rudden

Clifford Chance Professor of Comparative Law

- 1999 to 2000: Basil Markesinis

Linklaters Professor of Comparative Law

- 2003 to 2015: Stefan Vogenauer
- 2016 to 2017: Birke Häcker

Professor of Comparative Law

- 2018 to 2022: Birke Häcker
- 2024 to present: Lionel Smith
