= German Science and Humanities Council =

German educational advisory body

- Formation: September 5, 1957; 68 years ago
- Headquarters: Berlin
- Chairman: Wolfgang Wick
- Website: https://www.wissenschaftsrat.de/

The German Science and Humanities Council (Wissenschaftsrat, WR) is an advisory body to the German Federal Government and the federal state governments. It makes recommendations on the development of science, research, and the universities, as well as on the competitiveness of German science. These recommendations involve both quantitative and financial considerations, as well as their implementation. Funding is provided by the federal and state governments.

The Science and Humanities Council's Scientific Commission has 32 members appointed by the Federal President. Twenty-four scientists are jointly proposed by the German Research Foundation, the Max Planck Society for the Advancement of Science, the German Rectors' Conference, the Helmholtz Association of German Research Centres, the Fraunhofer Society, and the Gottfried Wilhelm Leibniz Scientific Community. Another eight persons of high public standing are jointly proposed by the Federal Government and the federal state governments.

== Tasks ==
In the recent past, the German Council of Science and Humanities expressed its views in its statements, recommendations, and position papers on various topics, including university construction (2022), the transformation of scientific publishing to Open Access (2022), and science communication (2021). In 2020, it published the position paper "Impulses from the COVID-19 Crisis for the Further Development of the Science System in Germany," which described ten challenges for research to be crisis-proof. In 2019, it called for more funds for peace and conflict studies. In the same year (2019), it issued a statement on the further development of university medicine in North Rhine-Westphalia. In 2016, the Council produced a position paper on knowledge and technology transfer. In 2015, in a position paper titled "Major Societal Challenges" internationally referred to as societal challenges or grand challenges, it called for the "integration and flexible recombination of knowledge on ecological, technological, social, cultural, and economic aspects of a transformation process."

== Presidents ==
Presidents (Vorsitzender) of the organization:

- 1958–1961 – Helmut Coing
- 1961–1965 – Ludwig Raiser
- 1965–1969 – Hans Leussink
- 1969–1972 – Reimar Lüst
- 1972–1976 – Theodor Heidhues
- 1976–1979 – Wilhelm A. Kewenig
- 1979–1982 – Andreas Heldrich
- 1982–1985 – Hans-Jürgen Engell
- 1985–1987 – Heinz Heckhausen
- 1987–1989 – Kurt Kochsiek
- 1989-1993 – Dieter Simon
- 1993–1994 – Gerhard Neuweiler
- 1994–1996 – Karl-Heinz Hoffmann
- 1996–1998 – Dagmar Schipanski
- 1998–2001 – Winfried Schulze
- 2001–2006 – Karl Max Einhäupl
- 2006–2011 – Peter Strohschneider
- 2011–2014 – Wolfgang Marquardt
- 2014–2017 – Manfred Prenzel
- 2017–2020 – Martina Brockmeier
- 2020–2023 – Dorothea Wagner
- 2023–present – Wolfgang Wick

== See also ==
- Educational accreditation in Germany
