= Helmut Coing =

German legal scholar

Helmut Coing (28 February 1912 – 15 August 2000) was a German legal historian. His work focused on the history of European private law, especially in the Middle Ages, legal history in Germany and the philosophy of law.

== Life and career ==
Helmut Coing came from a Huguenot family of civil servants. After graduating from the Ratsgymnasium in Hanover, he studied law at Kiel University, the Ludwig-Maximilians-Universität München, the University of Göttingen and the University of Lille. In 1935, he received his Dr. jur. promoviert. He then moved to the Goethe University Frankfurt, where he habilitated in 1938 with Erich Genzmer. He passed his bar examination in 1939. In August of that year, reserve officer Coing was drafted into the Wehrmacht, in which he served until 1945, attaining the rank of a reserve captain and divisional adjutant. In 1941, Coing became professor of Roman and civil law at the University of Frankfurt am Main. He remained unaffected during the National Socialist period and after his return from Allied captivity in 1946 he was appointed professor of civil and Roman law at the re-established University of Frankfurt am Main. He also taught philosophy of law there. He visited apartheid South Africa after the war. He joined Friedrich Hayek's Mont Pelerin Society in 1951.

As rector of the University of Frankfurt am Main for the academic years 1955/56 and 1956/57, Coing took on organizational and operational tasks in the scientific community for the first time and became chairman of the West German Rectors' Conference in 1956–1957 and, after his replacement as university rector, co-founding chairman of the Science Council (1958–1960). In 1961, he became the chairman of the scientific council of the Fritz Thyssen Foundation, established two years prior, and exercised this function as late as 1978/79. In 1964 Coing founded the Max Planck Institute for European Legal History in Frankfurt and remained its director until his retirement in February 1980. He also sat on the Juridical Committee of the European Banking Federation, set up in 1960. In 1968 he was elected a corresponding member of the Göttingen Academy of Sciences and the Bavarian Academy of Sciences. In 1972, he became a corresponding fellow of the British Academy. From 1970 to 1973 he was chairman of the humanities section of the Max Planck Society and from 1970 to 1972 he was also head of the Statutes Commission and finally 1978 to 1984 Vice President of the Max Planck Society. He held a visiting fellowship at All Souls College, Oxford. In 1984 Coing, who had already been inducted into the Pour le Mérite for Sciences and Arts in 1973, was elected Chancellor of the Order. He held this post until 1992.

== Awards and legacy ==
In 1958 Coing was awarded the Goethe Plaque by the city of Frankfurt am Main. In 1966, he became an Officer of the French Legion of Honour. In 1973, he became a member of the Order Pour le Mérite for Science and the Arts. A year later he was awarded the Great Cross of Merit with Star of the Federal Republic of Germany. In 1990, he received the Commander's Cross of the Order of Merit of the Republic of Italy and in the same year the Great Federal Cross of Merit with Star and Ribbon and the Hessian Order of Merit. He was awarded honorary doctorates awarded by the universities of Lyon (1959), Montpellier (1959), Vienna (1965), Aberdeen (1968), Brussels (1975) and Uppsala (1977).

Coing proposed the notion of the "European legal tradition" in a 1967 article and elaborated it in 1985.

In 2008, the Max Planck Institute for European Legal History in Frankfurt am Main awarded the Helmut Coing Prize for the first time. The award is intended to give young researchers the opportunity to work at the institute for 4 to 5 months to complete a dissertation or post-doctoral thesis that deals with an area of European legal history. The scholarship is advertised worldwide every three years.

A path on the Westend campus was named after him.
