= Michael Stolleis =

German jurist and historian (1941–2021)

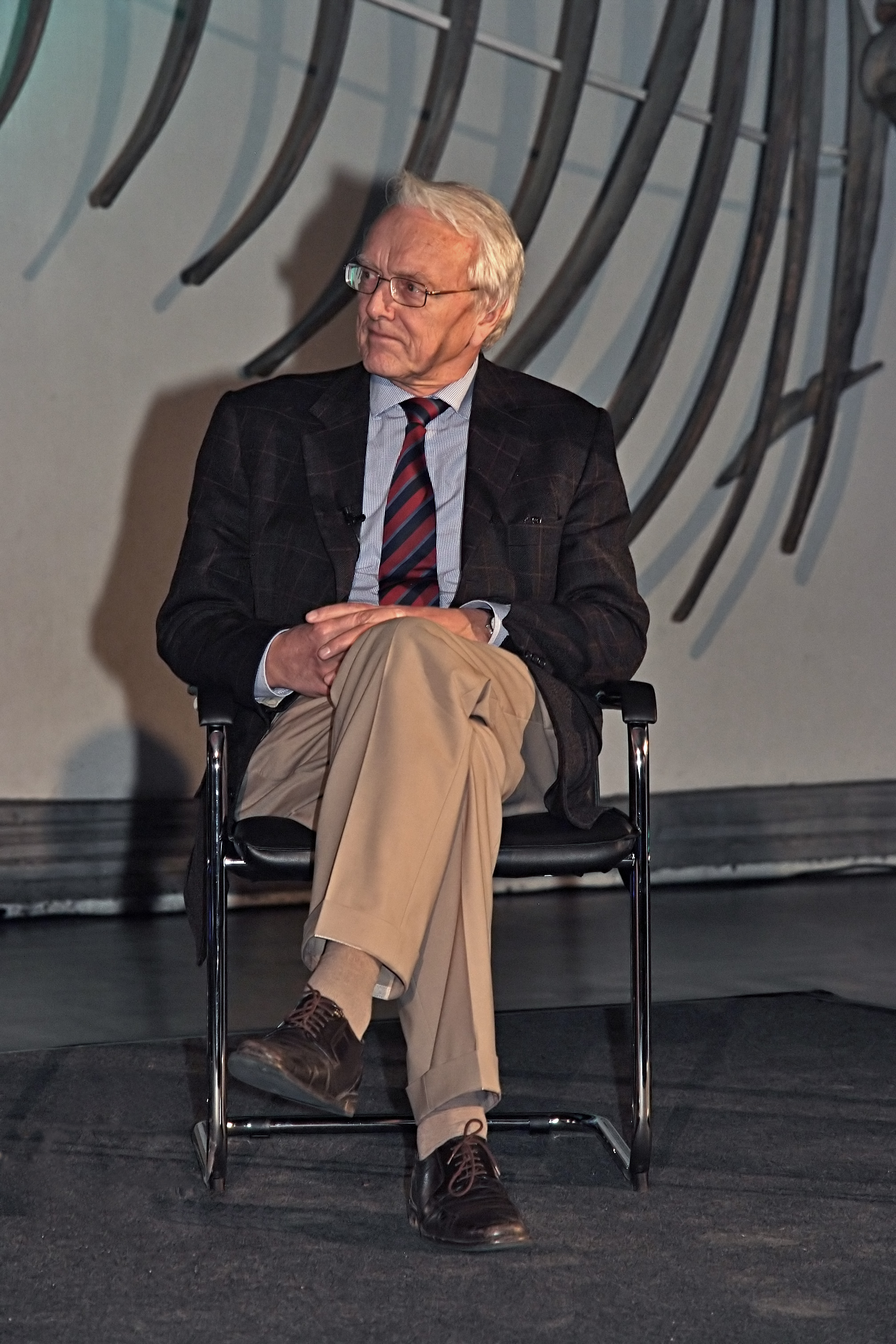
- Stolleis in 2009
- Born: 20 July 1941; Ludwigshafen, Germany
- Died: 18 March 2021 (aged 79); Frankfurt, Germany
- Occupations: Jurist; Historian

Michael Stolleis (20 July 1941 – 18 March 2021) was a German jurist and historian. He was a law professor at Goethe University Frankfurt until 2006 and directed the Max Planck Institut für Europäische Rechtsgeschichte of the Max Planck Society from 1991 to 2009.

== Biography ==
Michael was the son of Erich Stolleis, who served as Mayor of Ludwigshafen from 1937 to 1942. After his secondary studies, he studied law, German literature, and art history at Heidelberg University and the University of Würzburg. He passed his Staatsexamen in 1965 and finished his doctoral thesis at LMU Munich, titled Staatsraison, Recht und Moral in philosophischen Texten des späten 18. Jahrhunderts.

In 1991, Stolleis received the Leibniz Prize for being an "exceptional academic", awarded by the German Research Foundation. That same year, he was appointed Director of the Max Planck Institut für Europäische Rechtsgeschichte of the Max Planck Society. In 2006, he became a professor emeritus at Goethe University Frankfurt and retired as director of the MPI for the History of European Law of the Max Planck Society, but returned, as acting director, from 2007 to 2009.

In 2015, Stolleis became a Grand Officer of the Order of Merit of the Federal Republic of Germany. He was awarded the Pour le Mérite order for Sciences and Arts in 2014.

Michael Stolleis died in Frankfurt on 18 March 2021 at the age of 79.

== Awards ==
- Hegel Prize (2018)

== Bibliography ==
- Staatsraison, Recht und Moral in philosophischen Texten des späten 18. Jahrhunderts (1972)
- Gemeinwohlformeln im nationalsozialistischen Recht (1974)
- Pecunia nervus rerum: Zur Staatsfinanzierung in der frühen Neuzeit (1983)
- Geschichte des öffentlichen Rechts in Deutschland (1988–2012)
  - Band 1: Reichspublizistik und Policeywissenschaft 1600–1800 (1988)
  - Band 2: Staatsrechtslehre und Verwaltungswissenschaft 1800–1914 (1992)
  - Band 3: Staats- und Verwaltungsrechtswissenschaft in Republik und Diktatur 1914–1945 (1999)
  - Band 4: Staats- und Verwaltungsrechtswissenschaft in West und Ost 1945–1990 (2012)
- Staat und Staatsraison in der frühen Neuzeit: Studien zur Geschichte des öffentlichen Rechts (1990)
- Recht im Unrecht: Studien zur Rechtsgeschichte des Nationalsozialismus (1994) (translated as The Law under the Swastika)
- Konstitution und Intervention: Studien zur Geschichte des öffentlichen Rechts im 19. Jahrhundert (2001)
- Geschichte des Sozialrechts in Deutschland: Ein Grundriss (2003)
- Das Auge des Gesetzes: Geschichte einer Metapher (2004)
- Sozialistische Gesetzlichkeit. Staats- und Verwaltungsrechtswissenschaft in der DDR (2009)
- Ausgewählte Aufsätze und Beiträge (2011)
- Öffentliches Recht in Deutschland. Eine Einführung in seine Geschichte. 16.–21. Jahrhundert (2014)
- Nahes Unrecht, fernes Recht. Zur Juristischen Zeitgeschichte im 20. Jahrhundert (2014)
