= Stefan Vogenauer =

German legal scholar (born 1968)

Stefan Vogenauer FBA
- Born: 4 August 1968 (age 58); Eutin, Schleswig-Holstein, Germany
- Occupation: Legal scholar

Academic background
- Education: Trinity College, Oxford (MJur)

Stefan Vogenauer (born 4 August 1968 in Eutin) is a German legal scholar who is the director of the Max Planck Institute for European Legal History. He was previously Linklaters Professor of Comparative Law at the University of Oxford.

Vogenauer’s research focuses primarily on comparative law, European legal history, transnational commercial law, and legal methodology. His further research interests include legal transplants between common law jurisdictions and the legal history of the European Union.
