= Stephan Kuttner =

American legal scholar

Stephan George Kuttner (24 March 1907 in Bonn – 12 August 1996 in Berkeley), an expert in Canon Law, was recognized as a leader in the discovery, interpretation and analysis of important texts and manuscripts that are key to understanding the evolution of legal systems from Roman law to modern constitutional law.

== Biography ==
Born in Bonn, Germany, into a family of Jewish ancestry, Kuttner was raised as a Lutheran and converted to Roman Catholicism in 1932. He received his law degree from Berlin University in 1931, where he was a classmate and friend of the legal historian Hsu Dau-lin. Two years later he fled Nazi Germany for Italy, where he worked as a research fellow at the Vatican Library and taught at the Lateran University in Rome. In 1940, he immigrated to the United States with his young family. He was a professor at Washington, D.C.'s Catholic University of America from 1940 to 1964, where a chair in canon law is named in his honor. While there, Kuttner lectured to the Riccobono Seminar. At Yale University he was the first occupant of the T. Lawrason Riggs Chair of Catholic Studies, which he held for five years. Thereafter he became the first Director of the Robbins Collection in Roman and Canon Law in the University of California, Berkeley School of Law (1970–1988), and continued as Emeritus Professor of Law until his death.

Kuttner had a large family and at the time of his death was survived by his wife, Eva (née Illch), eight of nine children, twenty grandchildren, 14 great-grandchildren and a sister. Eva Kuttner died on November 14, 2007.

== Works ==
To organize the field of textual scholarship in medieval canon law he founded the Institute of Medieval Canon Law in 1955, which he presided over for 25 years and which now is affiliated with LMU Munich and bears his name. He also launched a series of international congresses in medieval canon law, the tenth of which was in session at the time of his death. He was appointed by Pope Paul VI to serve on the initial Commission for the Reform of the Code of Canon Law. Kuttner also founded the publishing series Monumenta Iuris Canonici and the journal Bulletin of Medieval Canon Law. The latter originally appeared in the journal Traditio, before becoming an independent journal.

The author of many scholarly works, Kuttner received numerous academic awards and honors in the U.S. and abroad. He held honorary degrees from Cambridge, Paris, Bologna and Salamanca universities and was a member of the American Academy of Arts and Sciences, the Institut de France and the American Philosophical Society. Kuttner was recognized for his life's work by his 1969 induction into the prestigious Order Pour le Mérite, Germany's highest honor to bestow on artists, scholars, and scientists.

An accomplished pianist, he also composed music, wrote and translated poetry, and corresponded widely in several languages. In 1990, his Missa Brevis, written for 16 vocal parts, was performed by The Boston Cecilia.

The Library of the Stephan Kuttner Institute of Medieval Canon Law has Kuttner's extensive Collection of scholarly off-prints as well as his scholarly correspondence. A database of these titles is now available at the institute. In the future the database might be accessible on the Internet.

== Books by Stephan Kuttner ==
- Die juristische Natur der falschen Beweisaussage. Ein Beitrag zur Geschichte und der Systematik Eidesdelikte, zugleich Beschränkung einer zur Frage auf der Strafbarkeit erhebliche Falsche Aussagen. Berlin 1931.
- Kanonistische Schuldlehre von Gratian bis auf die Dekretalen Gregors IX.: Systematisch auf Grund der Quellen handschriftlichen dargestellt. Città del Vaticano 1935.
- Repertorium der Kanonistik (1140-1234). Prodromus corporis glossarum. Cittá del Vaticano 1937.
- A Catalogue of Canon and Roman Law Manuscripts in the Vatican Library. Vatican City 1986-, ISBN 88-210-0540-2
- Gratian and the Schools of Law, 1140–1234. London 1983, ISBN 0-86078-133-X
- Harmony from Dissonance, an Interpretation of Medieval Canon Law. Wimmer Lecture 10. St. Vincent's, Latrobe, Pa; 1960. (No ISBN)
- Pope Urban II: The Collectio Britannica, and the Council of Melfi (1089). Robert Somerville with the collaboration of Stephan Kuttner. Oxford 1996, ISBN 0-19-820569-4
- Studies in the History of Medieval Canon Law. Aldershot 1990, ISBN 0-86078-274-3

== Sources ==
- Horst Fuhrmann : Stephan Kuttner: Canon Law as Theory of Harmony. In trans. humans and merits. A personal portrait gallery. Munich 2001, pp. 220–230, ISBN 3-406-47221-4.
- Horst Fuhrmann: Obituary Stephan Kuttner. In: German archive for research of the Middle Ages 53 (1997), pp. 411–413.
- Andreas Hetzenecker: Stephan Kuttner in America 1940–1964. Foundation of the modern historical-canonical research. Berlin 2007, ISBN 3-428-12225-9.
- Barbara Wolf Dahm: Stephan Kuttner. In: Biographic-bibliographic church encyclopedia (BBKL). Volume 4, Bautz, Herzberg, 1992, ISBN 3-88309-038-7, 533-533 Sp.
- Raoul C. Van Caenegem: Legal historians I have known: a personal memoir. In: History of Law, Journal of the Max Planck Institute for European Legal History, vol 17 (2010), pp. 253–299.
