= List of corresponding fellows of the British Academy =

The Fellowship of the British Academy consists of world-leading scholars and researchers in the humanities and social sciences. A varying number of fellows are elected each year in July at the Academy's annual general meeting. Corresponding fellows are "scholars outside the UK who have 'attained high international standing in any of the branches of study which it is the object of the Academy to promote'." Up to 20 may be elected each year.

== List ==
Elected	Name	Country	Title or Section
1904	Count Ugo Balzani	Italy	
1904	Professor H. Diels	Germany	
1904	M. le Comte de Franqueville	France	
1904	Professor M. J. de Goeje	Holland (Netherlands)	
1904	Professor I. Goldziher	Hungary	
1904	Professor T. Gomperz	Austria	
1904	Professor J. L. Heiberg	Denmark	
1904	Professor K. Krumbacher	Germany	
1904	Professor F. Leo	Holland (Netherlands)	
1904	M. Paul Meyer	France	
1904	M. Georges Perrot	France	
1904	M. Georges Picot	France	
1904	Professor C. H. Salemann	Russia	
1907	M. Émile Boutroux	France	
1907	M. Leopold Delisle	France	
1907	Professor Basil L. Gildersleeve	United States	
1907	Professor Adolf Harnack	Germany	
1907	Professor Harald Høffding	Denmark	
1907	Mr Justice Holmes	United States	
1907	Professor William James	United States	
1907	Professor Frederick de Martens	Russia	
1907	Professor Karl Eduard Sachau	Germany	
1907	Professor Ulrich von Wilamowitz-Möllendorff	Germany	
1909	Mr. H. C. Lea	United States	
1909	Dr. F. Liebermann	Germany	
1909	Don Marcelino Menendez y Pelayo	Spain	
1909	His Excellency M. Louis Renault	France	
1909	Professor E. Sievers	Germany	
1909	The Prince of Teano	Italy	
1910	Monseigneur Duchesne	France	
1910	Professor Kittredge	United States	
1910	Professor Dr. Edward Meyer	Germany	
1910	M. Senart	France	
1910	Professor Dr. D. Ernst Windisch	Germany	
1911	M. Henri Bergson	France	
1911	His Excellency M. Jusserand	France	
1911	M. Salomon Reinach	France	
1911	Mr. F. J. Rhodes	United States	
1913	Professor F. K. Brugmann	Germany	
1913	Professor Dr. Otto von Gierke	Germany	
1913	Professor Christian Snouck Hurgronje	Holland (Netherlands)	
1913	President A. Lawrence Lowell	United States	
1913	Professor Ernest Nys	Belgium	
1914	M. Charles Bémont	France	
1914	Mr. Charles W. Eliot	United States	
1914	M. H. Omont	France	
1914	Signor Pasquale Villari	Italy	
1916	Senatore Domenico Comparetti	Italy	
1916	Professor A. Croiset	France	
1916	M. F. Cumont	Belgium	
1916	M. Ernest Lavisse	France	
1916	His Excellency M. Ribot	France	
1916	The Hon. Elihu Root	United States	
1916	Professor Josiah Royce	United States	
1917	M. Charles Borgeaud	Switzerland	
1917	Professor Émile Cartaillac	France	
1917	President Arthur T. Hadley	United States	
1917	Professor Louis Havet	France	
1917	Professor Mikhail Rostovtsev	United States	
1918	Dr. J. Franklin Jameson	Washington	
1918	Professor B. M. Olsen	Iceland	
1920	Père Hippolyte Delehaye	Belgium	
1920	Professor Finnur Jónsson	Iceland	
1920	Dr Charles Lyon-Caen	France	
1920	President T. G. Masaryk	Czechoslovakia	
1920	Professor Ramón Menedez	Spain	
1920	Henri Cordier	France	
1920	Professor Pio Rajna	Italy	
1921	Professor Henri Pirenne	Belgium	
1922	Professor Remigio Sabbadini	Italy	
1923	Jean Capart	Belgium	
1923	Professor Otto Jespersen	Denmark	
1923	Professor Thadeys Zielinski	Poland	
1924	Professor Émile Legouis	France	
1925	Professor Francis William Taussig	United States	
1926	Professor Charles Homer Haskins	United States	
1926	Professor Ulrich Wilcken	Germany	
1927	Professor Étienne Gilson	France	
1927	Professor Ignazio Guidi	Italy	
1927	Professor Werner Jaeger	Germany	
1927	Professor Edward Kennard Rand	United States	
1928	Professor Wilhelm Geiger	Germany	
1928	Dr E. A. Lowe	Oxford	
1930	Professor C. R. Lanman	United States	
1931	Professor Halvdan Koht	Norway	
1931	Professor Einar Löfstedt	Sweden	
1931	Professor Paul Pelliot	France	
1931	Professor Adolf Wilhelm	Austria	
1932	Professor Adolf Erman	Germany	
1932	Professor Paul Lehmann	Germany	
1933	The Duke of Berwick and Alba	Spain	
1933	Professor O. Lenel	Germany	
1933	Père Vincent Scheil	France	
1934	Professor J. H. Breasted	United States	
1934	Professor Tenney Frank	United States	
1934	Professor Max Förster	Germany	
1935	Senatore Benedetto Croce	Italy	
1935	Professor R. Davidsohn	Germany	
1935	Professor F. Lot	France	
1936	Professor Jyun Takakusu	Japan	
1936	Professor J. Livingston Lowes	United States	
1936	Professor E. Husserl	Germany	
1936	Professor H. Lévy-Ullmann	France	
1936	Dr P. Jacobsthal	Germany	
1937	Professor J. Bidez	Belgium	
1937	Professor C. Diehl	United States	
1937	René Dussaud	France	
1937	Professor E. Ekwall	Sweden	
1937	Professor W. Kroll	Germany	
1938	Professor E. Bignone	Italy	
1938	Dr Paul Kehr	Germany	
1938	Emile Mâle	France	
1938	Professor Walter Otto	Germany	
1938	Professor L. Radermacher	Germany	
1938	Dr H. Shetelig	Norway	
1938	M. F. Thureau-Dangin	France	
1939	Alfred Foucher	France	
1939	Pierre Jouguet	France	
1939	Professor Martin Nilsson	Sweden	
1939	Père L. H. Vincent	France	
1940	Professor B. D. Meritt	Greece	
1940	Charles Petit-Dutaillis	France	
1940	Professor Roscoe Pound	United States	
1940	Professor A. M. Tallgren	Finland	
1941	Professor C. H. McIlwain	United States	
1941	Sir Ganganath Jha	India	
1941	Dr Paul Maas	Germany	
1942	Professor Campbell Bonner	United States	
1942	Professor W. S. Ferguson	United States	
1943	Professor V. F. Minorsky	Russia	
1943	Professor A. D. Nock	United States	
1944	Dom Henri Leclercq	Belgium	
1944	Professor E. V. Tarlé	Russia	
1944	Professor Tschen Yinkoh	China	
1945	Dr Felix Jacoby	Germany	
1946	Professor W. Koehler	Germany	
1946	Miss G. M. A. Richter	United States	
1946	Professor L. Robert	France	
1946	Claude Schaeffer	France	
1947	Dr A. Alföldi	Hungary	
1947	Professor F. Dvornik	Czech Republic	
1947	Professor E. Herzfeld	Germany	
1948	Professor K. Latte	Germany	
1948	Professor G. le Bras	France	
1948	Dr G. Lefebvre	France	
1948	Dr P. E. Legrand	France	
1948	Professor C. I. Lewis	United States	
1948	Professor H. A. Thompson	United States	
1949	Professor C. W. Blegen	United States	
1949	Professor W. B. Dinsmoor	United States	
1949	Georges Lefebvre	France	
1950	Professor A. Boëthius	Sweden	
1950	Père Paul Grosjean	Belgium	
1950	Professor Wallace Notestei	United States	
1950	Professor J. Pedersen	Denmark	
1951	Professor Brand Blanshard	United States	
1951	Emile Bréhier	France	
1951	Professor Franz Dölger	Germany	
1952	Professor J. Brøndsted	Denmark	
1952	Professor G. Coedès	France	
1952	Professor G. De Sanctis	Italy	
1952	Père A. J. Festugière	France	
1952	Professor P. Renouvin	France	
1952	Professor P. Toesca	Italy	
1953	Professor F. L. Ganshof	Belgium	
1953	Professor C. Høeg	Denmark	
1953	Professor J. Viner	Canada	
1954	Professor S. E. Morison	United States	
1954	Professor L. Pericot Garcia	Spain	
1954	Professor K. Reinhardt	Germany	
1954	Professor W. Schubart	Germany	
1955	Professor Rudolf Carnap	Germany/United States	
1955	Professor E. R. Curtius	Germany	
1955	Godfrey Davies	United States	
1955	Professor E. Panofiky	Germany	
1955	Henri Seyrig	France	
1956	Professor Harold F. Cherniss	United States	
1956	Claire Préaux	Belgium	
1956	Dr Albert Schweitzer	Germany	
1957	Professor Federico Chabod	Italy	
1957	Professor André Grabar	Russia/France	
1957	Professor Erik Lindahl	Sweden	
1958	Professor A. Degrassi	Italy	
1958	Professor O. Eissfeldt	Germany	
1958	Professor E. Perroy	France	
1958	Professor G. Sherburn	United States	
1958	Professor B. Snell	Germany	
1959	Professor V. Arangio-Ruiz	Italy	
1959	Professor V. N. Lasareff	Russia	
1959	Professor W. van Orman Quine	United States	
1959	Professor I. A. Richards	United Kingdom	
1959	Professor G. Tucci	Italy	
1960	Professor Gerhard Bersu	Germany	
1960	Professor Bernhard Bischoff	Germany	
1960	Professor J. N. D. Bush	United States	
1960	Professor P. A. Samuelson	United States	
1960	Professor S. E. Thorne	United States	
1961	Rev. Roland de Vaux	France	
1961	Professor Dr M. Gelzer	Switzerland/Germany	
1961	Professor Dr P. Geyl	Denmark	
1961	Professor Dr G. Klaffenbach	Germany	
1961	Professor Benno Landsberger	Germany	
1961	Professor François Perroux	France	
1961	Professor G. H. von Wright	Finland	
1962	Professor Fernand Braudel	France	
1962	Professor Dr Josef Keil	Czech Republic	
1962	Rev. Professor André Parrot	France	
1962	Professor H. C. Youtie	United States	
1962	Professor Viktor Zhirmunsky		
1963	Professor Kurt Bittel	Germany	
1963	Professor Ernest Nagel	United States	
1963	Professor Georgije Ostrogorsky	Russia	
1963	Professor Lily Ross Taylor	United States	
1964	Professor B. H. Bronson	United States	
1964	Professor Dr Wolfgang Clemen	Germany	
1964	Professor A. L. Corbin	United States	
1964	Professor Dr Wilhelm Ensslin	Germany	
1964	Professor R. Krautheimer	Germany	
1964	S. Kuttner	Germany	
1964	Professor R. M. MacIver	Scotland	
1964	Dr Georg Morgenstierne	Norway	
1964	Professor Y. Renouard	France	
1964	Professor Daniel Schlumberger	France	
1965	Professor Norberto Bobbio	Italy	
1965	Pierre Courcelle	France	
1965	Professor Tadeusz Kotarbiński	Poland	
1965	Professor Henri-Irénée Marrou	France	
1965	Professor Dr Willy Theiler	Switzerland	
1965	Professor Walther von Wartburg	Switzerland	
1965	Professor Kurt Weitzmann	Germany/United States	
1966	Don Dámaso Alonso	Spain	
1966	Marie-Thérèse D'Alverny	France	
1966	Professor Freiherr Hans Erich von Campenhausen	Germany	
1966	Professor Alonzo Church	United States	
1966	Professor Ragnar Frisch	Norway	
1966	Professor Dr Albin Lesky	Austria	
1966	Professor Claude Lévi-Strauss	France	
1966	Professor Hellmut Ritter	Germany	
1966	Professor Alfred Tarski	Poland/United States	
1966	Professor Yigael Yadin	Israel	
1967	Professor W. F. Albright		
1967	Professor Marcel Bataillon		
1967	Professor R. S. Crane		
1967	Professor W. D. Davies		
1967	Professor Herbert Heaton		
1967	Rev. Professor Hubert Jedin		
1967	Professor Hans Kelsen		
1967	Professor J. A. O. Larsen		
1967	Professor G. Levi Della Vida		
1967	Professor Carl Nordenfalk		
1967	Professor André Piganiol		
1967	Dr Boris Piotrovsky		
1967	Jacqueline de Romilly		
1967	Professor J. H. Waszink		
1968	Professor F. T. Bowers		
1968	Professor T. R. S. Broughton		
1968	Dr Alfonso Caso		
1968	Dr Enrico Cerulli		
1968	Professor Oscar Cullmann		
1968	Professor Nelson Goodman		
1968	Professor Bernhard Karlgren		
1968	Professor H. G. Pflaum		
1968	Professor J. C. Pope		
1968	Jacques Vandier		
1969	Professor Ekrem Akurgal		
1969	Professor Kurt Aland		
1969	Professor Paul Demiéville		
1969	Professor Alexander Gerschenkron		
1969	Professor G. S. Haight		
1969	Professor W. K. Jordan		
1969	Professor Ernst Kitzinger		
1969	Rev. Dom Jean Leclercq		
1969	Professor W. F. Libby		
1969	Professor Dr Tahsin Özgüç		
1969	Professor H. J. Polotsky		
1969	Professor Jean Pommier		
1969	l'Abbé M. A. C. Richard		
1969	Professor Hermann Strasburger		
1969	Professor Jan Tinbergen		
1969	Professor Paul Wittek		
1970	Professor Raymond Aron		
1970	Professor P. L. Chantraine		
1970	Professor J. P. Dawson		
1970	Sir Owen Dixon		
1970	Professor Georges Duby		
1970	Professor Mircea Eliade		
1970	Professor Richard Ettinghausen		
1970	Professor Jean Fabre		
1970	Professor H. F. Fränkel		
1970	Professor Albrecht Goetze		
1970	Professor Dr Werner Krämer		
1970	Professor Étienne Lamotte		
1970	Professor W. W. Leontief		
1970	Professor A. J. Marder		
1970	Professor Dr Kazimierz Michalowski		
1970	Professor Henri-Charles Puech		
1970	Professor J. A. van Houtte		
1970	Professor Franco Venturi		
1970	Professor Hao Wang		
1971	Dr C. I. Andersson		
1971	Dr G. E. H. Aulén		
1971	Professor L. Bieler		
1971	Professor G. Billanovich		
1971	Professor K. Bosl		
1971	Dr René Cassin		
1971	Professor R. Derolez		
1971	Professor Fritz Fischer		
1971	Professor Nils Herlitz		
1971	Professor S. N. Kramer		
1971	Professor W. Kunkel		
1971	Professor E. Kunze		
1971	Professor S. S. Kuznets		
1971	Professor E. Lundberg		
1971	Professor E. Molland		
1971	Professor R. Mousnier		
1971	Professor T. F. Mustanoja		
1971	Professor O. Neugebauer		
1971	Professor A. L. Oppenheim		
1971	Professor A. Orlandos		
1971	Professor R. A. Parker		
1971	Professor T. Parsons		
1971	Professor L. Raiser		
1971	Professor E. T. Salmon		
1971	Professor E. Staiger		
1971	Professor N. Tsuji		
1971	Professor B. H. Slicher van Bath		
1971	Professor W. C. Unnik		
1971	Professor G. R. Willey		
1972	Academician M. P. Alexeyev		
1972	Professor Hans Baron		
1972	Dr Ignacio Bernal		
1972	Professor Jean Bony		
1972	Professor Marius Canard		
1972	Professor Dr Helmut Coing		
1972	Professor Barker Fairley		
1972	Professor J. L. A. Filliozat		
1972	Professor Eugenio Garin		
1972	Professor Dr R. Ghirshman		
1972	Professor Einar Gjerstad		
1972	Dr Kurt Gödel		
1972	E. N. Griswold		
1972	Professor R. T. Hallock		
1972	Professor H. O'N. Hencken		
1972	Professor Louis Henry		
1972	Professor Jacques Heurgon		
1972	Professor Dr W. G. Kümmel		
1972	Mr Justice Laskin		
1972	Professor Spyridon Marinatos		
1972	Professor Georgi Mihailov		
1972	Professor K. N. Raj		
1972	Professor Eugène Vinaver		
1972	Professor C. V. Woodward		
1973	Professor Bertil Axelson		
1973	Professor Roland H. Bainton		
1973	Professor E. J. Bickerman		
1973	Professor Robert Brunschvig		
1973	Professor Y. R. Chao		
1973	Professor Kathleen Coburn		
1973	Professor Gaetano Cozzi		
1973	Professor François Crouzet		
1973	Professor Robert A. Dahl		
1973	Professor René David		
1973	Professor Dr W. Dehn		
1973	Professor Friedrich Engel-Janosi		
1973	Professor Dr Otto Demus		
1973	Professor John N. Hazard		
1973	Professor Dr J. Jeremias		
1973	Dr Vassos Karageorghis		
1973	Semni Karouzou		
1973	Professor Rudolf Kassel		
1973	Professor Dr R. Keydell		
1973	Professor P. O. Kristeller		
1973	Professor Maynard Mack		
1973	Professor R. S. MacNeish		
1973	Professor E. Malinvaud		
1973	Professor Millard Meiss		
1973	Professor J. Nougayrol		
1973	Professor D. M. Pippidi		
1973	Professor O. P. Okladnikov		
1973	Professor F. Solmsen		
1973	Professor Dr Anton Spitaler		
1973	Professor Hans von Balthasar		
1973	Professor Dr W. von Soden		
1973	Professor Kurt von Fritz		
1973	Professor René Wellek		
1973	Professor Piotr Zaionchkovski		
1974	Professor N. A. Chomsky		
1974	Professor D. G. Creighton		
1974	Dr J. M. de Navarro		
1974	Professor E. T. Donaldson		
1974	Professor Georges Dossin		
1974	Professor Fred Eggan		
1974	Professor Felix Gilbert		
1974	Professor Roman Jakobson		
1974	Rev. Father Thomas Käppeli		
1974	Professor Jerzy Kurylowicz		
1974	Sir Arthur Lewis		
1974	Dr Ibrahim Madkour		
1974	Sr Vitorino Magalhaes-Godinho		
1974	Professor K. G. Myrdal		
1974	Sr A. D. Ortiz		
1974	Professor W. K. Pritchett		
1974	Professor Karl Rahner		
1974	Professor P. B. Rigaux		
1974	Professor P. J. Riis		
1974	Professor A. C. Soper		
1974	Professor Jean Starobinski		
1974	Professor André Tunc		
1974	Professor Edouard Will		
1974	Professor J. L. E. J. Yver		
1974	Professor Xia Nai		
1975	Professor P. J. Alexander		
1975	Professor C. J. Becker		
1975	Professor M. W. Bloomfield		
1975	Professor Walter Burkert		
1975	Georges Daux		
1975	Professor Sirarpie Der Nersessian		
1975	Professor I. M. Diakonof		
1975	Professor Robert Folz		
1975	Professor H. N. Frye		
1975	Professor Martin Hengel		
1975	Professor Werner Kaegi		
1975	Professor J. F. Lemarignier		
1975	Rev. B. J. F. Lonergan		
1975	Dr Sarwat Okasha		
1975	Professor D. A. Olderogge		
1975	Professor J. A. Passmore		
1975	Professor R. M. Solow		
1975	Professor Oliver Strunk		
1975	Dr Sebastiano Timpanaro		
1975	Professor Kurt von Fischer		
1975	Professor Herbert Wechsler		
1975	Professor Ernst Weidner		
1976	Professor K. J. Arrow		
1976	Professor D. A. Binchy		
1976	Professor K. D. Bracher		
1976	Dr C. F. Bühler		
1976	Professor N. G. Butlin		
1976	Professor André Chastel		
1976	Professor Ruth J. Dean		
1976	Professor Ivan Dujčev		
1976	Professor Jan Filip		
1976	Very Rev. Dr George Florovsky		
1976	Professor Gino Gorla		
1976	Professor H. G. Güterbock		
1976	Professor Shirō Hattori		
1976	Professor Y. V. Keldish		
1976	Professor Walter Kienast		
1976	Professor Michael Lejeune		
1976	Professor Dmitri Likhachev		
1976	Professor R. S. Lopez		
1976	Professor W. H. McNeill		
1976	Professor Massimo Pallottino		
1976	Professor Karl Schefold		
1976	Professor Gershom Scholem		
1976	Professor Gerd Tellenbach		
1976	Professor D. A. Zakythinos		
1977	Dr P. Bastien		
1977	Professor H.-G. Beck		
1977	Professor M. de Bouard		
1977	Professor Dr K. G. Fellerer		
1977	Professor Dr W. Flume		
1977	Professor L. Grodecki		
1977	Professor B. Havránek		
1977	Professor C. G. Hempel		
1977	Professor V. V. Ivanov		
1977	Professor S. Iwao		
1977	Professor T. Jacobsen		
1977	Professor W. Jaffé		
1977	Professor Dr M. Kaser		
1977	Professor Dr H. Kellenbenz		
1977	Professor E. Labrousse		
1977	Professor D. Landes		
1977	Dr V. A. Livshits		
1977	Professor Y. M. Lotman		
1977	Rev. J. Meyendorff		
1977	Professor T. W. Moody		
1977	Professor E. Porada		
1977	Professor E. H. Riesenfeld		
1977	Professor C. Serizawa		
1977	Professor J. R. Strayer		
1977	Professor C. Violante		
1977	Dr P. Zancani Montuoro		
1978	Professor J. S. Ackerman		
1978	H. Ahrweiler		
1978	P. Amandry		
1978	Professor W. J. Bate		
1978	Professor M. Cappelletti		
1978	Professor C. G. Clark		
1978	Professor K. J. Conant		
1978	Père B. de Giaffier		
1978	Professor L. Dumont		
1978	Professor I. J. Gelb		
1978	Professor P. Goubert		
1978	Professor N. Grass		
1978	Professor D. J. Grout		
1978	Professor M. Guarducci		
1978	Professor J. Kornai		
1978	Professor N. M. W. Knox		
1978	Abbé R. P. J. Leroy		
1978	Professor B. M. Metzger		
1978	Professor E. S. Morgan		
1978	Dr N. N. Poppe		
1978	Professor H. W. Putnam		
1978	Professor F. R. Scott		
1979	Professor H. Erbse		
1979	Academician T. V. Gamkrelidze		
1979	Professor G. M. A. Hanfmann		
1979	Professor E. Lipiński		
1979	Professor L. L. Martz		
1980	Professor R. Aubert		
1980	Professor G. Calabresi		
1980	Professor A. P. Lerner		
1980	Professor D. F. McKenzie		
1980	Dr A. Tenenti		
1980	Dr F. Vian		
1980	Professor M. H. Wilson		
1980	Professor E. Winternitz		
1981	Professor I. B. Cohen		
1981	Professor D. H. Davidson		
1981	Professor P. Lemerle		
1981	Professor M. Rodinson		
1981	Professor T. Scitovsky		
1981	H. M. Seervai		
1981	Professor E. T. Vermeule		
1982	Professor L. Abramowski		
1982	Professor K. E. Boulding		
1982	Professor P. A. Freund		
1982	Professor A. Greifenhagen		
1982	Professor H. T. Levin		
1982	Professor M. Maruyama		
1982	Professor Dr K. Müller		
1982	Professor Dr R. C. Van Caenegem		
1982	Professor G. Vlastos		
1983	Professor J. Blau		
1983	Professor G. Constable		
1983	Professor Dr H. Fuhrmann		
1983	M.-M. Gauthier		
1983	Professor Dr H. Giersch		
1983	Professor G. F. Kennan		
1983	Professor D. J. Mulvaney		
1983	Professor J. Rawls		
1983	Professor L. Stone		
1983	Professor Dr E. von Caemmerer		
1984	Professor A. J. Coale		
1984	Professor Dr H. G. Gadamer		
1984	Professor A. Gieysztor		
1984	Professor M. Gigante		
1984	Professor A. O. Hirschman		
1984	Professor J. W. Kerman		
1984	Dr E. Laroche		
1984	Professor J.-P. Lauer		
1984	Professor E. Le Roy Ladurie		
1984	Professor O. O. G. M. MacDonagh		
1984	Dr R. Manselli		
1984	Professor R. Mortier		
1984	Professor J. Tobin		
1985	Professor W. Bühler		
1985	Professor Cheng Te-k'un		
1985	Professor R. H. Coase		
1985	Professor G. P. Cuttino		
1985	Professor I. Ehrenpreis		
1985	Professor R. Feenstra		
1985	Professor C. L. Frommel		
1985	Professor T. Hägerstrand		
1985	Professor Z. S. Harris		
1985	Professor S. A. Kripke		
1985	Professor S. Nowak		
1985	Professor H. D. Sankalia		
1985	Professor M. Simon		
1985	Professor H. von Petrikovits		
1986	Rev. M. Aubineau		
1986	Professor A. D. Chandler		
1986	Professor R. Cohen		
1986	Professor G. Contini		
1986	Professor G. A. Craig		
1986	Professor R. Ellrodt		
1986	Professor C. C. Gillispie		
1986	Professor H. Heimpel		
1986	Professor N. Himmelmann		
1986	Professor H. M. Hoenigswald		
1986	H. Honour		
1986	Professor G. Kossack		
1986	Professor R. Merkelbach		
1986	G. Posener		
1986	Professor K. Repgen		
1986	Dr N. Singh		
1986	Professor P. Wheatley		
1987	Professor R. H. Bautier		
1987	Professor C. I. E. Donaldson		
1987	Professor E. Gabba		
1987	Professor G. Haile		
1987	Dr P. R. Giot		
1987	Professor G. Himmelfarb		
1987	Professor H. Hunger		
1987	Professor D. Patinkin		
1987	Professor N. Pirrotta		
1987	Judge R. A. Posner		
1987	Professor S. L. Radt		
1987	Professor P. Schäfer		
1987	Professor H. van der Wee		
1987	Professor C. W. Watkins		
1988	Professor M. H. Abrams		
1988	Academician A. Aganbegyan		
1988	Professor T. Akiyama		
1988	Dr K. Baldinger		
1988	Dr L. E. Boyle		
1988	Professor W. Coblenz		
1988	Professor A. Dihle		
1988	Professor H. Fichtenau		
1988	Professor O. Grabar		
1988	Emeritus Professor W. Heissig		
1988	Professor Robert Heuston		
1988	Professor G. K. Hunter		
1988	Professor F. R. Kraus		
1988	Professor V. Lanternari		
1988	Professor C. Leonardi		
1988	Professor T. Nagel		
1988	Professor C. Nicolet		
1988	Dr H. A. Oberman		
1989	Professor B. Bailyn		
1989	J. Bean		
1989	Professor I. Berend		
1989	Professor C. Cipolla		
1989	Professor M. de Riquer		
1989	Professor M. Fumaroli		
1989	Professor M. A. K. Halliday		
1989	Professor S. A. Hopkins		
1989	Professor S. Kadish		
1989	Professor S. Mariotti		
1989	Professor S. Pollard		
1989	Professor I. Sevcenko		
1989	Professor G. Verbeke		
1989	Professor Brian Berry		
1990	Professor T. N. Bisson		
1990	Professor D. Bolinger		
1990	Professor J. Brunschwig		
1990	Abbot E. Dekkers		
1990	Professor J. H. Dreze		
1990	Professor R. E. Emmerick		
1990	Professor Dr O.-H. Frey		
1990	Professor D. J. Furley		
1990	Professor J. A. M. K. Ijsewijn		
1990	Professor F. Goguel		
1990	Professor A. Khazanov		
1990	Professor T. S. Kuhn		
1990	Professor C. Y. Lang		
1990	Professor J. G. A. Pocock		
1990	Professor M. Schapiro		
1990	Professor H. G. Schermers		
1990	Professor R. H. Super		
1990	Professor P. Zanker		
1991	Dr J. F. Bennett		
1991	Professor J. Elster		
1991	Professor Dr J. Fleckenstein		
1991	Professor R. Fogel		
1991	Dr J Fontaine		
1991	Professor M. Frenk		
1991	Professor C. Geertz		
1991	Professor H. Gneuss		
1991	Professor T. Gregory		
1991	Professor J. Hellner		
1991	Professor D. H. Hymes		
1991	Dr A. Ivanov		
1991	Professor L. W. Klein		
1991	Professor D. Kosary		
1991	Professor J. Leclant		
1991	Professor N. Lewis		
1991	Professor D. W. Meinig		
1991	Professor G. Melchiori		
1991	Professor Dr H. Otten		
1991	Professor W. Sauerlander		
1991	Dr W. Sundermann		
1991	Professor J. Y. Tadie		
1991	Professor D. E. Underdown		
1991	Professor J. Vachek		
1991	Professor O. Zwierlein		
1992	Professor J. W. Baldwin		
1992	Professor A. Béteille		
1992	Professor V. Branca		
1992	Professor D. B. Davis		
1992	Professor J. B. Duroselle		
1992	Professor E. Frykman		
1992	Professor J. S. Held		
1992	Professor E. Jeauneau		
1992	Professor L. Kalinowski		
1992	Professor C. P. Kindleberger		
1992	Professor P. Ladefoged		
1992	Professor D. K. Lewis		
1992	Professor A. A. Long		
1992	Professor W. A. Meeks		
1992	Professor H. Müller-Karpe		
1992	Professor J. D. North		
1992	Professor J. M. Price		
1992	Professor F. Rico		
1992	Professor F. Rosenthal		
1992	Professor Dr R. Smend		
1992	Professor M. N. Srinivas		
1992	Professor F. B. Vischer		
1993	Professor M. B. Emeneau		
1993	Professor O. Hufton		
1993	Professor Dr R. Kannicht		
1993	Dr I. D. Levin		
1993	Professor W. R. Louis		
1993	Dr Ma Chengyuan		
1993	Professor H. Mommsen		
1993	Professor S. A. Moralejo		
1993	Professor Dr W. U. Pannenberg		
1993	Dr K. F. Pantzer		
1993	Mr J. Richardson		
1993	Professor R. A. Stein		
1993	Professor J. E. Stiglitz		
1993	Professor B. Stroud		
1993	Professor Dr H. Wysling		
1994	Professor P. Barocchi		
1994	Rev. Professor R. E. Brown		
1994	Dr R. Conquest		
1994	Professor Dr B. Fabian		
1994	Professor Dr H. Franke		
1994	Professor G. P. Goold		
1994	Professor Dr J. Habermas		
1994	Professor A. MacIntyre		
1994	Professor A. Maddison		
1994	Professor M. P. Malmer		
1994	Professor R. K. Merton		
1994	Professor G. Pugliese		
1994	Professor F. C. Robinson		
1994	Professor O. H. K. Spate		
1994	Professor B. Tierney		
1994	Professor E. M. Uhlenbeck		
1994	Professor J. Vansina		
1994	Professor J.-P. Vernant		
1995	Professor R. J. Aumann		
1995	Dr A. Bounni		
1995	Professor N. Z. Davis		
1995	Professor E. A. Farnsworth		
1995	Professor E. Fischer-Jørgensen		
1995	Professor I. M. Hacking		
1995	Professor J. N. Hillgarth		
1995	Professor C. Hosoya		
1995	Professor H. Inalcik		
1995	Professor R. E. Lane		
1995	Professor H. J. Martin		
1995	Professor S. Slive		
1995	Professor H. H. von Staden		
1995	Professor D. Woodward		
1996	Professor M. Bietak		
1996	Professor R. Chartier		
1996	Dr H. G. Fischer		
1996	Professor J. G. Fleming		
1996	Professor E. Foner		
1996	Professor J. Gernet		
1996	Professor C. Habicht		
1996	Professor Dr B. Heine		
1996	Professor S. Hoffmann		
1996	Professor R. Horton		
1996	Professor R. Koselleck		
1996	Professor L. Ledderose		
1996	Professor J. Neubauer		
1996	Professor D. C. North		
1996	Professor R. Nozick		
1996	Professor H. Wolfram		
1997	Professor W. Berschin		
1997	Professor L. R. Binford		
1997	Professor R. Boudon		
1997	Professor W. M. Corden		
1997	Professor A. Grafton		
1997	Professor J. P. Greene		
1997	Dr M. H. Hansen		
1997	Professor J. A. W. Kamp		
1997	Dr H. Kötz		
1997	Professor E. Lichtenberger		
1997	Professor J. J. Linz		
1997	Professor L. Ricci		
1997	Professor T. M. Scanlon, Jr		
1997	Professor F. Šmahel		
1997	Professor J. D. Spence		
1998	Professor S. Alp		
1998	Professor D. M. Armstrong		
1998	Professor L. M. Cullen		
1998	Professor R. M. W. Dixon		
1998	Professor R. Erikson		
1998	Professor M. S. Feldstein		
1998	Professor N. D. C. Hammond		
1998	Professor D. W. Harvey		
1998	Professor R. H. Helmholz		
1998	Professor L. Koenen		
1998	Dr J. Le Goff		
1998	Professor P. Lejeune		
1998	Professor A. Lijphart		
1998	Dr J. K. McConica		
1998	Professor M. D. Sahlins		
1998	Professor L. Somfai		
1998	Professor B. W. Vickers		
1998	Professor Dr K. O. F. von Aretin		
1999	Professor P. Boitani	Italy	Comparative Literature
1999	Professor T. Burge	United States	Philosophy
1999	Professor Dr B. Comrie	Germany	Linguistics
1999	Professor J. de Vries	United States	History
1999	Professor G. Goldenberg	Israel	Semitic Languages
1999	Professor S. Heaney	Ireland	Literature
1999	Professor M. Keller	United States	History
1999	Professor R. D. Lee	United States	Demography and Economics
1999	Professor H. S. Powers	United States	Musicology
1999	Professor D. Roche	France	History
1999	Dr F. W. Scharpf	Germany	Political Studies
1999	Professor A. J. Scott	United States	Economic Geography
1999	Professor P. L. Shinnie	Canada	Archaeology
1999	Professor R. Thapar	India	History
1999	Dr P. Vidal-Naquet	France	Classics
1999	Professor C. A. Wright	United States	Law
2000	Professor L. Balsamo	Italy	Bibliography
2000	Professor S. H. Beer	United States	Political Science
2000	Professor O. S. D’A. Hart	United States	Economics
2000	Professor G. Hartman	United States	English Literature
2000	Professor C. F. W. Higham	New Zealand	Archaeology
2000	Professor Dr E. Hornung	Switzerland	Egyptology
2000	Professor F. Jackson	Australia	Philosophy
2000	Professor Dr K. U. Mayer	Germany	Sociology
2000	Professor J. Pelikan	United States	Theology
2000	Professor Dr W. Reinhard	Germany	History
2000	Professor L. Rizzi	Italy	Linguistics
2000	Professor G. Tabacco	Italy	History
2000	Professor S. J. Tambiah	United States	Anthropology
2000	Professor Dr C. von Bar	Germany	Law
2001	Professor J. Appleby	United States	History
2001	Professor P. Bourdieu	France	Sociology
2001	Professor P. M. Cátedra-García	Spain	Spanish Literature
2001	Professor T. J. Clark	United States	History of Art
2001	Professor R. Darnton	United States	History
2001	Professor A. D. Deaton	United States	Economics
2001	Professor W. Iser	United States and Germany	English
2001	Professor N. Jareborg	Sweden	Law
2001	Professor M. Mayrhofer	Austria	Linguistics
2001	Professor R. T. Michael	United States	Demography
2001	Professor W. W. Müller	Germany	Oriental Studies
2001	Professor J. Perner	Austria	Psychology
2001	Professor R. D. Putnam	USA	Political Science
2001	Professor E. Simon	Germany	Classical Antiquity
2001	Rev. Professor R. F. Taft	Italy	Theology
2001	Professor Yi-Fu Tuan	USA	Geography
2002	Professor M. Coltheart	Australia	Psychology
2002	Professor N.G. Garsoïan	United States	Near Eastern Studies
2002	Professor C. Ginzburg	United States	History
2002	Professor C. W. J. Granger	United States	Economics
2002	Professor H. Keller	Germany	History
2002	Professor J. Kristeva	France	French literature
2002	Professor J. M. Maravall	Spain	Sociology
2002	Professor J. M. Powell	Australia	Geography
2002	Professor C. Rosen	United States	Musicology
2002	Professor R. Zimmermann	Germany	Law
2003	Professor H. W. Arthurs	Canada	Law
2003	Professor F. Barth	Norway	Anthropology
2003	Professor W. P. Blockmans	The Netherlands	History
2003	Professor J. S. Bruner	United States	Psychology
2003	Professor F. Coarelli	Italy	Classics
2003	Academician M. L. Gasparov	Russia	Literature
2003	Professor P. M. Kennedy	USA	History
2003	Professor H. Love	Australia	Literature
2003	Professor E. S. Maskin	United States	Economics
2003	Professor A. Ranney	United States	Political Studies
2004	Professor G. Alpa	Italy	Law
2004	Professor G. A. Brucker	United States	History
2004	Professor W. Eck	Germany	Classics
2004	Professor R. E. Goodin	Australia	Political Studies
2004	Professor A. Hamilton	The Netherlands	Oriental Studies
2004	Professor H. Pinkster	The Netherlands	Linguistics
2004	Professor T. Sasaki	Japan	Political Studies
2004	Professor H. Schilling	Germany	History
2004	Professor S. Shoemaker	United States	Philosophy
2004	Professor W. J. Wilson	United States	Sociology
2005	Professor Ofer Bar-Yosef	United States	Archaeology
2005	Professor William Baumol	United States	Economics
2005	Professor David Bevington	United States	English Literature
2005	Professor Nicholas Canny	Ireland	History
2005	Professor Kit Fine	United States	Philosophy
2005	Professor Yash Ghai	Hong Kong	Law
2005	Professor Rodney Huddleston	Australia	Linguistics
2005	Professor Detlef Liebs	Germany	Law
2005	Professor Allan Pred	United States	Geography
2005	Professor John Roemer	United States	Political Studies
2006	Professor Roger Bagnall	United States	Classics
2006	Professor Guy Canivet	France	Law
2006	Professor Manuel Castells	United States	Sociology
2006	Professor Martina Deuchler	Switzerland	Korean Studies
2006	Professor Avinash Dixit	United States	Economics
2006	Professor Shmuel Eisenstadt	Israel	Sociology
2006	Professor Michael Fried	United States	History of Art
2006	Professor Aleksandr Kibrik	Russia	Theoretical and Applied Linguistics
2006	Professor Emanuel Tov	Israel	Biblical Studies
2006	Professor Phillippe Van Parijs	Belgium	Economic and Social Ethics
2007	Philip Bohlman		Mary Werkman Distinguished Service Professor of the Humanities and of Music, University of Chicago
2007	Peter Cane		Professor and Director, John Fleming Centre for Advancement of Legal Research, The Australian National University College of Law
2007	Susan Carey		Henry A. Morss, Jr, and Elizabeth W. Morss Professor of Psychology, Harvard University
2007	Noël Duval		Emeritus Professor, Ancient History and Archaeology, University of Paris, Sorbonne – Paris IV
2007	Derek Gregory		Distinguished university scholar and professor of geography, University of British Columbia at Vancouver
2007	Tony Judt		University Professor and Director, The Remarque Institute, New York University
2007	David Kaplan		Hans Reichenbach Distinguished Professor of Scientific Philosophy, University of California, Los Angeles
2007	Denis Knoepfler		Professor of Classical Archaeology and Ancient History, University of Neuchâtel; Professor of the History and Epigraphy of the Greek Cities, Collège de France
2007	Joseph Nye		University Distinguished Service Professor and the Sultan of Oman Professor of International Relations, Harvard University
2007	Ariel Rubinstein		Professor of Economics, Tel Aviv University; Professor of Economics, New York University
2008	Professor Agostino Paravicini Baglianie		Professor of Medieval History, University of Lausann
2008	Professor Thomas Elsaesser		Research Professor, Media and Culture, University of Amsterdam
2008	Professor Daniel Kahneman		Eugene Higgins Professor of Psychology and Emeritus Professor of Public Affairs, Princeton University
2008	Professor Martha Nussbaum		Ernst Freund Distinguished Service Professor of Law and Ethics, University of Chicago
2008	Professor Peter C. B. Phillips		Sterling Professor of Economics and Professor of Statistics, Yale University; Distinguished Alumnus Professor, University of Auckland; Distinguished Term Professor, Singapore Management University; Adjunct Professor, University of York
2008	Professor Anthony Reid		Director, Asia Research Institute, National University of Singapore
2008	Professor Pat Rogers		DeBartolo Professor in the Liberal Arts, University of South Florida
2008	Professor Dame Anne Salmond		Distinguished Professor of Maori Studies and Anthropology, University of Auckland
2008	Professor Dan Sperber		Directeur de Recherche au Centre National de la Recherche Scientifique, Institut Jean Nicod, Paris
2008	Professor Bas C. van Fraassen		Distinguished University Professor, San Francisco State University
2009	Professor Pierre Briant		Professeur au Collège de France, Paris
2009	Professor Harold C. Brookfield		Emeritus Professor and Visiting Fellow, Department of Anthropology, The Australian National University
2009	Professor John Y. Campbell		Morton L. and Carole S. Olshan Professor of Economics, Harvard University
2009	Professor Antoine Compagnon		Professeur au Collège de France, Paris; Blanche W. Knopf Professor of French and Comparative Literature, Columbia University, New York
2009	Professor Philip Gossett		Robert W. Reneker Distinguished Service Professor, University of Chicago
2009	Professor Theodore R. Marmor		Professor of Public Policy and Management, Emeritus, Yale University School of Management
2009	Professor Donald B. Rubin		John L. Loeb Professor of Statistics, Harvard University
2009	Professor Elizabeth Traugott		Professor of Linguistics and English, Emeritus, Stanford University, California; Visiting Professor, University of Stockholm
2009	Professor Anne Treisman		James S. McDonnell Distinguished University Professor of Psychology, Princeton University
2009	Professor Josef van Ess		Emeritus Professor of Islamic Studies and Semitic Languages, University of Tübingen, Germany
2010	Professor Kofi Agawu		Professor of Music, Princeton University; Adjunct Professor, The University of Ghana, Legon
2010	Professor Peter Brooks		Sterling Professor Emeritus of Comparative Literature, Yale University; Andrew W. Mellon Foundation Scholar in the University Center for Human Values and the Department of Comparative Literature, Princeton University
2010	Professor Janet Browne		Aramont Professor of the History of Science, Harvard University
2010	Professor Francis X. Clooney		Parkman Professor of Divinity and Comparative Theology, Harvard Divinity School
2010	Professor Lorraine Daston		Director, Max Planck Institute for the History of Science; Visiting Professor in the Committee on Social Thought, University of Chicago.
2010	Professor Stanislas Dehaene		Professor, Collège de France; Directeur, INSERM-CEA Cognitive Neuroimaging Unit
2010	Professor Philippe Descola		Professor, Collège de France; Director of Studies, École des Hautes Études en Sciences Sociales, Paris
2010	Professor Gøsta Esping-Andersen		Icrea Academia Professor of Sociology, Universita Pompeu Fabra
2010	Professor Michael F. Goodchild		Professor of Geography, University of California, Santa Barbara
2010	Professor James Gordley		W. R. Irby Professor of Law, Tulane University Law School
2010	Professor Paul Kiparsky		Robert M. and Anne T. Bass Professor in the School of Humanities and Sciences, Stanford University
2010	Professor Guy Laroque		Head of Laboratoire de Macroéconomie, INSEE-CREST; Professor of Economics, University College London
2010	Professor Dr Dr H.C. Mult. Hermann Parzinger		President, Prussian Cultural Heritage Foundation
2010	Professor Robert O. Keohane		Professor of International Affairs, Princeton University
2010	Justin Yifu Lin		Chief Economist and Senior Vice-President, World Bank
2011	Professor David Blackbourn		Coolidge Professor of History, Harvard University
2011	Professor Michael Cook		Class of 1943 University Professor of Near Eastern Studies, Princeton University
2011	Professor William Courtenay		Hilldale Professor and Charles Homer Haskins Professor Emeritus, University of Wisconsin–Madison
2011	Professor Denis Crouzet		Professor of Modern History, Université Paris Sorbonne
2011	Professor Nicholas Evans		Head of Linguistics, School of Culture, History and Language, College of Asia–Pacific, Australian National University
2011	Professor Susan Fiske		Eugene Higgins Professor of Psychology, Princeton University
2011	Professor Patrick Geary		Distinguished Professor of History, University of California, Los Angeles
2011	Professor Jane Ginsburg		Morton L. Janklow Professor of Literary and Artistic Property Law, Columbia University
2011	Professor William Harris		Professor of History and Director of the Center for the Ancient Mediterranean, Columbia University
2011	Professor Kirsten Hastrup		Professor of Anthropology, University of Copenhagen
2011	Professor Will Kymlicka		Canada Research Chair in Political Philosophy, Queen's University, Canada
2011	Professor Patrick Le Galès		CNRS Research Professor, Centre d'Etudes Européennes, Sciences Po Paris
2011	Professor Chiara Saraceno		Forschungsprofessorin, Wissenschaftszentrum Berlin für Sozialforschung
2011	Professor Thomas Sargent		Senior Fellow, Hoover Institution, Stanford University; Professor of Economics, New York University
2011	Professor Michael Wood		Charles Barnwell Straut Class of 1923 Professor of English and Comparative Literature, Princeton University
2012	Professor Michael Allen		Distinguished Professor Emeritus, UCLA
2012	Professor Mary Carruthers		Erich Maria Remarque Professor of Literature, NYU
2012	Professor Alain de Libera		Full Professor of History of Medieval Philosophy, University of Geneva
2012	Professor Elhanan Helpman		Galen L. Stone Professor of International Trade, Harvard University
2012	Professor Michel Jeanneret		Professeur Honoraire, University of Geneva
2012	Professor John Langbein		Sterling Professor of Law and Legal History, Yale University
2012	Professor Jean-Pierre Mahé		Directeur d’études à L’École Practique des Hautes Études
2012	Professor W. J. T. Mitchell		Gaylord Donnelly Distinguished Service Professor of English and Art History, University of Chicago
2012	Professor Ian Morris		Jean and Rebecca Willard Professor of Classics, Stanford University
2012	Professor Torsten Persson		Torsten and Ragnar Soderberg Chair in Economic Sciences, Stockholm University
2012	Professor Denise Pumain		Professor in Geography, University of Paris 1 Pantheon-Sorbonne
2012	Professor John Scheid		Professor of Religion, Institutions and Society in Ancient Rome, Collège de France
2012	Professor Michael Storper		Professor of Regional and International Development, UCLA
2012	Professor Gerald Toomer		Professor Emeritus of the History of Mathematics, Brown University
2012	Professor Bernard Wasserstein		Harriet and Ulrich E. Meyer Professor of Modern European Jewish History, University of Chicago
2013	Professor Susan Alcock		Director Joukowsky Institute for Archaeology and the Ancient World, Joukowsky Family Professor in Archaeology and Professor of Classics, Brown University
2013	Professor Patrick Bolton		Barbara and David Zalaznick Professor of Business Finance and Economics, Columbia University
2013	Professor Patricia Crone		Mellon Professor of Islamic Studies, Institute for Advanced Study, Princeton
2013	Professor Aurora Egido		Professor of Spanish Literature, University of Zaragoza
2013	Professor Ute Frevert		Director, Max Planck Institute for Human Development, Berlin
2013	Professor David Garland		Arthur T. Vanderbilt Professor of Law and Professor of Sociology, New York University
2013	Dr Leonardo López Luján	Mexico	Senior researcher and Director of the Proyecto Templo Mayor, Museo del Templo Major, Instituto Nacional de Antropologia e Historia
2013	Professor Philip Pettit		L. S. Rockefeller University Professor of Politics and Human Values, Princeton University; Distinguished Professor of Philosophy, Australian National University
2013	Professor Beatriz Sarlo		Retired Professor of Argentine Literature, University of Buenos Aires and Consejo Nacional de S Investigaciones Científicas y Técnicas.
2013	Professor Robert Stalnaker		Laurance S. Rockefeller Professor of Philosophy, Massachusetts Institute of Technology
2013	Professor Shelley Taylor		Distinguished Professor of Psychology, University of California, Los Angeles
2013	Professor Gunther Teubner		Professor of Private Law and Legal Sociology (Emeritus), Principal Investigator at the Excellence Cluster Goethe-University Frankfurt
2013	Professor Richard Wrangham		Ruth Moore Professor of Biological Anthropology, Harvard University
2013	Professor Dr Wolfgang Prinz		Director Emeritus, Max Planck Institute for Human Cognitive and Brain Sciences, Leipzig
2013	Professor Robert Young		Julius Silver Professor of English and Comparative Literature, New York University
2014	Professor Svetlana Alpers		
2014	Professor Trevor Barnes		
2014	Professor Gian Biagio Conte		
2014	Professor Janet Dean Fodor		
2014	Professor Naomi Ellemers		
2014	Professor James Hankins		
2014	Professor Lynn Hunt		
2014	Professor Martti Koskenniemi		
2014	Professor Henri Leridon		
2014	Professor Jane Mansbridge		
2014	Professor Charles Manski		
2014	Professor Dr Claudia Märtl		
2014	Professor Dr Jürgen Osterhammel		
2014	Professor Michael Posner		
2014	Professor Yutaka Yoshida		
2015	Professor Philippe Aghion		Robert C. Waggoner Professor of Economics, Harvard University; Professeur au College de France sur la Chaire d Economie des Institutions, de l'Innovation, et de la Croissance; Centennial Professor of Economics, London School of Economics
2015	Professor Mahzarin Banaji		Richard Clarke Cabot Professor of Social Ethics, Harvard University
2015	Professor Lina Bolzoni		Professor of Italian Literature, Scuola Normale Superiore, Pisa
2015	Professor Joan Bresnan		Sadie Dernham Patek Professor in Humanities, Emerita, Professor of Linguistics, Emerita, and Senior Researcher, CSLI, Stanford University
2015	Professor Judith Butler		Maxine Elliot Professor of Comparative Literature and Critical Theory, University of California, Berkeley
2015	Professor Martha Crenshaw		Senior Fellow, Center for International Security and Cooperation (CISAC), Freeman Spogli Institute for International Studies; Professor of Political Science, Stanford University
2015	Professor Natalio Fernández Marcos		Professor Vinculado ad Honorem, CSIC (Consejo Superior de Investigaciones Científicas), Centro de Ciencias Humanas y Sociales
2015	Professor Meric Gertler		President, University of Toronto
2015	Dr Miltiades Hatzopoulos		Formerly Director of the Institute of Greek and Roman Antiquity (KERA), Athens
2015	Professor Peter Katzenstein		Walter S. Carpenter Jr Professor of International Relations, Cornell University
2015	Professor Christine Korsgaard		Arthur Kingsley Porter Professor of Philosophy, Harvard University
2015	Professor Michael Mann		Distinguished Professor of Sociology, University of California, Los Angeles; Honorary Professor, University of Cambridge
2015	Professor Judith Olszowy-Schlanger		Professor of Hebrew and Judaeo-Arabic Manuscript Studies, Ecole Pratique des Hautes Etudes
2015	Professor Alexander Potts		Max Loehr Collegiate Professor of History of Art, University of Michigan
2015	Professor Simon Schama		University Professor of History and Art History, Columbia University
2015	Professor Elizabeth Spelke		Marshall L. Berkman Professor of Psychology, Harvard University
2015	Professor Jane Stapleton		Research Professor of Law, College of Law, Australian National University; Ernest E Smith Professor of Law, University of Texas
2015	Professor Alain Supiot		Professor, Chaire État social et mondialisation, Collège de France, Paris
2015	Professor André Vauchez		Emeritus Professor of History of the Middle Ages, University of Paris-Ouest-Nanterre; Former Director of the Ecole Française de Rome
2015	Professor Jane Waldfogel		Compton Foundation Centennial Professor of Social Work, Columbia University School of Social Work; Visiting Professor, Centre for Analysis of Social Exclusion (CASE), London School of Economics
2016	Professor Pauline Allen		
2016	Professor Susan Athey		
2016	Professor Peter Bellwood		
2016	Professor Gráinne De Búrca		
2016	Professor Esther Duflo		
2016	Professor Kathleen Eisenhardt		
2016	Professor Laura Engelstein		
2016	Professor Denis Feeney		
2016	Professor Jane M. Jacobs		
2016	Professor George E. Lewis		
2016	Professor Toril Moi		
2016	Professor Joel Mokyr		
2016	Professor Elizabeth J. Perry		
2016	Professor Derek R. Peterson		
2016	Professor Robert J. Sampson		
2016	Professor Núria Sebastián Gallés		
2016	Professor Dr Wolfgang Streeck		
2016	Professor Sanjay Subrahmanyam		
2016	Professor Judith Thomson		
2016	Professor Michael Walzer		
2017	Professor John Agnew		Distinguished Professor of Geography and Italian, University of California, Los Angeles
2017	Professor Susanne Baer		Justice, Federal Constitutional Court of Germany; Professor of Law and Gender Studies, Humboldt University; William W. Cook Global Law Professor, University of Michigan
2017	Professor Dr Dr h.c. Eszter Bánffy		Director, Romano-Germanic Commission, German Archaeological Institute
2017	Professor Caroline Walker Bynum		Professor Emerita of Medieval European History, Institute for Advanced Study, Princeton; University Professor Emerita, Columbia University
2017	Professor William Cronon		Frederick Jackson Turner and Vilas Research Professor of History, Geography and Environmental Studies, University of Wisconsin-Madison
2017	Professor Marie-Luce Demonet		Emeritus Professor of French Literature (Renaissance), Senior Fellow, Institut Universitaire de France, Centre d'Etudes Supérieures de la Renaissance, University François-Rabelais, Tours
2017	Professor Georges Didi-Huberman		Directeur d'Études à l'École des Hautes Études en Sciences Sociales (Paris)
2017	Professor Peter Hall		Krupp Foundation Professor of European Studies, Harvard University
2017	Professor Rebecca Henderson		John and Natty McArthur University Professor, Harvard University; Co-Director, Business & Environment Initiative, Harvard Business School
2017	Professor Nancy Kanwisher		Walter A. Rosenblith Professor of Cognitive Neuroscience, and Investigator, McGovern Institute for Brain Research, Massachusetts Institute of Technology
2017	Professor Mahmood Mamdani		Herbert Lehman Professor of Government and Professor of Anthropology, Columbia University; Professor and Executive Director, Makerere Institute of Social Research, Makerere University
2017	Professor Jay McClelland		Lucie Stern Professor in the Social Sciences, and Director, Center for Mind, Brain, and Computation, Stanford University
2017	Professor Kenneth Pomeranz		University Professor in History and the College, Professor of East Asian Languages and Civilizations, The University of Chicago
2017	Professor James Poterba		Mitsui Professor of Economics, Massachusetts Institute of Technology; President, National Bureau of Economic Research
2017	Professor Dr Claudia Rapp		Professor of Byzantine Studies, University of Vienna
2017	Professor Ineke Sluiter		Academy Professor, Royal Netherlands Academy of Arts and Sciences (KNAW); Professor of Greek, Leiden University
2017	Professor Dr Barbara Stollberg-Rilinger		Professor of Early Modern History, Historical Institute, University of Münster
2017	Professor Cass Sunstein		Robert Walmsley University Professor, Harvard Law School
2017	Professor Agnès van Zanten		Senior CNRS Research Professor, Centre National de la Recherche Scientifique (CNRS)
2017	Professor Manfred Woidich		Emeritus Professor of Arabic Language and Linguistics, University of Amsterdam
2020	Professor Kathryn Sikkink	USA	Ryan Family Professor of Human Rights Policy at the Harvard Kennedy School
2022	Professor Mamadou Diawara	Germany	Ethnologist, Goethe University Frankfurt and Deputy Director of Frobenius Institute, Director of ‘Point Sud’, Research Centre for Local Knowledge in Bamako, Mali
