= Dictionnaire étymologique de l'ancien français =

The Dictionnaire étymologique de l'ancien français (DEAF) is an etymological dictionary of Old French. The lexicographic project was born in the mid-1960s and has been in progress ever since with its headquarters at the Heidelberg Academy of Sciences and Humanities (Germany). Known and valued amongst linguists, philologists and medievalists alike for its high lexicographic standards it is considered one of the most important works in the field of historical lexicography.

== History ==
It was in the mid-1960s when Kurt Baldinger (Heidelberg) and Jean-Denis Gendron (Québec) set out individually to conceive an etymological dictionary of Old French, both without knowing about their colleague's endeavor. On the occasion of the International Congress of Romance Studies in Bucarest in 1968, Georges Straka initiated a common projet based at Laval University under the direction of Frankwalt Möhren. When in 1975 the Conseil des arts du Canada withdrew financial support the DEAF moved back to Heidelberg, F. Möhren having saved the so far established card file while all other materials where lost for future work. In 1977 the Deutsche Forschungsgemeinschaft (DFG) took charge and with F. Möhren as research director a period of reconstruction and methodological refinement began. In 1984 the Heidelberg Academy of Sciences and Humanities became patron of the DEAF backing the ongoing enhancement of the editing system which reached full maturity in the mid-nineties. Years of prolific editing followed until in 2005 a major setback occurred when the originally granted time frame (2050) for achieving the work was cut by 25 years. Consequently, adapted working strategies including computer-assisted solutions were developed in order to keep alive the possibility of including the entire alphabet. From 2007 on, with Thomas Städtler as head of the project, two correlating goals were pursued: exploiting those parts of the Old French lexicon which had been rather neglected in historical lexicography so far and creating a powerful database meeting the DEAF's specific demands. The envisaged database was to serve the scientific world as a coordinate system, linking together the whole of the DEAF nomenclature, all existing and yet to be established text corpora as well as scientific works on Old French topics. When the finishing deadline was preponed again, computer-assisted editing was globally adopted by working together with the Karlsruher Institut für Datenorganisation und Programmstrukturen between 2008 and 2010. DEAF articles are accessible online since 2010.

== Properties ==
The DEAF can be categorised as a descriptive dictionary of Old French focussing more on linguistic than on traditional philological aspects. However it systematically includes encyclopedic information in semantic analysis and above all by providing a great number of citations serving to illustrate and corroborate senses given in (usually scholastic) definitions. In etymological and semantic argument the authors take special care to explicate statements and to cite existing viewpoints. In-depth lexicological analysis and systematic exploitation of tertiary sources attest to the methodological legacy of the Französisches etymologisches Wörterbuch (FEW) by Walter von Wartburg carried on in the DEAF, the more so as DEAF-founder Kurt Baldinger was one of von Wartburg's scholars and a longtime FEW staff member.

The lexicographical concept of the DEAF aims at exhaustive processing of all kinds of available sources such as medieval literary and non-literary texts (primary sources), dictionaries (tertiary sources) as well as contemporary special language glossaries, treatises etc. (secondary sources). As a rule all primary sources used in the DEAF for text evidence are dated and located. The resulting collection of filing cards ('slips') counts 1.5 million units referring to 12 million sources, each stating, as a minimum, a headword (lemma) and the respective word meaning. Based on this collection the DEAF nomenclature (macrostructure) counts roughly 85′000 entries grouped by word families in order to emphasise their etymological relationship. The lemmatised form of the headword is provided by the immediate Old French descendant of the etymon. Old French being particularly well attested the DEAF taps into a large pool of text evidence to gather, analyse and corroborate lexicographic data.

DEAF microstructure (internal structure of dictionary articles) starts with an etymological discussion consisting of fluent sentences which allows for an easy approach to the otherwise elliptically condensed ’word biography’ a typical DEAF article showcases. Besides critical investigation and identifying of the etymon which includes neighbour languages, this section gives a brief description of the individual word history and discusses controversial viewpoints. The third section renders graphical variants with correspondent references and is followed by the semantic description making up the core of each article: the phrastic or Aristotelian (genus-differentia) definition first gives a generic term the meaning of which is then narrowed by adding distinctive properties until the full meaning of the word in question is clarified. The definition is flanked by at least one piece of text evidence illustrating the given meaning, a notable specificity of the DEAF being that it provides reference dating throughout the articles and makes these indications available by the bias of standardised acronymes leading to the correspondent entry in the DEAF bibliography (DEAFBibl, DEAFBiblél).

== Importance ==
Due to its highly scientific and rather linguistic approach to the Old French lexicon and its reliable internal structure but also for its lexical coverage the DEAF is one of the most important works of historical lexicography. By considering not only text corpora but also tertiary sources such as the Altfranzösisches Wörterbuch by Adolf Tobler and Erhard Lommatzsch, the Godefroy or the FEW and by including the entire alphabet the DEAF constitutes a networking enterprise unequalled in the field so far. Moreover, the historico-cultural load rendered through consequent contextualising of word meanings has earned the DEAF a reference reputation beyond romance and medieval studies.

== Publishing history ==
All letters of the alphabet are represented in DEAF articles. However, only those concerning the letters F–K (and partially D and E) were published in printed form. The G–K portion belongs to the first publishing period and was released in multi-volume book format:

- Dictionnaire étymologique de l'ancien français, Bände G–K, ed. by Kurt Baldinger et al., since 2005 by Frankwalt Möhren et al., Tübingen 1971–2008.

These volumes were digitalised and are available in PDF format, providing search functions for headwords and graphical variants.

As to the letters E and F, numerous articles were published from 2012 to 2020 as printed fascicles (F1–F4/5, E1–E2/3) (for details cf. DEAF bibliography entering DEAF in Sigel search field) and released online (DEAFplus) with a two-year moving wall. These contents (as partition of DEAFél) comprise extended search options and extra material. DEAFpré is another child branch of DEAFél containing articles under progress the correctness of which no responsibility is taken for, nevertheless they are open to consultation.

=== Related works ===
- Complément bibliographique 1974, rédigé par Frankwalt Möhren, Québec/Tübingen/Paris 1974.
- Complément bibliographique 1993, rédigé par Frankwalt Möhren, Québec/Tübingen/Paris 1993.
- Complément bibliographique 2007, rédigé par Frankwalt Möhren, Québec/Tübingen/Paris 2007.
- Index G par Martina Fietz-Beck, Tübingen/Québec 1997.
- Index H par Sabine Tittel, Tübingen/Québec 2000.
- Index I/J/K par Sabine Tittel, Tübingen 2008.

On the DEAF-Website finden sich die Schriftenverzeichnisse der DEAF-Mitarbeiter.

== The DEAF Bibliography ==
Dictionary articles are typically compact and elliptic, but DEAF articles (except for the etymological introduction) appear to be particularly so due to its system of sigla which can be daunting at first. This system, however, allows for more space for citations on the one hand and for exhaustive rendering of references on the other. It is important to know that the greatest benefit can be drawn from the DEAF by using the DEAF bibliography. This powerful supplement created and constantly elaborated by Frankwalt Möhren forms indeed an integral part of the DEAF project as a whole and is not only published as a book but also freely accessible online (DEAFBiblél). All texts, manuscripts and editions are registered and localised within the history of literature (including non-fiction). Each entry offers a short description as well as comments on sources and editorial history. The high consistency of the reference structure between DEAF and DEAF-bibliography are a crucial point in the DEAF's reputation as a linguistically elaborated and yet practically useful dictionary. Moreover, as DEAF sigla correspond to a great extent with those used in existing reference works such as Tobler-Lommatzsch, Godefroy or FEW and correspondents are indicated for mismatches, the DEAF serves also as a useful tool for working with these classical historical dictionaries.

== See also ==
- Old French
- Anglo-Norman
- Französisches etymologisches Wörterbuch

== Bibliography ==
- Buchi, Éva/Renders, Pascale (2013): “Galloromance I: Historical an etymological lexicography”, In: Hausmann, F.J. et al. (eds.), Dictionaries. An International Encyclopedia of Lexicography, 4: Supplementary volume: Recent developments with focus on electronic and computational lexicography, Berlin: De Gruyter, p. 653-662.
- Gossen, Carl T. (1978): “K. Baldinger, avec la collaboration de J.-D. Gendron et G. Straka: ‚Dictionnaire étymologique de l'ancien français (DEAF)‘ (Book Review)”, In: Vox Romanica 37 (1978), S. 278 – 283.
- Möhren, Frankwalt (1974): “Le DEAF (*) (Dictionnaire étymologique de l'ancien français)“, In: Baldinger, K. (ed.): Bulletin des Jeunes Romanistes, Strasbourg: Klinksieck, p. 163-184.
- Städtler, Thomas: „Dictionnaire étymologique de l'ancien français (DEAF). Altfranzösisches etymologisches Wörterbuch“, in: Sellin, Volker/Wolgast, Eike/Zwies, Sebastian: Die Forschungsvorhaben der Heidelberger Akademie der Wissenschaften 1909-2009, Winter, Heidelberg 2009, S. 179–184.
- Trotter, David A. (2001): „Dictionnaire étymologique de l'ancien français (DEAF). By Kurt Baldinger. Publié sous la direction philologique de Frankwalt Möhren. Niemeyer, Tübingen/ Presses universitaires de Québec, Laval. H2: hardi-herbergier (1998). H3: hebergier-honte (1999). H4-5 honte-hyne^{2} (2000). xii PP. + 820 cols.[review]“, In: French Studies, Volume LV, Issue 4, October 2001, Pages 582–583, https://doi.org/10.1093/fs/LV.4.582.
- Wiegand, Herbert E. (2017): Dictionary of lexicography and dictionary research, Volume 2: D-H, Berlin/Boston:De Gruyter.
