= Zumthor =

Zumthor is a Swiss German surname, which means "to the gate". Notable people with the surname include:

- Paul Zumthor (1915–1995), Swiss medievalist, literary historian, and linguist
- Peter Zumthor (born 1943), Swiss architect
