= Paul Maas =

Paul Maas is the name of:

- Paul Maas (classical scholar) (1880–1964), German classical scholar
- Paul Maas (botanist) (born 1939), Dutch botanist
