= Wolfgang Schweickard =

Wolfgang Schweickard (born 16 October 1954 in Aschaffenburg) is a German Romance studies scholar and lexicographer.

His main research areas are history of Romance languages and lexicography. He is co-editor of the Zeitschrift für romanische Philologie and the yearbook Lexicographica. Current projects are the Deonomasticon Italicum (DI), the Lessico etimologico italiano (LEI) (together with Max Pfister) and the Dictionnaire étymologique des langues romanes (DÉRom) (together with Éva Buchi).
