= Von Wartburg =

von Wartburg is a surname. Notable people with the surname include:

- Arthur von Wartburg (born 1952), Swiss footballer
- Walther von Wartburg (1888–1971), Swiss philologist and lexicographer
- Urs von Wartburg (born 1937), Swiss javelin thrower
