= Leridon =

Leridon (or Léridon) may refer to:

== Surname ==
- Henri Leridon (born 1942), French demographer
- Matthias Leridon (born 1962), French businessman
- Michèle Léridon (1958-2021), French journalist

== Place ==
- Leridon River, Canadian river in north of Québec
