= Harassment =

Wide range of behaviours of an offensive nature

Harassment covers a wide range of behaviors of an offensive nature. It is commonly understood as behavior that demeans, humiliates, and intimidates a person. In the legal sense, these are behaviors that are disturbing, upsetting, or threatening to a person. Some harassment evolves from discriminatory grounds, and has the effect of nullifying a person's rights or impairing a person from utilising their rights.

When bullying behaviors become repetitive, it is defined as harassment. The continuity or repetitiveness and the aspect of distressing, alarming or threatening may distinguish it from insult. It also constitutes a tactic of coercive control, which may be deployed by an abuser. Harassment is a specific form of discrimination, and occurs when a person is the victim of unwanted intimidating, offensive, or humiliating behavior.

In some jurisdictions, to qualify as harassment, there must be a connection between the harassing behavior and a person's protected personal characteristics or prohibited grounds of discrimination, but this is not always the case. Although harassment typically involves behavior that persists, serious and malicious one-off incidents are also considered harassment in extreme cases.

== Etymology ==
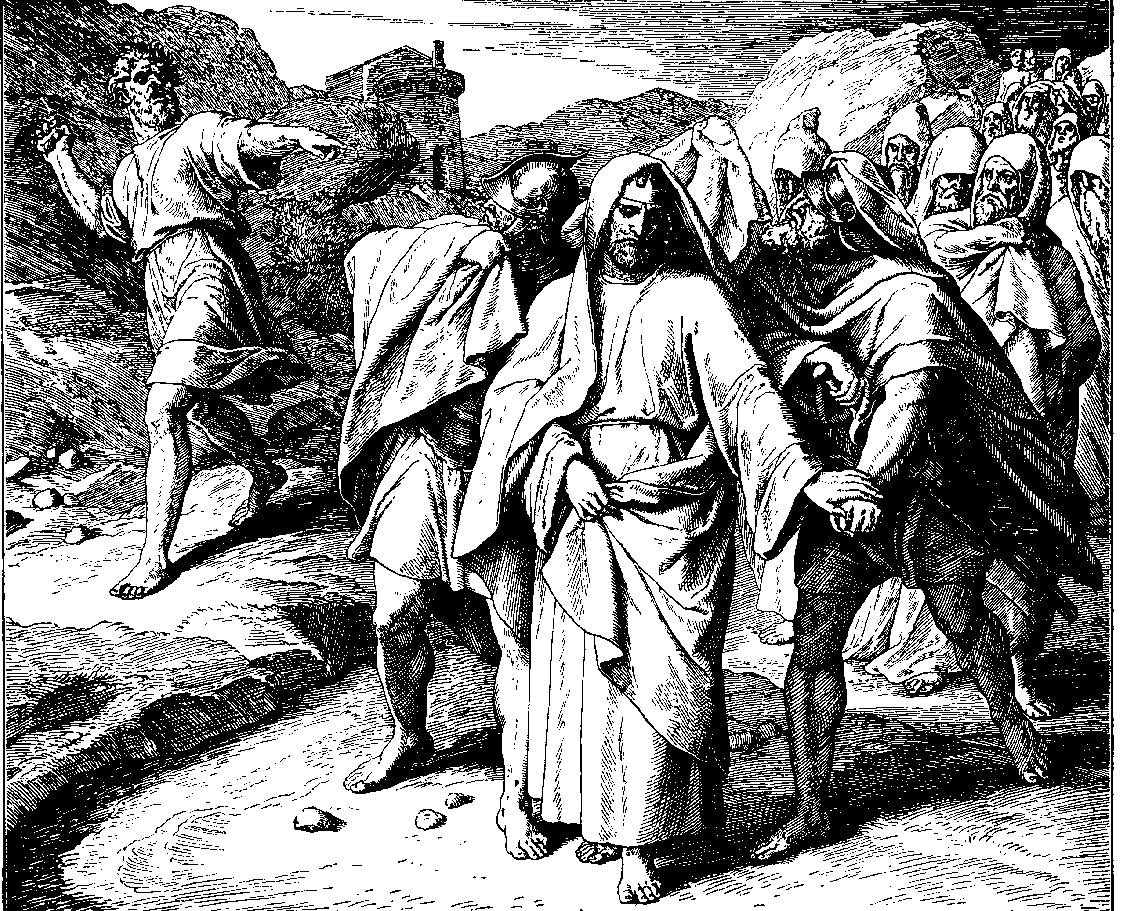
Shimei curses David, 1860 woodcut by Julius Schnorr von Karolsfeld

Attested in English from 1753, harassment derives from the English verb harass plus the suffix -ment. The verb harass, in turn, is a loan word from the French, which was already attested in 1572 meaning torment, annoyance, bother, trouble and later as of 1609 was also referred to the condition of being exhausted, overtired. Of the French verb harasser itself there are the first records in a Latin to French translation of 1527 of Thucydides' History of the war that was between the Peloponnesians and the Athenians both in the countries of the Greeks and the Romans and the neighboring places wherein the translator writes harasser allegedly meaning harceler (to exhaust the enemy by repeated raids); and in the military chant Chanson du franc archer of 1562, where the term is referred to a gaunt jument (de poil fauveau, tant maigre et harassée: of fawn horsehair, so meagre and ...) where it is supposed that the verb is used meaning overtired.

A hypothesis about the origin of the verb harasser is harace/harache, which was used in the 14th century in expressions like courre à la harache (to pursue) and prendre aucun par la harache (to take somebody under constraint). The Französisches Etymologisches Wörterbuch, a German etymological dictionary of the French language (1922–2002) compares phonetically and syntactically both harace and harache to the interjection hare and haro by alleging a pejorative and augmentative form. The latter was an exclamation indicating distress and emergency (recorded since 1180) but is also reported later in 1529 in the expression crier haro sur (to arise indignation over somebody). Hare's use is already reported in 1204 as an order to finish public activities as fairs or markets and later (1377) still as command but referred to dogs. This dictionary suggests a relation of haro/hare with the old lower Franconian *hara (here) (as by bringing a dog to heel).

While the pejorative of an exclamation and in particular of such an exclamation is theoretically possible for the first word (harace) and maybe phonetically plausible for harache, a semantic, syntactic and phonetic similarity of the verb harasser as used in the first popular attestation (the chant mentioned above) with the word haras should be kept in mind: Already in 1160 haras indicated a group of horses constrained together for the purpose of reproduction and in 1280 it also indicated the enclosure facility itself, where those horses are constrained. The origin itself of harass is thought to be the old Scandinavian hârr with the Romanic suffix –as, which meant grey or dimmish horsehair. Controversial is the etymological relation to the Arabic word for horse whose roman transliteration is faras.

Although the French origin of the word 'harassment' is beyond all question in the Oxford English Dictionary and those dictionaries basing on it, a supposed Old French verb harer should be the origin of the French verb harasser, despite the fact that this verb cannot be found in French etymologic dictionaries like that of the Centre national de resources textuelles et lexicales or the Trésor de la langue française informatisé (see also their corresponding websites as indicated in the interlinks); since the entry further alleges a derivation from hare, like in the mentioned German etymological dictionary of the French language a possible misprint of harer = har/ass/er = harasser is plausible or cannot be excluded. In those dictionaries the relationship with harassment were an interpretation of the interjection hare as to urge a dog to attack, despite the fact that it should indicate a shout to come and not to go (hare = hara = here; cf. above). The American Heritage Dictionary prudently indicates this origin only as possible.

== Types ==
=== Online ===
Online harassment may direct multiple repeating obscenities, unwanted behaviour or unpleasant comments at specific people. It can include sharing information about a person they did not want shared, posting unpleasant comments, pictures or videos; and online impersonation.

Some online harassment may focus on the victims characteristics such as age, sex, race, religion, gender, nationality, disability, or sexual orientation. This is discrimination.

Online harassment can occur on social media, in chat rooms, within gaming environments or by sending unpleasant and unwanted emails to people who do not want to receive these communications and are offended by them.

Online harassment may involve using photos of the victim and their families, altering photos in offensive ways, and then posting them on social media with the aim of causing emotional distress (see cyberbullying, cyberstalking, hate crime, online predator, Online Gender-Based Violence, and stalking).

Herd mentality and cyberbullying are common on social media platforms. The "social media mob" that formed may evolve to "bullying anyone who didn't align with their beliefs or conclusions".

=== Trolling ===
A 120 person US-based survey found that Trolling can be defined as harassment when its based on race or gender. In recent years, many politicians have experienced trolling and it has been identified as having a significant impact on political discourse.

=== Police ===
Unfair treatment conducted by law officials, including but not limited to excessive force, profiling, threats and coercion, that may be related to characteristics such as disability, race, ethnicity, religious beliefs, gender/sexual, age, or other forms of discrimination. Such behaviour would violate dignity or create a hostile, degrading, humiliating or offensive environment. Police harassment is unlawful and may be a violation of a person's human rights.

=== Power ===
Power harassment is harassment or unwelcome attention of a political nature, often occurring in the environment of a workplace including hospitals, schools and universities. It includes a range of behavior from mild irritation and annoyances to serious abuses which can even involve forced activity beyond the boundaries of the job description. Power harassment is considered a form of illegal discrimination and is a form of political and psychological abuse, and bullying.

=== Psychological ===
This is humiliating, intimidating or abusive behavior which is often difficult to detect, leaving no evidence other than victim reports or complaints. This characteristically lowers a person's self-esteem or causes one to have overwhelming torment. This can take the form of verbal comments, engineered episodes of intimidation, aggressive actions or repeated gestures. Falling into this category is workplace harassment by individuals or groups mobbing.

=== Landlord ===
Landlord harassment is the willing creation of conditions that are uncomfortable for one or more tenants in order to induce willing abandonment of a rental contract. Such a strategy is often sought because it avoids costly legal expenses and potential problems with eviction. This kind of activity is common in regions where rent control laws exist, but which do not allow the direct extension of rent-controlled prices from one tenancy to the subsequent tenancy, thus allowing landlords to set higher prices.

Landlord harassment carries specific legal penalties in some jurisdictions, but enforcement can be difficult in some circumstances. However, when a crime is committed in the process and motives similar to those described above are subsequently proven in court, then those motives may be considered an aggravating factor in many jurisdictions, thus subjecting the offender(s) to a stiffer sentence.

Examples of behaviour that is landlord harassment and is a criminal offence in some jurisdictions includes opening or withholding post, entering a persons home without permission, removing or interfering with belongings and violent and intimidating language or behaviour. Landlords should also be aware that in some jurisdictions, the legal responsibilities they have in regards to harassment, extend to ensuring their tenants are not harassing other people.

=== Disability ===
Disability harassment occurs when a person finds the behaviour towards them offensive, frightening, degrading, humiliating or distressing and the motivation for this is a person's disability. In many jurisdictions, it is unlawful. It is a type of discrimination. Data in the UK and Europe suggests it is a common type of harassment, that also occurs in the workplace.

=== Racial ===
Racial harassment involves a series of incidents that are targeted at a person, due to their race, colour, nationality or ethnicity. The harassment may include words, intimidation, causing offence and harm and actions that are specifically designed to make the person feel degraded. Examples of such behaviour includes derogatory name calling, verbal threats, insults, racist jokes and displaying racially offensive material. This is discrimination and is unlawful in many jurisdictions.

=== Religious ===
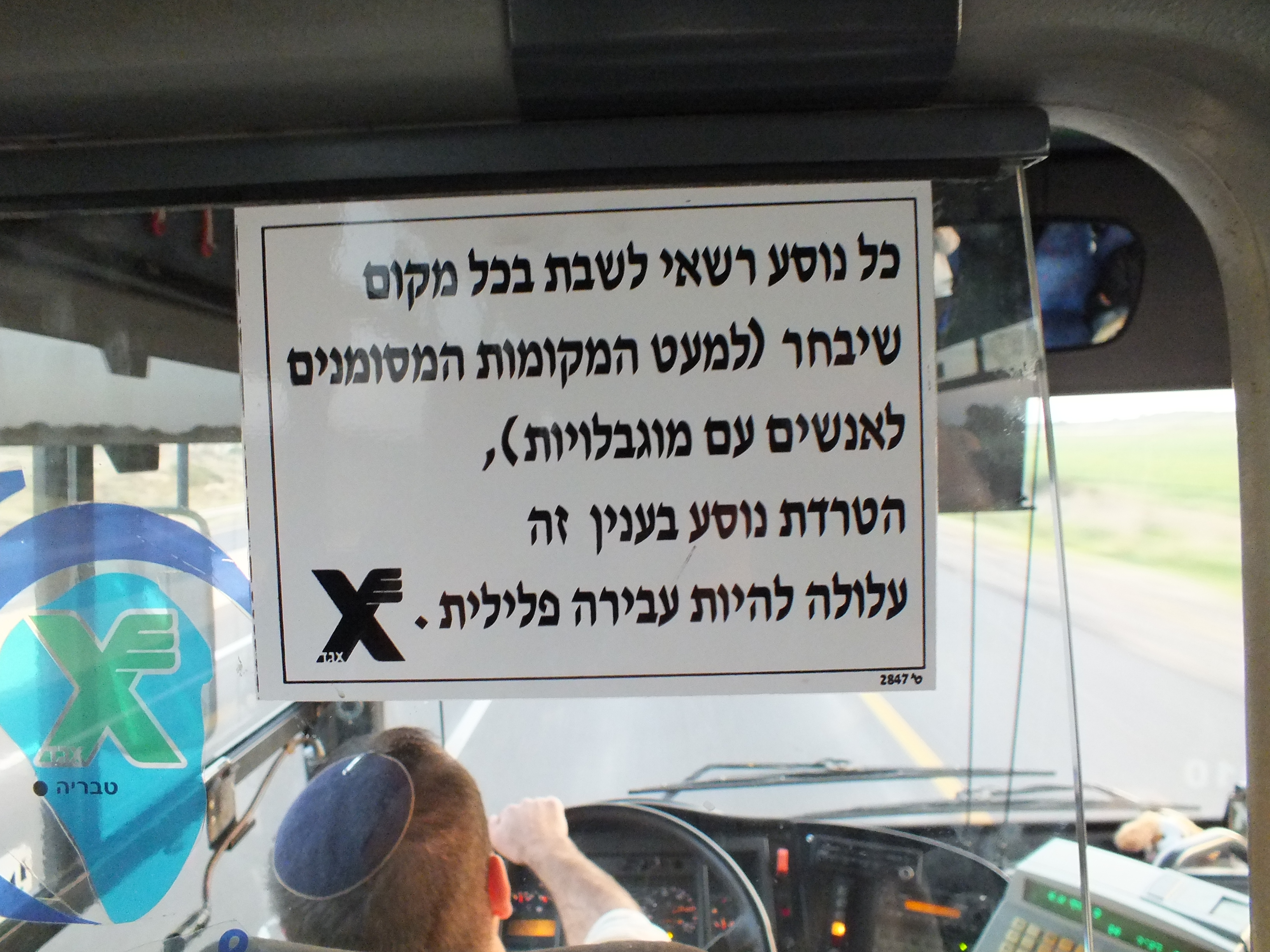
Notice to passengers posted behind bus driver, in Hebrew: "Every passenger may take any seat they choose (excepting places marked for disabled persons); harassing a passenger in this regard may be a criminal offence".

Religious persecution is verbal, psychological or physical harassment against targets because they choose to practice a specific religion. Religious abuse is abuse due to religious settings. Religious harassment can include coercion into forced conversion.

=== Sexual ===
Sexual harassment is an offensive or humiliating behavior that is related to a person's sex. It can be a subtle or overt sexual nature of a person (sexual annoyance, e.g. flirting, expression of sexuality, etc.) that results in wrong communication or miscommunication, implied sexual conditions of a job (sexual coercion, etc.). It includes unwanted and unwelcome words, facial expressions, sexual attention, deeds, actions, symbols, or behaviors of a sexual nature that make the target feel uncomfortable. This can involve visual or suggestive looks or comments, staring at a person's body, or the showing of inappropriate photos. It can happen anywhere, but is most common in the workplace, schools, and the military. Even if certain civility codes were relevant in the past, the changing cultural norms calls for policies to avoid intentional fallacies between sexes and among same sexes. Women are substantially more likely to be affected than men.

=== Workplace ===
Workplace harassment is the offensive, belittling or threatening behavior directed at an individual worker or a group of workers. Workplace harassment can be verbal, physical, sexual, racial, or bullying.

Recently, matters of workplace harassment have gained interest among practitioners and researchers as it is becoming one of the most sensitive areas of effective workplace management. In some East Asian countries, it has attracted substantial attention from researchers and governments since the 1980s, because aggressive behaviors have become a significant source of work stress, as reported by employees. Under occupational health and safety laws around the world, workplace harassment and workplace bullying are identified as being core psychosocial hazards.

=== Electronic ===
Electronic harassment is the unproven belief of the use of electromagnetic waves to harass a victim. Psychologists have identified evidence of auditory hallucinations, delusional disorders, or other mental disorders in online communities supporting those who claim to be targeted.

== Laws ==
=== United States ===
Harassment, under the laws of the United States, is defined as any repeated or continuing uninvited contact that serves no useful purpose beyond creating alarm, annoyance, or emotional distress. In 1964, the United States Congress passed Title VII of the Civil Rights Act which prohibited discrimination at work on the basis of race, color, religion, national origin and sex. This later became the legal basis for early harassment law. The practice of developing workplace guidelines prohibiting harassment was pioneered in 1969, when the U.S. Department of Defense drafted a Human Goals Charter, establishing a policy of equal respect for both sexes. In Meritor Savings Bank v. Vinson, 477 U.S. 57 (1986): the U.S. Supreme Court recognized harassment suits against employers for promoting a sexually hostile work environment. In 2006, President George W. Bush signed a law which prohibited the transmission of annoying messages over the Internet (aka spamming) without disclosing the sender's true identity. An important standard in U.S. federal harassment law is that to be unlawful, the offending behavior either must be "severe or pervasive enough to create a work environment that a reasonable person would consider intimidating, hostile, or abusive", or that enduring the offensive conduct becomes a condition of continued employment; e.g. if the employee is fired or threatened with firing upon reporting the conduct.

==== New Jersey's Law Against Discrimination ("LAD") ====
The LAD prohibits employers from discriminating in any job-related action, including recruitment, interviewing, hiring, promotions, discharge, compensation and the terms, conditions and privileges of employment on the basis of any of the law's specified protected categories. These protected categories are race, creed, color, national origin, nationality, ancestry, age, sex (including pregnancy and sexual harassment), marital status, domestic partnership status, affectional or sexual orientation, atypical hereditary cellular or blood trait, genetic information, liability for military service, or mental or physical disability, including HIV/AIDS and related illnesses. The LAD prohibits intentional discrimination based on any of these characteristics. Intentional discrimination may take the form of differential treatment or statements and conduct that reflect discriminatory animus or bias.

=== Canada ===
In 1984, the Canadian Human Rights Act prohibited sexual harassment in workplaces under federal jurisdiction.

=== United Kingdom ===
In the UK, there are a number of laws protecting people from harassment, including the Protection from Harassment Act 1997 and the Criminal Justice and Police Act 2001. The Crime and Disorder Act 1998 creates racially or religiously aggravated versions of the Protection from Harassment Act 1997 offences, which have harsher penalties. Where a Protection from Harassment Act 1997 offence involves hostility based upon sexual orientation, transgender identity or disability then the sentence uplift provisions of the Sentencing Act 2020 apply. The Malicious Communications Act 1988 makes it an offence to send communications that may cause anxiety and distress. Harassment is unlawful under the Equality Act 2010. The Protection from Eviction Act 1977, deals with some types of landlord harassment.

=== Australia ===
A number of laws are relevant to harassment that is motivated by discrimination, for example the Age Discrimination Act 2004, Disability Discrimination Act 1992, Racial Discrimination Act 1975 and Sex Discrimination Act 1984. Other laws deal with online harassment and cyberbullying. The Fair Work Act bans sexual harassment in the workplace, amongst offering other work based protections.

=== Sweden ===
There are a number of crimes in Sweden that could be described as harassment. Many different forms of harassment are classified as molestation in chapter 4 section 7 of the swedish criminal code, which encompasses actions such as physically disturbing someone, making loud, disturbing noises, filming them in an intrusive manner, sending threats of suicide. Most types of sexual harassment falls under the term sexual molestation in chapter 6 section 10 of the swedish criminal code, which encompasses acts such as flashing, making sexual comments and touching someone in certain, sexual manners.

== See also ==
- Trolling
- Psychological warfare
- Sexual assault
- Sexual Assault Awareness Month
- Toxic masculinity
- Workplace aggression
