= Kurt Baldinger =

Swiss linguist and philologist

Kurt Baldinger (November 17, 1919 – January 17, 2007) was a Swiss linguist and philologist who made important contributions to Romance studies in the Gallo-Romanic and Ibero-Romanic branches, with works of lexicography, historical linguistics, etymology and semantics.

== Life and work ==
Kurt Baldinger was born in Binningen, near Basel. At the age of twelve, he lost his father, who was a professor of secondary education. After finishing high school in 1938, he went to work as a physical education instructor at a secondary school while he studied at the Universities of Geneva and Basel, graduating as a professor of middle and higher education in the disciplines of Germanic and French philology and history. In 1947 he married Heidi Isler, with whom he had four daughters. In 1948 he earned a doctorate at the University of Basel. His thesis, Collective suffixes and the concept of collectivity in French, under the direction of eminent romanist Walther von Wartburg. He became a disciple of von Wartburg and one of his principal collaborators on his Französisches Etymologisches Wörterbuch (French Etymological Dictionary), which reached twenty-five volumes.

Being a Swiss citizen like his teacher, Baldinger was able to cross the borders of the Cold War. Thus, he could be employed as a professor at Humboldt University of Berlin in the German Democratic Republic, following von Wartburg as Head of Romance Linguistics and Philology, where he remained until 1957. He moved to the University of Heidelberg, where he stayed for the rest of his life. (He retained his post as director of the Romance Languages Institute of the Academy of Sciences in East Berlin until 1962.) In 1958, at 39 years old, Baldinger was elected member of the Academy of Sciences in Heidelberg, one of the most prestigious academies in Germany.

Baldinger's dedication to Romance studies focused primarily on the Gallo-Romanic sphere. Besides his contribution to the Französisches Etymologisches Wörterbuch (French Etymological Dictionary) for which he is the author of at least ninety extensive articles, and of numerous monographs, he stands out for the launch of two major dictionaries: Dictionnaire onomasiologique de l'ancien occitan (Onomasiological Dictionary of Old Occitan), which later was merged into the Dictionnaire onomasiologique de l'ancien gascon (Onomasiological Dictionary of Old Gascon), as well as Dictionnaire étymologique de l'ancien français (DEAF) (Etymological Dictionary of Old French) (1971). As its name indicates, the first dictionary is onomasiological; that is, it is organized by concept, while the second (DEAF) is organized by etymological families. Baldinger originally published his Teoría semántica: Hacia una semántica moderna (Semantic Theory: Toward a Modern Semantics) (Madrid, Alcalá, 1970 and 1976) in Spanish.

Baldinger's productivity was enormous: a tribute collection, published to mark his seventieth birthday, included 70 monographs, 261 articles and 1,890 reviews. The amazing number of reviews is partly explained by the fact that Baldinger had headed the Zeischrift für romanische Philologie, one of the most prestigious journals in Romance studies, since 1958.

His academic career progressed through the years. After having served as dean of the School of Philosophy, he was elected chancellor of the University of Heidelberg. This coincided with the student disturbances that broke out in May 1968, when police intervention was required to clear out the university auditorium. He earned several honorary doctoral degrees, especially from Spanish and Latin American universities., and was elected to the American Philosophical Society in 1976.

After retirement, Baldinger suffered from limitations stemming from blindness and the complications of a stroke in his last years. He died in 2007, at age 87. His conception of philological study is reflected in the title of one of his articles: "Language and Culture". He didn't think of language as an isolated entity, but rather one framed in the sphere of activities of human beings.

== Bibliography ==
- Germà Colón DOMÈNECH: "Necrología: Kurt Baldinger (1919-2007)", Revista de Filología Española (RFE), LXXXVII, 1.º, 2007, pp. 197–199.
- Helmut LÜDTKE: "Kurt Baldinger (1919-2007), Llengua & Literatura, núm. 19 (2008), pp. 577-578.
- Wolfgang Raible: "Kurt Baldinger: 17 November 1919 - 17 January 2007". Proceedings of the American Philosophical Society, vol.153, n.º 2, June 2009, pp. 222–224.
- José Luis Rivarola: "Kurt Baldinger (1919-2007)", Estudis Romànics, 30, 2008, pp. 621–624.
