= Paul Zumthor =

Swiss medievalist, literary historian and linguist

Paul Zumthor, CQ (5 August 1915 – 11 January 1995) was a medievalist, literary historian, and linguist. He was a Swiss from Geneva.

== Biography ==
He studied in Paris with Gustave Cohen and worked on French etymology with Walther von Wartburg. In studying medieval French poetry, he formulated the concept of mouvance (variability). He also emphasised "vocality" in medieval poetry, the place of the human voice.

He held two major professorial positions at the University of Amsterdam from 1952 and at the Université de Montréal from 1971 to 1980, when he later became emeritus. In 1992, he was made a Knight of the National Order of Quebec.

Zumthor was elected a member of the Royal Netherlands Academy of Arts and Sciences in 1969, this was changed into a foreign membership in 1971.

== Legacy ==
Within J. M. Coetzee's novel Elizabeth Costello, Zumthor is quoted at length by a character Emmanuel Egudu. Coetzee describes Zumthor as "a man from the snowy wastes of Canada, the great scholar of orality Paul Zumthor."

== Works ==
- Merlin le prophète. Un thème de la littérature polémique, de l'historiographie et des romans (1943)
- Antigone ou l'espérance. (1945)
- Victor Hugo poète de Satan (1946)
- Saint Bernard de Clairvaux (1947) with Albert Béguin
- Positions actuelles de la linguistique et de l'histoire littéraire (1948)
- Lettres de Héloïse et Abélard (1950)
- Abréviations composées (1951)
- L'Inventio dans la poésie française archaïque (1952)
- Miroirs de l'Amour. Tragédie et Préciosité (1952)
- Histoire littéraire de la France médiévale (VIe-XIVe siècles). (1954)
- Charles le Chauve (1957)
- La griffe, Paris (1957)
- Précis de syntaxe du francais contemporain (1958) with Walther von Wartburg
- La Vie quotidienne en Hollande au temps De Rembrandt (1960) as Daily Life in Rembrandt's Holland (1962) translated by Simon Watson Taylor
- Les Contrebandiers (1962)
- Langue et techniques poétiques à l'époque romane (XIe - XIIIe siècles) (1963)
- Un prêtre montheysan et le sac de Liège en 1468. 'La Complainte de la Cité de Liège', poème inédit. (1963) editor with Willem Nooman
- Guillaume le Conquérant et la civilisation de son temps (1964)
- Roman et Gothique: deux aspects de la poésie médiévale (1966)
- Essai de poétique médiévale (1972)
- Langue, texte, énigme (1975)
- Anthologie des grands rhétoriqueurs (1978)
- La Masque et la lumière (1978)
- Parler du Moyen âge (1980) translated as Speaking of the Middle Ages (1986) by Sarah White
- Introduction à la poésie orale (1983) as Oral Poetry: An Introduction (1990) by Kathryn Murphy-Judy
- La Poésie et la Voix dans la civilisation médiévale (1984)
- Jeux de mémoire: aspects de la mnémotechnie médiévale (1986) with Bruno Roy
- Midi le Juste (1986) poems
- La Fête des fous (1987) novel
- La Lettre et la Voix (1987)
- Point de fuite (1989)
- Écriture et nomadisme: entretiens et essais (1990)
- La Traversée (1991)
- La mesure du monde (1993)
- La Porte à côté (1994)
- Fin en Soi (1996) poems
- Babel ou l'inachèvement (1997)
