= Max Pfister =

Swiss romanist

Max Pfister (21 April 1932 – 21 October 2017) was a Swiss Romance studies scholar and linguist.

He is the initiator of the LEI (Lessico etimologico italiano), which deals with Italian and German research of etymology and dialectology of the Italian language, now directed together with Wolfgang Schweickard .

== Selected publications ==
- Pfister, Max: Lessico etimologico italiano, Wiesbaden, Reichert, 1979ff.

== Honors ==
- Mainzer Akademie der Wissenschaften, Socio corrispondente straniero der Accademia della Crusca
- Premio Galileo Galilei dei Rotary Italiani
- Diploma di 1 Classe con Medaglia d'Oro ai Benemeriti della Cultura e dell'Arte, conferred by the Italian president Carlo Azeglio Ciampi, 2006
