= Maas's law =

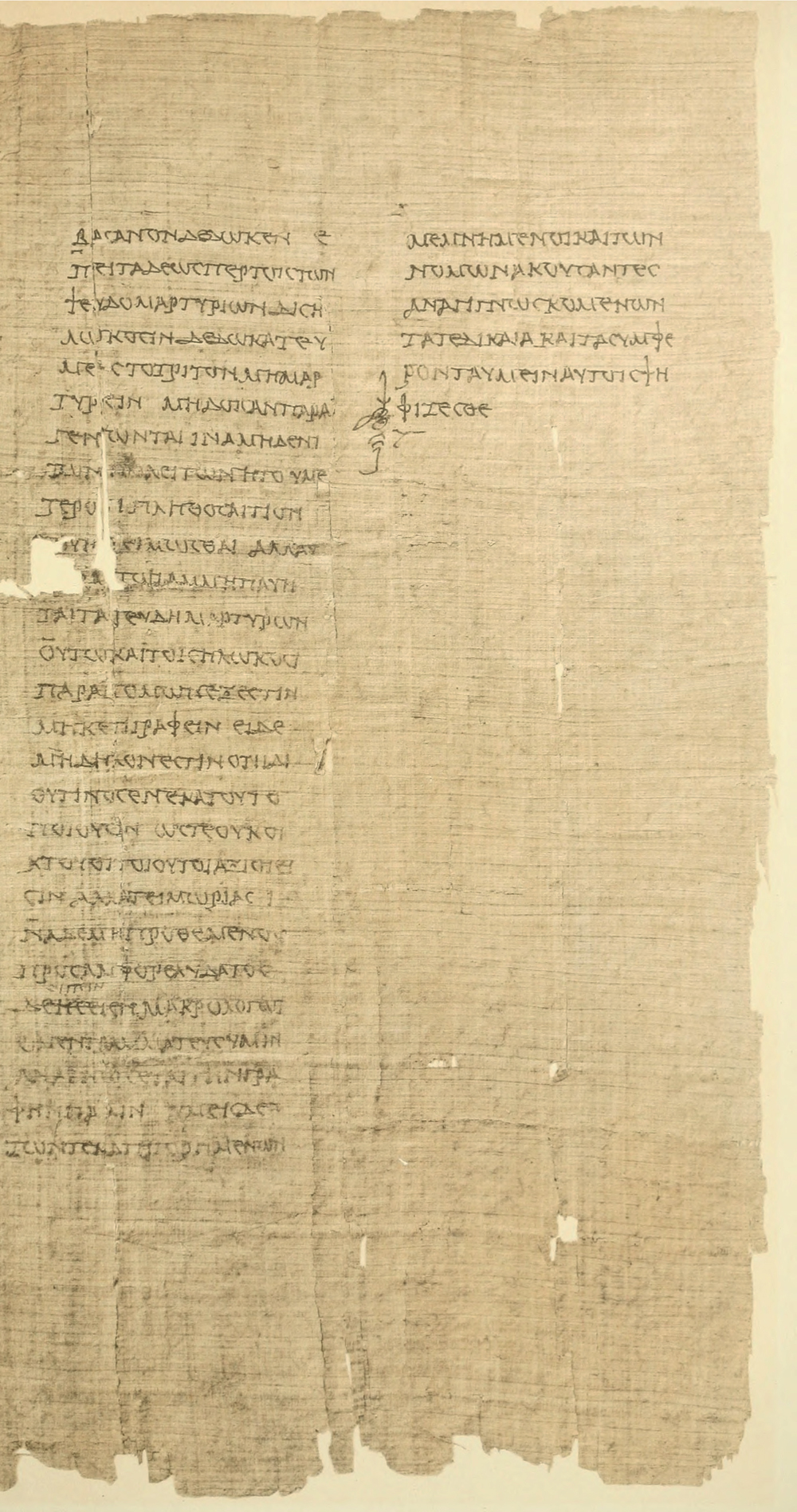
A fine example of Maas's Law is found in the final two columns of P.Lit.Lond. 134, the 2nd century BCE papyrus that transmits the conclusion to Hypereides' Against Philippides.

In papyrology, Maas's law—named after classical scholar Paul Maas (1880–1964)—is the observation that columns in bookrolls often exhibit a forward tilt such that both edges of a column gradually move to the left as the column progresses. In other words, the bottommost line of the column of text is further to the left than the uppermost line. William Johnson has argued that this tilt was deliberate and formed part of the bookroll's design.
