= Lessico etimologico italiano =

The Lessico etimologico italiano (LEI) is an etymological dictionary of the Italian language.

It has been published since 1979 by the Akademie der Wissenschaften und der Literatur in Mainz, Germany under the direction of Max Pfister and Wolfgang Schweickard.

  - 1979. — Vol. 1. Lfg. 01. — 96 p.
  - 1980. — Vol. 1. Lfg. 02. — 96 p.
  - 1981. — Vol. 1. Lfg. 03. — 96 p.
  - 1982. — Vol. 1. Lfg. 04. — 96 p.
  - 1982. — Vol. 1. Lfg. 05. — 96 p.
  - 1982. — Vol. 1. Lfg. 06. — 96 p.
  - 1983. — Vol. 1. Lfg. 07. — 96 p.
  - 1984. — Vol. 1. Lfg. 08. — 96 p.
  - 1984. — Vol. 1. Ab—alburnus. — 780 p. — ISBN 3-88226-179-X
  - 1984. — Vol. 2. Lfg. 09. — 96 p.
  - 1984. — Vol. 2. Lfg. 10. — 96 p.
  - 1985. — Vol. 2. Lfg. 11. — 96 p.
  - 1985. — Vol. 2. Lfg. 12. — 96 p.
  - 1986. — Vol. 2. Lfg. 13. — 96 p.
  - 1986. — Vol. 2. Lfg. 14. — 96 p.
  - 1986. — Vol. 2. Lfg. 15. — 96 p.
  - 1987. — Vol. 2. Lfg. 16. — 96 p.
  - 1987. — Vol. 2. Lfg. 17. — 96 p.
  - 1987. — Vol. 2. albus—apertura. — 880 p. — ISBN 3-88226-392-X
  - 1987. — Vol. 3.1. Lfg. 18. — 96 p.
  - 1987. — Vol. 3.1. Lfg. 19. — 96 p.
  - 1987. — Vol. 3.1. Lfg. 20. — 96 p.
  - 1988. — Vol. 3.1. Lfg. 21. — 96 p.
  - 1988. — Vol. 3.1. Lfg. 22. — 96 p.
  - 1988. — Vol. 3.1. Lfg. 23. — 96 p.
  - 1988. — Vol. 3.1. Lfg. 24. — 96 p.
  - 1989. — Vol. 3.1. Lfg. 25. — 96 p.
  - 1989. — Vol. 3.1. Lfg. 26. — 96 p.
  - 1989. — Vol. 3.2. Lfg. 27. — 96 p.
  - 1989. — Vol. 3.2. Lfg. 28. — 96 p.
  - 1990. — Vol. 3.2. Lfg. 29. — 96 p.
  - 1990. — Vol. 3.2. Lfg. 30. — 96 p.
  - 1990. — Vol. 3.2. Lfg. 31. — 96 p.
  - 1991. — Vol. 3.2. Lfg. 32. — 96 p.
  - 1991. — Vol. 3.2. Lfg. 33. — 96 p.
  - 1991. — Vol. 3.2. Lfg. 34. — 96 p.
  - 1991. — Vol. 3.2. Lfg. 35. — 96 p.
  - 1992. — Vol. 3.2. Lfg. 36. — 96 p.
  - 1992. — Vol. 3.1. apertus—asthma. — 876 p. — ISBN 3-88226-499-3
  - 1992. — Vol. 3.2. aspergere—azumus. Indici. — 944 p. — ISBN 3-88226-500-0.
  - 1992. — Vol. 4. Lfg. 37. — 96 p.
  - 1993. — Vol. 4. Lfg. 38. — 96 p.
  - 1993. — Vol. 4. Lfg. 39. — 96 p.
  - 1993. — Vol. 4. Lfg. 40. — 96 p.
  - 1993. — Vol. 4. Lfg. 41. — 96 p.
  - 1994. — Vol. 4. Lfg. 42. — 96 p.
  - 1994. — Vol. 4. Lfg. 43. — 96 p.
  - 1994. — Vol. 4. Lfg. 44. — 96 p.
  - 1994. — Vol. 4. Lfg. 45. — 96 p.
  - 1995. — Vol. 4. Lfg. 46. — 96 p.
  - 1994. — Vol. 4. ba—bassano. — 872 p. — ISBN 3-88226-811-5
  - 1995. — Vol. 5. Lfg. 47. — 96 p.
  - 1995. — Vol. 5. Lfg. 48. — 96 p.
  - 1995. — Vol. 5. Lfg. 49. — 96 p.
  - 1995. — Vol. 5. Lfg. 50. — 96 p.
  - 1996. — Vol. 5. Lfg. 51. — 96 p.
  - 1996. — Vol. 5. Lfg. 52. — 96 p.
  - 1996. — Vol. 5. Lfg. 53. — 96 p.
  - 1997. — Vol. 5. Lfg. 54. — 96 p.
  - 1997. — Vol. 5. Lfg. 55. — 96 p.
  - 1997. — Vol. 5. Lfg. 56. — 96 p.
  - 1997. — Vol. 5. *bassiare—*birotulare. — 868 p. — ISBN 3-88226-847-6
  - 1998. — Vol. 6. Lfg. 57. — 96 p.
  - 1998. — Vol. 6. Lfg. 58. — 96 p.
  - 1998. — Vol. 6. Lfg. 59. — 96 p.
  - 1998. — Vol. 6. Lfg. 60. — 96 p.
  - 1999. — Vol. 6. Lfg. 61. — 96 p.
  - 1999. — Vol. 6. Lfg. 62. — 96 p.
  - 1999. — Vol. 6. Lfg. 63. — 96 p.
  - 1999. — Vol. 6. birrus—brac(c)hiolum. — 864 p. — ISBN 3-89500-028-0
  - 2000. — Vol. 7. Lfg. 64. — 96 p.
  - 2000. — Vol. 7. Lfg. 65. — 96 p.
  - 2000. — Vol. 7. Lfg. 66. — 96 p.
  - 2001. — Vol. 7. Lfg. 67. — 96 p.
  - 2001. — Vol. 7. Lfg. 68. — 96 p.
  - 2001. — Vol. 7. Lfg. 69. — 96 p.
  - 2001. — Vol. 7. Lfg. 70. — 96 p.
  - 2002. — Vol. 7. Lfg. 71. — 96 p.
  - 2002. — Vol. 7. brac(c)hium—bulla. — 800 p. — ISBN 3-89500-149-X
  - 2002. — Vol. 8. Lfg. 72. — 96 p.
  - 2003. — Vol. 8. Lfg. 73. — 96 p.
  - 2003. — Vol. 8. Lfg. 74. — 96 p.
  - 2004. — Vol. 8. Lfg. 75. — 96 p.
  - 2004. — Vol. 8. Lfg. 76. — 360 p.
  - 2004. — Vol. 8. bullare—*bž-, indice. — 1072 p. — ISBN 3-89500-334-4
  - 2004. — Vol. 9. Lfg. 77. — 96 p.
  - 2004. — Vol. 9. Lfg. 78. — 96 p.
  - 2004. — Vol. 9. Lfg. 79. — 96 p.
  - 2005. — Vol. 9. Lfg. 80. — 96 p.
  - 2005. — Vol. 9. Lfg. 81. — 96 p.
  - 2005. — Vol. 9. Lfg. 82. — 96 p.
  - 2005. — Vol. 9. Lfg. 83. — 96 p.
  - 2006. — Vol. 9. Lfg. 84. — 96 p.
  - 2006. — Vol. 9. Lfg. 85. — 124 p.
  - 2006. — Vol. 9. C—cambiāre. — 900 p. — ISBN 3-89500-411-1
  - 2006. — Vol. 10. Lfg. 86. — 96 p. — ISBN 3-89500-521-5
  - 2007. — Vol. 10. Lfg. 87. — 96 p. — ISBN 978-3-89500-522-0
  - 2007. — Vol. 10. Lfg. 88. — 96 p. — ISBN 978-3-89500-523-7
  - 2007. — Vol. 10. Lfg. 89. — 96 p. — ISBN 978-3-89500-524-4
  - 2007. — Vol. 10. Lfg. 90. — 96 p. — ISBN 978-3-89500-525-1
  - 2008. — Vol. 10. Lfg. 91. — 96 p. — ISBN 978-3-89500-526-8
  - 2008. — Vol. 10. Lfg. 92. — 96 p. — ISBN 978-3-89500-527-5
  - 2008. — Vol. 10. Lfg. 93. — 96 p. — ISBN 978-3-89500-611-1
  - 2008. — Vol. 10. Lfg. 94. — 96 p. — ISBN 978-3-89500-612-8
  - 2008. — Vol. 10. cambiare—capitalis. — 876 p. — ISBN 978-3-89500-613-5
  - 2009. — Vol. 11. Lfg. 95. — 96 p. — ISBN 978-3-89500-614-2
  - 2009. — Vol. 11. Lfg. 96. — 96 p. — ISBN 978-3-89500-615-9
  - 2009. — Vol. 11. Lfg. 97. — 96 p. — ISBN 978-3-89500-616-6
  - 2009. — Vol. 11. Lfg. 98. — 96 p. — ISBN 978-3-89500-617-3
  - 2009. — Vol. 11. Lfg. 99. — 96 p. — ISBN 978-3-89500-618-0
  - 2009. — Vol. 11. Lfg. 100. — 96 p. — ISBN 978-3-89500-619-7
  - 2010. — Vol. 11. Lfg. 101. — 96 p. — ISBN 978-3-89500-745-3
  - 2010. — Vol. 11. Lfg. 102. — 104 p. — ISBN 978-3-89500-746-0
  - 2011. — Vol. 11. capitaneus—*cardare. — 780 p. — ISBN 978-3-89500-747-7
  - 2010. — Vol. 12. Lfg. 103. — 96 p. — ISBN 978-3-89500-770-5
  - 2010. — Vol. 12. Lfg. 104. — 96 p. — ISBN 978-3-89500-773-6
  - 2010. — Vol. 12. Lfg. 105. — 96 p. — ISBN 978-3-89500-799-6
  - 2011. — Vol. 12. Lfg. 106. — 96 p. — ISBN 978-3-89500-832-0
  - 2011. — Vol. 12. Lfg. 107. — 96 p. — ISBN 978-3-89500-833-7
  - 2011. — Vol. 12. Lfg. 108. — 96 p. — ISBN 978-3-89500-867-2
  - 2012. — Vol. 12. Lfg. 109. — 96 p. — ISBN 978-3-89500-878-8
  - 2012. — Vol. 12. Lfg. 110. — 118 p. — ISBN 978-3-89500-879-5
  - 2012. — Vol. 12. *cardeus—katl-. — 792 p. — ISBN 978-3-89500-882-5
  - 2012. — Vol. 13. Lfg. 111. — 96 p. — ISBN 978-3-89500-900-6
  - 2012. — Vol. 13. Lfg. 112. — 96 p. — ISBN 978-3-89500-901-3
  - 2012. — Vol. 13. Lfg. 113. — 96 p. — ISBN 978-3-89500-933-4
  - 2013. — Vol. 13. Lfg. 114. — 96 p. — ISBN 978-3-89500-973-0
  - 2013. — Vol. 13. Lfg. 115. — 96 p. — ISBN 978-3-89500-992-1
  - 2014. — Vol. 13. Lfg. 116. — 96 p. — ISBN 978-3-95490-029-9
  - 2014. — Vol. 13. Lfg. 117. — 96 p. — ISBN 978-3-95490-061-9
  - 2014. — Vol. 13. Lfg. 118. — 112 p. — ISBN 978-3-95490-079-4
  - 2015. — Vol. 13. cat(t)ia—c(h)ordula. — 780 p. — ISBN 978-3-95490-082-4
  - 2015. — Vol. 14. Lfg. 119. — 96 p. — ISBN 978-3-95490-096-1
  - 2015. — Vol. 14. Lfg. 120. — 96 p. — ISBN 978-3-95490-157-9
  - 2016. — Vol. 14. Lfg. 121. — 96 p. — ISBN 978-3-95490-168-5
  - 2016. — Vol. 14. Lfg. 122. — 96 p. — ISBN 978-3-95490-180-7
  - 2016. — Vol. 14. Lfg. 123. — 96 p. — ISBN 978-3-95490-220-0
  - 2016. — Vol. 14. Lfg. 124. — 96 p. — ISBN 978-3-95490-223-1
  - 2017. — Vol. 14. Lfg. 125. — 96 p. — ISBN 978-3-95490-239-2
  - 2017. — Vol. 14. Lfg. 126. — 96 p. — ISBN 978-3-95490-285-9
  - 2017. — Vol. 14. chorus—clepsydra — 768 p. — ISBN 978-3-95490-284-2
  - 2017. — Vol. 15. Lfg. 127. — 96 p. — ISBN 978-3-95490-305-4
  - 2018. — Vol. 15. Lfg. 128. — 96 p. — ISBN 978-3-95490-334-4
  - 2018. — Vol. 15. Lfg. 129. — 96 p. — ISBN 978-3-95490-382-5
  - 2018. — Vol. 15. Lfg. 130. — 96 p. — ISBN 978-3-95490-390-0
  - 2019. — Vol. 15. Lfg. 131. — 96 p. — ISBN 978-3-95490-408-2
  - 2019. — Vol. 15. Lfg. 132. — 96 p. — ISBN 978-3-95490-425-9
  - 2019. — Vol. 15. Lfg. 133. — 96 p. — ISBN 978-3-95490-462-4
  - 2020. — Vol. 15. Lfg. 134. — 116 p. — ISBN 978-3-95490-464-8
  - 2020. — Vol. 15. *clērica—committere. — 792 p., ISBN 978-3-95490-480-8
  - 2020. — Vol. 16. Lfg. 135. — 96 p. — ISBN 978-3-95490-515-7
  - 2020. — Vol. 16. Lfg. 136. — 96 p. — ISBN 978-3-95490-516-4
  - 2021. — Vol. 16. Lfg. 137. — 96 p. — ISBN 978-3-7520-0577-6
  - 2021. — Vol. 16. Lfg. 138. — 96 p. — ISBN 978-3-7520-0580-6
  - 2021. — Vol. 16. Lfg. 139. — 96 p. — ISBN 978-3-7520-0584-4
  - 2021. — Vol. 16. Lfg. 140. — 96 p. — ISBN 978-3-7520-0643-8
  - 2021. — Vol. 16. Lfg. 141. — 96 p. — ISBN 978-3-7520-0644-5
  - 2022. — Vol. 16. Lfg. 142. — 96 p. — ISBN 978-3-7520-0646-9
  - 2022. — Vol. 16. commixtio—conformator. — 768 p., ISBN
  - 2022. — Vol. 17. Lfg. 143 — 96 p. — ISBN 978-3-7520-0659-9
  - ...
  - 2007. — Lfg. D 1. — 96 p. — ISBN 978-3-89500-610-4
  - 2009. — Lfg. D 2. — 96 p. — ISBN 978-3-89500-686-9
  - 2010. — Lfg. D 3. — 96 p. — ISBN 978-3-89500-748-4
  - 2011. — Lfg. D 4. — 96 p. — ISBN 978-3-89500-834-4
  - 2011. — Lfg. D 5. — 96 p. — ISBN 978-3-89500-873-3
  - 2012. — Lfg. D 6. — 96 p. — ISBN 978-3-89500-902-0
  - 2013. — Lfg. D 7. — 96 p. — ISBN 978-3-89500-974-7
  - 2014. — Lfg. D 8. — 112 p. — ISBN 978-3-95490-030-5
  - 2016. — Vol. 19. da—detentor. — 740 p. — ISBN 978-3-95490-083-1
  - 2014. — Lfg. D 9. — 96 p. — ISBN 978-3-95490-100-5
  - 2016. — Lfg. D 10. — 96 p. — ISBN 978-3-95490-224-8
  - 2017. — Lfg. D 11. — 96 p. — ISBN 978-3-95490-244-6
  - 2021. — Lfg. D 12. — 96 p. — ISBN 978-3-7520-0635-3
  - ...
  - 2011. — Lfg. E 1. — 96 p. — ISBN 978-3-89500-827-6
  - 2013. — Lfg. E 2. — 96 p. — ISBN 978-3-89500-996-9
  - 2014. — Lfg. E 3. — 96 p. — ISBN 978-3-95490-062-6
  - 2016. — Lfg. E 4. — 96 p. — ISBN 978-3-95490-225-5
  - 2018. — Lfg. E 5. — 96 p. — ISBN 978-3-95490-316-0
  - 2019. — Lfg. E 6. — 96 p. — ISBN 978-3-95490-421-1
  - 2021. — Lfg. E 7. — 96 p. — ISBN 978-3-7520-0576-9
  - 2021. — Lfg. E 8. — 94 p. — ISBN 978-3-7520-0633-9
  - 2021. — Vol. 21. E—excrescere. — 740 p. —
  - 2022. — Lfg. E 9. — 96 p. — ISBN 978-3-7520-0660-5
  - 2022. — Lfg. E 10. — 96 p.
  - 2022. — Lfg. E 11. — 96 p.
  - ...
  - 2000. — Germanismi Vol. 1, Fasc. 1. — 96 p. — ISBN 3-89500-172-4
  - 2002. — Germanismi Vol. 1, Fasc. 2. — 96 p. — ISBN 3-89500-173-2
  - 2003. — Germanismi Vol. 1, Fasc. 3. — 96 p. — ISBN 3-89500-174-0
  - 2007. — Germanismi Vol. 1, fasc. 4. — 96 p. — ISBN 978-3-89500-175-8
  - 2009. — Germanismi Vol. 1, fasc. 5. — 96 p. — ISBN 978-3-89500-176-5
  - 2010. — Germanismi Vol. 1, fasc. 6. — 96 p. — ISBN 978-3-89500-749-1
  - 2011. — Germanismi Vol. 1, fasc. 7. — 96 p. — ISBN 978-3-89500-874-0
  - 2015. — Germanismi Vol. 1, fasc. 8/9. — 164 p. — ISBN 978-3-95490-158-6
  - 2016. — Germanismi Vol. 1. Abschied-putzn. — 840 p. — ISBN 978-3-95490-159-3
  - …
  - 2002. — Supplemento bibliografico. — VI, 395 p. — ISBN 3-89500-277-1
  - 2012. — Supplemento bibliografico IV. — 448 p. — ISBN 978-3-89500-886-3
  - 1992. — Etymologie Und Wortgeschichte Des Italienischen — Genesi E Dimensioni Di Un Vocabolario Etimologico. — 252 p. — ISBN 3-88226-534-5
  - 2012. — Le nuove frontiere del LEI. — 224 p. — ISBN 978-3-89500-885-6
