= Human Fertility (British Fertility Society journal) =

Human Fertility (Cambridge)
- Discipline: Obstetrics and gynaecology
- Language: English

Publication details
- Former name: Journal of the British Fertility Society
- History: Start Year: 1998, Continues: Journal of the British Fertility Society
- Publisher: Taylor & Francis, British Fertility Society (England)

Standard abbreviations
- ISO 4: Hum. Fertil. (Camb.)

Indexing
- ISSN: 1464-7273

Human Fertility is one of two academic journals with this title. Both journals deal with topics regarding human reproduction. This journal is published by the British Fertility Society.
