= Remigio Sabbadini =

Italian classical philologist

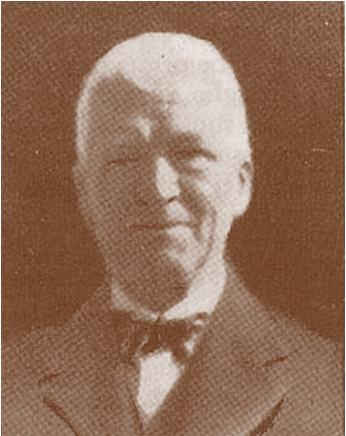

Remigio Sabbadini (23 November 1850 – 7 February 1934) was an Italian classical philologist.

== Biography ==
Born in Sarego, Province of Vicenza to Giuseppe and Luigia Allegro, a peasant couple, Sabbadini began studying in Veneto before moving to Florence, where he graduated in Latin literature with a thesis on Virgil . Qualified as a lecturer in high schools, in 1886 he became a professor of Latin literature at the University of Catania, and then at the Accademia scientifico-letteraria di Milano from 1900 (which with the Gentile Reform, became part of the University of Milan). He was retired due to his age in 1926, when he was appointed professor emeritus.

He was a corresponding member of the Istituto Lombardo Accademia di Scienze e Lettere since 1905, corresponding member of the Accademia delle Scienze di Torino from 1911, correspondent member of the Accademia dei Lincei since 1910 and national member since 1920; and a member of the Accademia dell'Arcadia with the "pastoral name" of Filarco Eteo. He was elected a corresponding fellow of the British Academy in 1922.

Married in 1890 to Amalia Grifi, he had a daughter, Ada, wife of the politician and Latinist Concetto Marchesi.
