= Henri Leridon =

French demographer

Henri Leridon was born on 15 July 1942 in Algiers, where his father was an officer. He is a French demographer and director of research emeritus at the Institut national d'études démographiques (Ined).

== Biography ==
After studying at the Lycée Hoche (Versailles), he entered the École Polytechnique (X1962). He joined Ined as a project manager in 1965, obtained a diploma as a demographer from the Institute of Demography of the University of Paris (in 1966) and a diploma of higher education in economics (University of Caen, 1967). In 1972, he obtained a doctorate in economics (University of Paris 1).

He spent most of his career at Ined. In 1974–75, he was a visiting professor at the University of Pennsylvania (Philadelphia) and, from 2001 to 2006, he headed a unit of Epidemiology, Demography and Social Sciences (U569) at Inserm, a mixed unit with Ined and Paris XII University.

In 2008–2009, he was an associate professor at the Collège de France, chair of sustainable development.

In 1994, he was elected Correspondent of the French Academy of sciences (Institut de France) and, in 2014, Foreign Member of the British Academy.

Positions held

- Head of the Department of Socio-demography at Ined, from 1979 to 1992
- Head of Research Units at Ined from 1996 to 2001
- Chairman of Inserm Intercommission No. 5 on "Demographic trends and human health", from 1995 to 1999
- Chairman of the IUSSP Comparative Fertility Study Commission (1977-1981)
- Director of the GIS-ELFE "French Longitudinal Survey since childhood " (2006 -2010)
- Co-leader, with Heather Evelyn Joshi, University of London, of the European Science Foundation's EUCCONET network (2008-2013)

== Scientific work ==
Léridon's work focused first on contraceptive practices and family structures. On these two themes, the Ined surveys he conducted have long been the only reliable statistical sources on evolving practices. He has also devoted himself to the analysis of the fertility of human populations: his research is in line with that of the French demographer and historian Louis Henry, and has focused on the various components of fertility: fertility, intrauterine mortality, postpartum sterility and definitive sterility. He also worked on the recombination of these components in microsimulation models (Monte-Carlo method). This model has also made it possible to determine the real effectiveness of assisted human reproduction practices, both individually and collectively.

In 2002, he launched the idea of a large national cohort of children, aimed at monitoring a representative national sample of children from birth to adulthood, to study all aspects of their development in a multidisciplinary approach combining social sciences, health and environmental determinants. The Elfe cohort was formed in 2011, with 18,500 children born throughout metropolitan France, and is still followed by a team based at Ined and involving some 40 research teams.

== Publications ==
=== Books ===
- Leridon (H.), Human Fertility. The Basic Components, Univ. of Chicago Press, Chicago, 1977, 202 p.
- Charbit (Y .), Leridon (H.), Transition démographique et modernisation en Guadeloupe et Martinique, PUF, Cahier INED n°89, 1980, 308 p.
- Leridon (H.) et al., La seconde révolution contraceptive. La régulation des naissances en France de 1950 à 1985, PUF, Cahier INED n°117, 1987, 380 p. [reprinted 1999]
- Leridon (H.), Villeneuve-Gokalp (C.), Constance et inconstances de la famille. Biographies familiales des couples et des enfants, PUF, Cahier INED n° 134, 1994, 342 p. [reprinted 1999]
- Leridon (H.), Les enfants du désir. Julliard, 1995, 278 p. [réédité par Hachette-Littérature, Pluriel, 1998]
- Leridon (H.), Toulemon (L.), Démographie. Approche statistique et dynamique des populations. Economica, 1997, 440 p. [translated into Spanish]
- Leridon (H). De la croissance zéro au développement durable. Fayard/Collège de France, Leçons inaugurales du Collège de France, Paris, 2009, 64 p.

=== Management of books ===
- La Famille, (Rapport d'un Groupe de prospective pour le VIIè Plan). Paris, Hachette, 1975, p. 300
- Leridon (H.), Menken (J.), eds.: Natural Fertility / Fécondité Naturelle. Liège, UIESP et Ordina, 1979, p. 556
- Gray (R.), Leridon (H.), Spira (A.), eds.: Biological and Demographic Determinants of Human Reproduction. Oxford University Press, 1993, p. 482
- Bozon (M.) et Leridon (H.), eds : Sexualité et Sciences sociales. Les apports d'une enquête, Population special number, October 1993, 380 p. (Diff. PUF et INED) [English version: Sexuality and the social sciences, Dartmouth, 1996]
- Baulieu (E.), Héritier (F.) ad Leridon (H.), eds. : Contraception : contrainte ou liberté?, Paris, Ed. Odile Jacob, 1999, p. 306
- Leridon H. (coord.), Late parenthood : risks of failure to conceive, for pregnancy outcome and for the child. Rev Epidémiol Santé Publique 2005, vol.53 (HS-II), p. 128
- Sauvain-Dugerdil C., Leridon H., Mascie-Taylor N. (Eds), Human Clocks. The Bio-cultural Meanings of Age, Bern : Peter Lang, 2005, p. 350
- Leridon (H), Marsily (de) G. Démographie, climat et alimentation mondiale, Rapport sur la science et la technologie. Académie des Sciences/EDP-Sciences, vol. 32, p. 314 + 84, Paris, 2011.
- Leridon (H), (under the direction of) Les théories de la fécondité, Textes fondamentaux. Ined, Paris, 2014, p. 510

=== Articles in peer-reviewed journals (or books) ===
102 references, including :

- Leridon H., "Can ART compensate for the natural decline in fertility with age? A model assessment", Human Reproduction 19(7): 1548–1553, July 2004
- Leridon H. and Slama R. "The impact of a decline in fecundity and of pregnancy postponement on final number of children and demand for ART", Human Reproduction, 23(6) : 1312–19, 2008.
- Leridon H.," Effets biologiques du retard à la première maternité et du recours à l’aide médicale à la procréation sur la descendance finale", Population 2017(3), pp. 463–490. (English : "Biological Effects of First Birth Postponement and Assisted Reproductive Technology on Completed Fertility", Population-E, 72(3) : 445–472, 2017

=== Interviews and audio documents ===
- Henri Leridon. "La famille va-t-elle disparaître?" Séminaire Ined, autour de la parution du Dictionnaire de démographie et des sciences de la population, Armand Collin, 2011.
- https://youtu.be/Lr4srkDc1u Henri Leridon. "De la croissance zéro au développement durable". Leçon inaugurale au Collège de France, 2009
- Ghislain de Marsily et Henri Leridon. "Comment nourrir la planète en 2050?" Audio CD, De Vive Voix et Académie des sciences, 2010
- Leridon H. et Griffon M., "Présentation du rapport Académie des Sciences, Démographie, Climat et Alimentation mondiale", Canal Académie (recorded 13 May 2011).

== Honours and awards ==
- Prize of the French-speaking Statistician of the Statistical Societies of Paris and France (1989)
- Winner of the International Union for the Scientific Study of Population (2004)
- Officier in the Ordre National du Mérite
- Corresponding member of the French Academy of sciences (1992).
