= Paul Maas (classical scholar) =

German scholar (1880–1964)

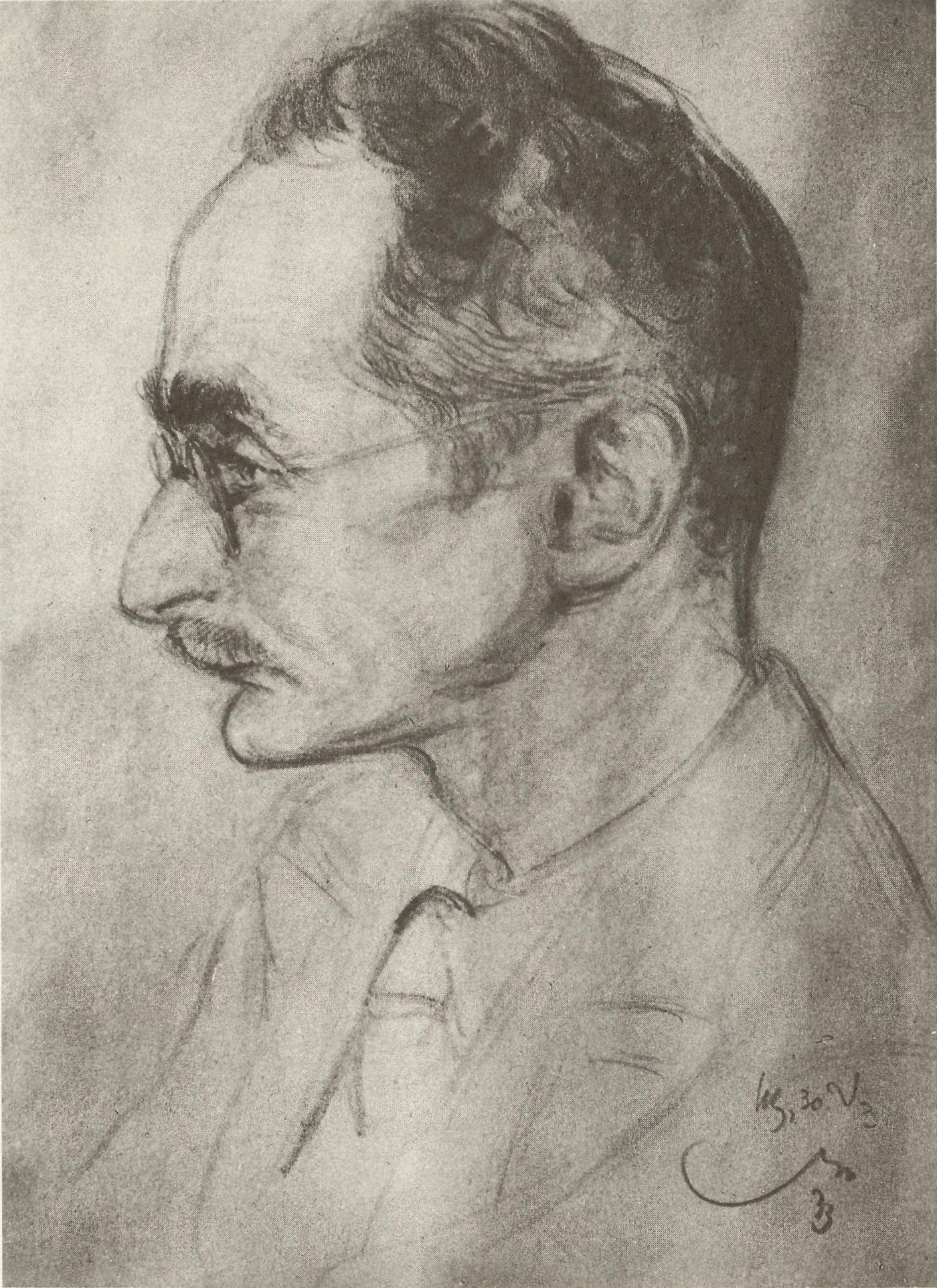
Paul Maas. Charcoal drawing by Emil Stumpp

Paul Maas (18 November 1880, in Frankfurt am Main – 15 July 1964, in Oxford) was a German classical scholar, paleographer and Byzantinist.

Among other things, he developed principles of textual criticism inherited from Karl Lachmann.

== Biography ==
He studied classical philology at the Friedrich Wilhelm University of Berlin and the Ludwig-Maximilians-Universität München, receiving his doctorate in 1903 under Ulrich von Wilamowitz. In 1910, he obtained his habilitation and in 1920 became professor at the Friedrich Wilhelm University of Berlin. In 1930, he was appointed chair of classical philology at the University of Königsberg. In 1934, he was forced into retirement by the Nazi government due to his Jewish ancestry. Maas’s close friends Enoch Powell and Bruno Snell helped secure him a visa to Great Britain after the University of Brussels refused to give him a job because they said he was a “extremist nationalist”, which was ready in January 1939. Maas left in August 1939 to England where he taught classes at the University of Oxford and collaborated with the Clarendon Press. During his first Oxford years, he lodged with jurist Fritz Schulz and his wife.

After his death, he was buried at Wolvercote Cemetery's Jewish section in Oxford.

== Research activity ==
His research interests lied mainly in textual criticism of Greek literature—poetry in particular—and on the theory of textual criticism. He also wrote on Greek paleography and on the transmission and the reception of the classics through the Middle Ages and the Byzantine millennium.

Unlike most of his colleagues, he produced a relatively small number of critical editions: of a collection of Byzantine liturgical poetry; of Apollonius Dyscolus's treatise "On pronouns"; and of Romanos the Melodist's poems, with Greek scholar C. A. Trypanis.

He wrote extensively on Nonnus of Panopolis, although most of his conjectures and observations he never published and only wrote on the margins of the editions by Arthur Ludwich and Rudolf Keydell he owned. He produced similar works on Apollonius of Rhodes, Athenaeus, and Herodotus. Classical scholar Willy Theiler once observed that Maas's printed contributions to classical philology must be multiplied by ten, because most of Maas's reflections and thoughts were not published by him and still are not.

His most famous work is the "Textkritik" (1927), a concise theoretical handbook of textual criticism. It has been translated into many languages. He also wrote a handbook of "Greek metre" (1923) and the handwritten notes for his unpublished "Byzantinische Metrik" have recently been discovered at Copenhagen.

His articles were collected by Wolfgang Buchwald in 1973.

== Maas's law ==
Maas formulated Maas's law, an observation of the layout of bookrolls.

== Works by Maas (selection) ==
=== Books ===
- Apollonius Dyscolus (1911). Maas, P. (ed.). De pronominibus — Pars generalis. Kleine Texte für Vorlesungen und Übungen, 82. Bonn: Marcus und Weber.
- Maas, P. (1923). Griechische Metrik. Leipzig – Berlin: B. G. Teubner.
- Maas, P. (1927). Textkritik. Leipzig – Berlin: B. G. Teubner.
  - Maas, P. (1950). Textkritik (II ed.). Leipzig – Berlin: B. G. Teubner.
  - Maas, P. (1957). Textkritik (III ed.). Leipzig – Berlin: B. G. Teubner.
  - Maas, P. (1960). Textkritik (IV ed.). Leipzig – Berlin: B. G. Teubner.
- Maas, P. (1927). "Griechische Paläographie". In Gercke, A.; Norden, E. (eds.). Einleitung in die Altertumswissenschaft. Vol. Iª. Leipzig – Berlin: B. G. Teubner. pp. 69–81.
  - Maas, P. (1980). "Griechische Paläographie". In Harlfinger, D. (ed.). Griechische Kodikologie und Textüberlieferung. Darmstadt: Wissenschaftliche Buchgesellschaft. pp. 37–59.
- Maas, P., ed. (1931). Frühbyzantinische Kirchenpoesie. Kleine Texte für Vorlesungen und Übungen, 52/53. Vol. I. Anonyme Hymnen des V—VI Jahrhunderts (II. ed.). Berlin: Walter de Gruyter.
- Maas, P., ed. (1933). Epidaurische Hymnen. Schriften der Königsberger Gelehrten Gesellschaft, 9. Jahr—Geisteswissenschaftliche Klasse, Heft 5. Halle: Max Niemer Verlag.
- Romanus Melodus (1963). Maas, P.; Trypanis, C. A. (eds.). Cantica genuina. Oxford: Clarendon Press.
- Romanus Melodus (1970). Maas, P.; Trypanis, C. A. (eds.). Cantica dubia. Berlin: Walter de Gruyter.
- Greek metre (1962), translation of Griechische Metrik, 1923.

== Bibliography ==
- Katja Bär: Paul Maas. In: Robert B. Todd (Hrsg.): Dictionary of British Classicists Vol. 2. Bristol 2004.
- Charles Oscar Brink: Paul Maas (1880–1964). In: Eikasmós 4, 1993, S. 253–254. (Abstract)
- Richard Kannicht: Griechische Metrik. In: Heinz-Günther Nesselrath (Hrsg.): Einleitung in die griechische Philologie. B. G. Teubner, Stuttgart/Leipzig 1997, ISBN 3-519-07435-4, S. 343–362.
- Lloyd-Jones, H. (1965). "Paul Maas†". Gnomon. 37 (2): 219–221. JSTOR 27683619.
- Lloyd-Jones, H. (1991). "Memories of Paul Maas". Greek in a Cold Climate. London: Duckworth. pp. 206–212.
- Lloyd-Jones, H. (1993). "Paul Maas (1880-1964)". Eikasmos. 4: 255–262.
- Eckart Mensching: Über einen verfolgten deutschen Altphilologen: Paul Maas 1880–1964. Berlin 1987.
- Peter Wirth (1987). "Maas, Paul". Neue Deutsche Biographie (in German). Vol. 15. Berlin: Duncker & Humblot. pp. 597–597. (full text online).
