= Éva Buchi =

Swiss linguist and lexicographer

Éva Buchi (Eva Büchi in German) is a Swiss linguist and lexicographer specializing in the Romance languages.

== Biography ==
After leaving school in 1983 she began training as a teacher, subsequently studying French linguistics at the University of Bern, where she obtained her doctorate in 1994. From 1987 to 1993 she worked as a research assistant and editor on the French etymological dictionary project FEW (Französisches Etymologisches Wörterbuch) in Basel. Her subsequent research continued to focus mainly on the lexicography and history of the Romance languages.

From 1993 to 1995, with the support of the Swiss National Science Foundation, Buchi continued to edit the FEW, now attached to the National Institute of the French Language (INaLF) in Nancy, France. Since 1995 she has been a researcher at the French National Centre for Scientific Research (CNRS) as part of INaLF, later ATILF (Analyse et traitement informatique de la langue française). There she primarily works on the Romance Etymological Dictionary (DÉRom). Since 2005 she has been Research Director at ATILF, and from 2013 to 2017 she was the head of the institute.

In addition, from 1999 to 2003 Buchi worked as a lecturer at Marc Bloch University, Strasbourg. In 2003 she obtained her habilitation at the Sorbonne in Paris, supervised by Jean-Pierre Chambon. Following this she lectured at Nancy 2 University, which later became part of the University of Lorraine.

In 2007 the Society of Romance Linguistics (SLiR) awarded her the Albert Dauzat Prize. In 2019 she was elected as a member of the Academia Europaea.

== Works ==
Éva Buchi has written numerous entries for the French Etymological Dictionary. What follows is a small selection of her other scholarly works.

- Buchi, Éva, & Wolfgang Schweickard. 2009. Romanistique et étymologie du fonds lexical héréditaire : du REW au DÉRom (Dictionnaire Étymologique Roman). (Romance philology and etymology of the inherited lexicon: from the REW to the DÉRom (Romance Etymological Dictionary).) In Carmen Alén Garabato, Teddy Arnavielle & Christian Camps (eds.), La Romanistique dans tous ses états, Paris: L’Harmattan: 97‐110.
- Buchi, Éva. 2010. Where Caesar's Latin does not belong: a comparative grammar based approach to Romance etymology. In Charles Brewer (ed.), Selected Proceedings of the Fifth International Conference on Historical Lexicography and Lexicology held at St Anne's College, Oxford, 16–18 June 2010, Oxford: Oxford University Research Archive.
- Buchi, Éva. 2016. Etymological dictionaries. In Philip Durkin (ed.), The Oxford handbook of lexicography, Oxford: Oxford University Press: 338-349.
