= Rudolf Keydell =

German classical philologist and librarian

Max Rudolf Keydell (30 March 1887 – 21 May 1982) was a German classical philologist and librarian.

Beginning in 1923, Keydell produced works about the 5th-century AD poet Nonnus, the author of the Dionysiaca, a 48-book epic poem. He continued working on this text through the rise of Nazism and the World War II, publishing eight articles on the topic between 1933 and 1955. Shortly before 1950, he fled from East Germany to West Berlin. Keydell's critical edition of the Dionysiaca was published in 1959, replacing that by Arthur Ludwich, published fifty years earlier. In 1967, he edited the Histories by Agathias for the Berlin series of the Corpus Fontium Historiae Byzantinae.

In 2015, Domenico Accorinti described Keydell and Francis Vian as the "greatest Nonnian scholars of the twentieth century", in Brill’s Companion to Nonnus of Panopolis, which was dedicated to the pair.

== Principal publications ==
- Keydell, R. (1911). Quaestiones metricae de epicis Graecis recentioribus. Berlin: Schade.
- Keydell, R. (1923). "Zu Nonnos". Byzantinisch-neugriechische Jahrbücher. 4: 14–17.
- Keydell, R. (1926–1927). "Zu Nonnos". Byzantinisch-neugriechische Jahrbücher. 5: 380–389.
- Keydell, R. (1927). "Zur Komposition der Bücher 13–40 der Dionysiaka des Nonnos". Hermes. 52 (4): 393–434. JSTOR 4474059.
- Keydell, R. (1928–1929). "Zu Nonnos". Byzantinisch-neugriechische Jahrbücher. 6: 19–24.
- Keydell, R. (1929). "Zu den Londoner Dionysiaca". Philologische Wochenschrift. 49: 1101.
- Keydell, R. (1931). "Die griechische Poesie der Kaiserzeit (bis 1929)". Jahresberichten über die Fortschritte der klassischen Altertumswissenschaft. 230: 41–161.
- Keydell, R. (1932a). "Eine Nonnos-Analyse". L'Antiquité Classique. 1: 173–202. doi:10.3406/antiq.1932.2943.
- Keydell, R. (1932b). "Zu den sogenannten Londoner Dionysiaka". Hermes. 67 (2): 240–241. JSTOR 4474262.
- Keydell, R. (1932c). "Zu Nonnos". Byzantinisch-neugriechische Jahrbücher. 9: 39–44.
- Keydell, R. (1933a). "Musaios [epischer Dichter]". Real-Encyklopädie der Classischen Altertumswissenschaft. Vol. XVI (31). pp. 767–769.
- Keydell, R. (1933b). "Über die Echtheit der Bibeldichtungen des Apollinaris und des Nonnos". Byzantinische Zeitschrift. 33 (2): 243–254. doi:10.1515/byzs.1933.33.2.243.
- Keydell, R. (1934a). "Ein jambischer Brief des Dioskoros von Aphrodito". Byzantinisch-neugriechische Jahrbücher. 10: 341–345.
- Keydell, R. (1934b). "Zum epidaurischen Panhymnus". Hermes. 69 (4): 459. JSTOR 4474391.
- Keydell, R. (1934c). "Zwei Stücke griechisch-ägyptischer Poesie". Hermes. 69 (4): 420–425. JSTOR 4474385.
- Keydell, R. (1935a). "Die Dichter mit Namen Peisandros". Hermes. 70 (3): 301–311. JSTOR 4474419.
- Keydell, R. (1935b). "Naumachios". Real-Encyklopädie der Classischen Altertumswissenschaft. Vol. XVI (32). pp. 1974–1975.
- Keydell, R., ed. (1959). Nonni Panopolitani Dionysiaca. Vol. I–II. Berlin: Weidmann.
- Keydell, R., ed. (1967). Agathiae Myrinaei Historiarum libri quinque. CFHB 2. Berlin – New York: Walter de Gruyter.
- Keydell, R. (1982). Peek, W. (ed.). Kleine Schriften zur hellenistischen und spätgriechischen Dichtung (1911–1976). Leipzig: Zentralantiquariat.
