= Französisches etymologisches Wörterbuch =

Etymological dictionary of Gallo-Romance languages

The Französisches etymologisches Wörterbuch (German for French Etymological Dictionary) or FEW is the principal etymological dictionary of the Gallo-Romance languages (such as French). It was the brainchild of the Swiss philologist Walther von Wartburg.

== History ==
The first edition of the FEW, written in German, was started in 1922, with the objective of tracing the origin, history and change of all words in the French lexicon, including Gallo-Romance languages: Occitan, Arpitan / Francoprovençal and Walloon. Since 1952, the Swiss National Science Foundation has supported this ambitious project, with the help of the French National Centre for Scientific Research (CNRS) since 1983. The first edition of the FEW was finished in 2002.

== Structure ==
The FEW comprises 25 volumes, 160 fascicles, and more than 17,000 pages.

- Volumes 1–14: Latin, Greek, and some pre-Roman onomatopoeic etymology.
- Volumes 15–17: Germanic etymology.
- Volume 18: anglicisms.
- Volume 19: Orientalia
- Volume 20: loanwords from other languages (Breton, Basque, Hebrew, and so on).
- Volumes 21–23: Material of unknown or uncertain origin, loanwords from other Romance languages, as well as corrections and new research.
- Volumes 24 and 25: New revisions of the letter "A".

There is a much-abridged version, the Dictionnaire étymologique de la langue française, published by the Presses universitaires de France.
