= Walther von Wartburg =

Swiss philologist and lexicographer (1888–1971)

Walther von Wartburg(-Boos) (18 May 1888, Riedholz – 15 August 1971, Basel) was a Swiss philologist and lexicographer. He was the editor-in-chief of the Französisches Etymologisches Wörterbuch (FEW).

== Biography ==
After studying at the universities of Berne, Zurich, Florence and Paris (The Sorbonne), in 1918 he presented his doctoral thesis Zur Benennung des Schafes in den romanischen Sprachen ("Names for sheep in Romance languages"). In 1921 he became Privatdozent at Berne. Following an appointment at the University of Lausanne, he taught at the University of Leipzig from 1929 to 1939. From 1940 to 1959, he was Professor of French Philology at the University of Basel.

His chief work is without a doubt the "Etymological French Dictionary" (whose original German title is Französisches Etymologisches Wörterbuch).

Von Wartburg had honorary doctorates from the University of Lausanne and the University of Leeds. In 1963 he received the German Order of Merit for Science and the Arts.

Today, a literary award, the Prix Wartburg de Littérature, is awarded each 25 April in recognition of a défenseur de la langue française, remarquable pour l'élégance de son écriture et/ou pour son anticonformisme. Il ne récompense pas nécessairement un ouvrage paru dans l'année précédente : il peut aussi marquer l'ensemble d'une œuvre ou un livre plus ancien: "Defender of the French language, remarkable for the elegance of his writing and/or for his non-conformity. It is not necessarily given for a work published in the previous year: it can also mark the completion of a work or a much older book".
