= Timpanaro =

Timpanaro is an Italian surname. Notable people with the surname include:

- Maximiliano Timpanaro (born 1988), Argentine footballer
- Sebastiano Timpanaro (1923–2000), Italian classical philologist, essayist, and literary critic
- Maria Timpanaro Cardini (1890–1978), classical philologist, mother of Sebastiano Timpanaro
