= Ernst Curtius =

German archaeologist and historian (1814–1896)

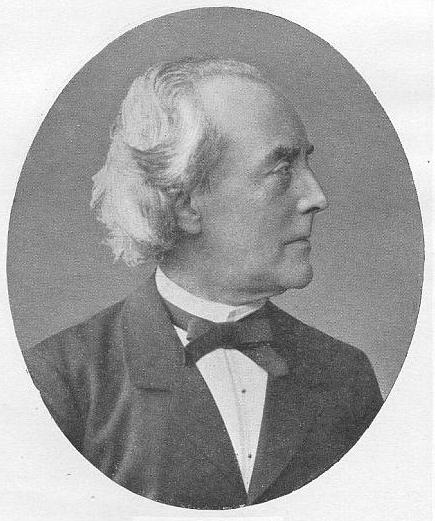
- Photograph from Imagines Philologorum by Alfred Gudeman
- Born: 2 September 1814; Lübeck
- Died: 11 July 1896 (aged 81); Berlin
- Known for: Olympia
- Scientific career
- Fields: archaeology

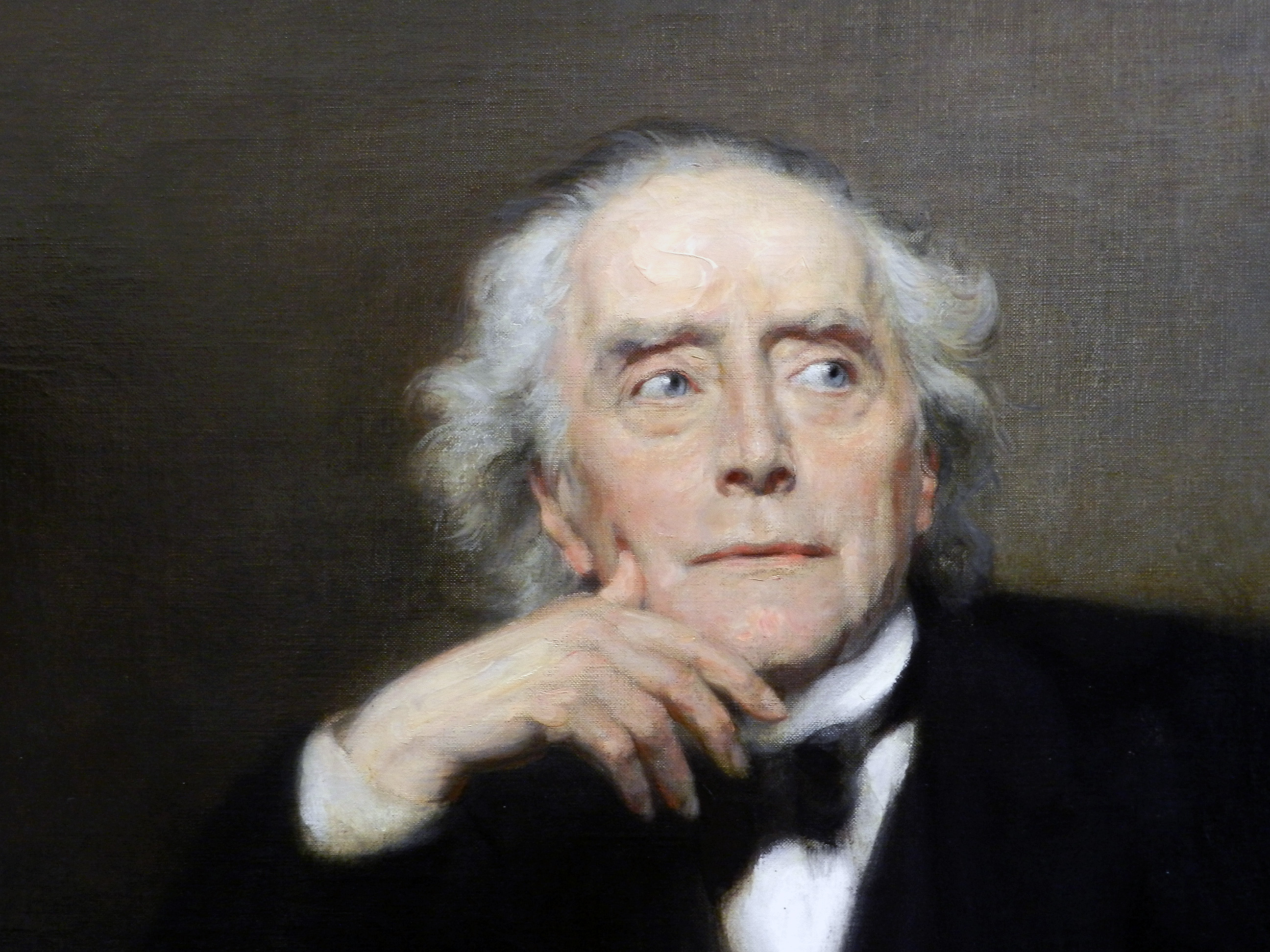
Portrait by Max Koner (detail, 1890)

Ernst Curtius (/ˈkʊərtsiˌʊs/; 2 September 1814 – 11 July 1896) was a German archaeologist, historian and museum director.

== Biography ==
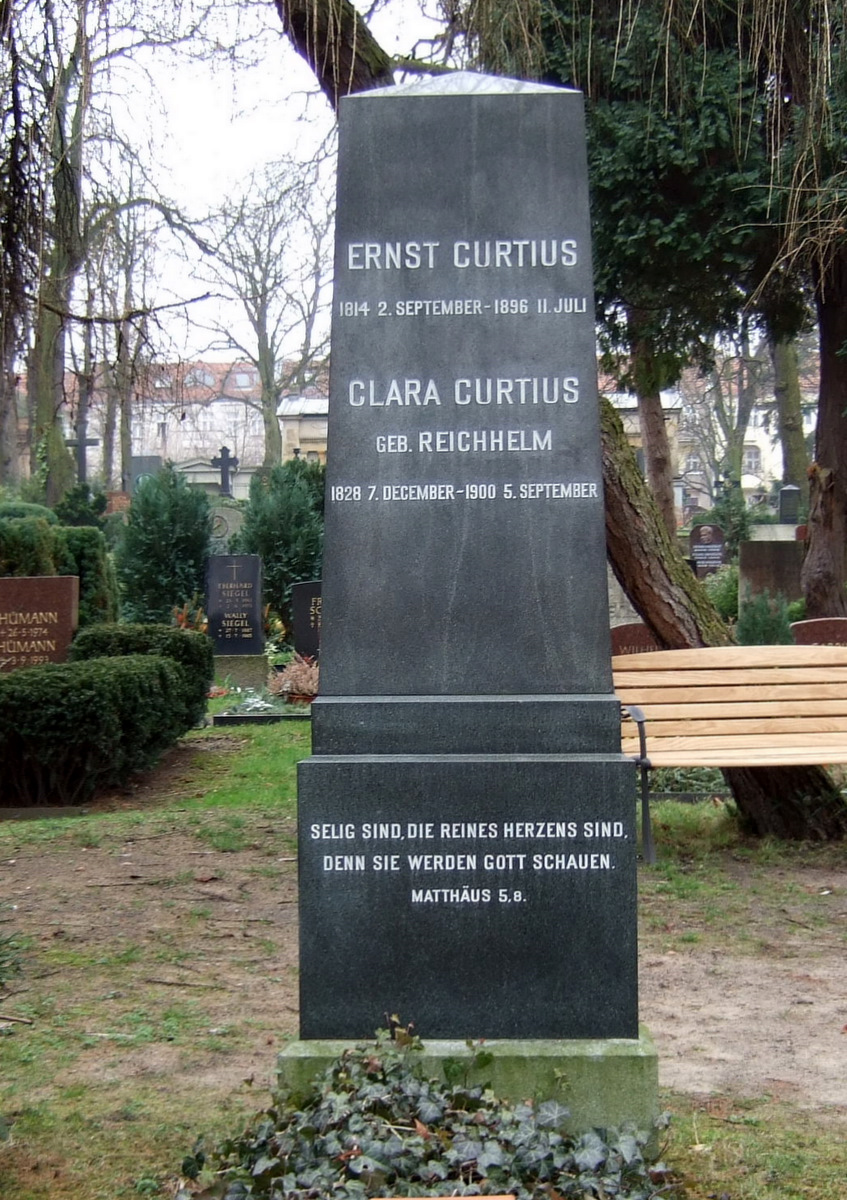
Curtius' tomb in Berlin

He was born in Lübeck. On completing his university studies he was chosen by C. A. Brandis to accompany him on a journey to Greece for the prosecution of archaeological researches. Curtius then became Karl Otfried Müller's companion in his exploration of the Peloponnese, and on Müller's death in 1840 he returned to Germany. In 1844, he became an extraordinary professor at the University of Berlin, and in the same year he was appointed tutor to Prince Frederick William (afterwards the Emperor Frederick III), a post which he held until 1850.

After holding a professorship at Göttingen and undertaking a further journey to Greece in 1862, Curtius was appointed (in 1863) ordinary professor at Berlin. In 1874, he was sent to Athens by the German government and there concluded an agreement by which the excavations at Olympia were entrusted exclusively to Germany. Curtius was elected an International Honorary Member of the American Academy of Arts and Sciences in 1876. In 1891 Curtius was elected a member of the American Antiquarian Society. He was elected an International Member of the American Philosophical Society in 1895. Curtius died in Berlin on 11 July 1896.

== Excavation in Olympia ==
On 10 June 1852 Ernst Curtius delivered his famous oration on Olympia at the Singakademie in Berlin in the presence of royal family, which marked the first step towards excavations of Olympia, and gave great impetus for the historical archaeological works in Greece. Following the death of Eduard Gerhard in 1867, Curtius succeeded him as professor of classical archaeology at Berlin. At the same time, Curtius served as a director of the Altes Museum and Antiquarium. The Turko-Russian War (1877–78) delayed the process of reaching an agreement between Greek and German governments for undertaking excavation at Olympia.

Curtius's imperial connections helped him to convince the government to nationalize the German Archaeological Institute in 1874, and open a branch in Athens. In 1874, the Greek government granted the exclusive right to the German Archaeological Institute to excavate at Olympia. A landmark agreement in the history of archaeology was signed by Curtius on 25 April 1874 at Athens, which mandated the Germans to leave all finds in Greece. A special museum was built on the site for this purpose.

In 1875 Curtius led large-scale expeditions of archeologists to systematically unearth Olympia. The first excavation was begun at Olympic in Elis, the original Olympic site, where for a thousand years, the Olympic Games had been held. Within six years, they cleared the Olympic stadium, with its runner's starting blocks and judges’ seat. The excavators also uncovered temple of Zeus’s and Hera.

The findings were published in scientific journals in voluminous throughout Europe between 1890 and 1897. Similarly, the German archaeologists were able to bring to life the knowledge of Olympic with paintings of the Olympic site, and the procedures of the Olympic Games. These helped the western world to understand the importance of reviving the Olympic Games.

== Works ==
His best-known work is his History of Greece (1857–1867). It presented in an attractive style what were then the latest results of scholarly research, but it was criticized as wanting in erudition. It is now superseded. His other writings are chiefly archaeological. The most important are:

- Die Akropolis von Athen (1844)
- Naxos (1846)
- Peloponnesos, eine historisch-geographische Beschreibung der Halbinsel (1851)
- Olympia (1852)
- Die Ionier vor der ionischen Wanderung (1855)
- Attische Studien (1862–1865)
- Ephesos (1874)
- Die Ausgrabungen zu Olympia (1877, etc.)
- Olympia und Umgegend (edited by Curtius and F. Adler, 1882)
- Olympia. Die Ergebnisse der von dem deutschen Reich veranstalteten Ausgrabung (with F. Adler, 1890–1898)
- Die Stadtgeschichte von Athen (1891)
- Gesammelte Abhandlungen (1894)

His collected speeches and lectures were published under the title of Altertum und Gegenwart (5th ed., 1903 foll.), to which a third volume was added under the title of Unter drei Kaisern (2nd ed., 1895).

== Family ==
His brother, Georg Curtius, was a noted philologist.
