= On Nature =

On Nature (Περὶ Φύσεως, Peri Physeos) is the name of several works of ancient philosophy:

- On Nature (Anaximander)
- On Nature (Empedocles)
- On Nature (Epicurus)
- On Nature (Heraclitus)
- On Nature (Melissus)
- On Nature (Parmenides)
- On Nature (Philolaus)
- On Nature (Zeno)

== See also ==
- Physis, a Greek philosophical, theological, and scientific term, usually translated into English as 'nature'
- Pseudo-Zeno
