= Eva Sachs =

German teacher and classical philologist

Eva Henriette Sachs (13 April 1882 – September 1936) was a German classical philologist, whose dissertation reconceptualized the relation between Theaetetus and Plato.

== Life and career ==
Eva Sachs was born in Berlin on 13 April 1882. Daughter of the Jewish couple Immanuel Sachs and Minna Sachs (Lachmann), she was early orphaned.

Between 1898 and 1902 she attended the Victoria-Lyzeum. Then, in 1904, she enrolled at the Friedrich-Wilhelms-Universität, Berlin, studying Plato. She had classes with great classicists such as Ernst Cassirer, Otto Hirschfeld, Eduard Meyer and Friedrich Paulsen. However, her great mentor was Ulrich von Wilamowitz-Moellendorff, who between 1904 and 1914 offered several lectures and seminars on Plato and inspired her to produce her dissertation under his supervision, with Hermann Diels as second reader.

In her dissertation, De Theaeteto Atheniensi Mathematico, promoted in 1914, she re-conceptualized the relation between Theaetetus, the mathematician, and Plato.

Sachs proved with her dissertation that Theaetetus, son of Euphronius from Sounion, was, at the same time, the mathematician and the friend and student of Plato. In this way, the Suda is responsible to causing the confusion of transforming the same Theaetetus into two. She also persuasively argued that the battle of Corinth (Pl. Tht. 142a) in which Theaetetus died was the one on 369 B.C., and not 394 B.C.

Due to the good acceptance of her dissertation conclusions by the highest authorities in the subject, an expanded German version of this work, The Five Platonic Solids: On the History of Mathematics and the Theory of Elements in Plato and the Pythagoreans, was translated from the Latin and published in 1917.

Despite the good reception of her work, Sachs did not continue her career. Notwithstanding her contribution to Wilamowitz's considerations on his famous study on Plato, published in 1919, she is generally viewed as a source of evidence for Wilamowitz, instead of a scholar in her own right.

Eva Sachs spent her last years in an asylum and died in Vienna in September 1936.
