= Karl Bürger =

German classical scholar (1866–1936)

Karl Ernst Bürger (11 April 1866 – 3 September 1936) was a German classical scholar of the late 19th century, who made significant contributions to the critical study of the Ancient Greek and Roman Novel, thereby helping to establish the field as a major area of study within Classical Philology.

== Biography ==
Bürger was born at Seitsch in the former Prussian province of Silesia (German: Schlesien; since 1945 a part of Poland), near the border of Posen. His Protestant father Oscar Bürger was an economic inspector and his mother Maria of the Willenberg family. From 1878 to 1883 he attended Grammar school in Glogau. At the age of 17 he moved to Berlin to be enrolled at the University of Berlin, then a stronghold of source-critical historicism and philology, where he studied classical philology and ancient history from 1883 to 1887. Among his notable professors in philology were Ernst Maass and Hermann Diels, and in history Elimar Klebs, Hans Droysen, and Ulrich Köhler. After receiving his Dr. phil. degree, Bürger made a career as a teacher in the grammar schools of Berlin, until 1892, when he was called to serve as the private teacher of Prince Friedrich Wilhelm of Prussia, the youngest son of Prince Albert of Prussia, regent of The Duchy of Brunswick. In the spring of 1896 he took up a teaching position at the Gymnasium of Blankenburg, where he was to spend most of his career as 'Oberlehrer' (head-teacher). He retired in the spring of 1927, and died in Blankenburg 1936 after suffering a stroke.

Bürger's major scholarly achievement was to disprove the hypothesis that there was a radical difference between the Greek and the Roman novels of antiquity, a difference that corresponded to the different national characters of the Greeks and the Romans. This hypothesis was much favored at the time in the writings of leading philologists such as Mommsen and Rohde. Bürger achieved this by demonstrating the close literary-historical and structural affinity of the two extant Roman novels of Apuleius and Petronius to a certain fragmentary but well-attested Ancient Greek work of prose fiction, the Milesian Tales of Aristides of Miletus (2nd century BCE). This established that the specific type of ancient novel, commonly associated with the Romans, was originally just as Greek as the Ancient Greek Romance. In his Dr. phil. dissertation from 1887 on the vexed subject of the Greek background of Apuleius' Metamorphoses, better known as The Golden Ass, Bürger demonstrated for the first time that Apuleius adapted his Roman novel – with some fanciful interpolations of his own – from a Greek original of the same title, preserved in abridged form in the Ancient Greek tale Loukios or the Ass that is found among the works of Lucian.

Bürger never advanced to the rank of professor at a German university and his scholarly works were relatively limited in number compared to many of the great philologists of his time, but the few studies that he published have proven to be of enduring value for the study of the Ancient Novel.

== Works ==
- 1887 Dr.phil. dissertation, De Lucio Patrensi sive de ratione inter Asinum q. f. Lucianeum Apuleique Metamorphoses intercedente. Available online at archive.org, written in Latin.
- 1888 "Zu Apuleius", Hermes 23, pp. 489–498.
- 1892 "Zu Xenophon von Ephesus", Hermes 27, pp. 36–67.
- 1892 "Der antike Roman vor Petronius", Hermes 27, pp. 345–458.
- 1902 Studien zur geschichte des griechischen romans, Vol. 1 (Der Lukiosroman und seine litteraturgeschichtliche Bedautung) Available online at archive.org
- 1903 Studien zur geschichte des griechischen romans, Vol. 2 (Die litteraturgeschiclitliche Stellung des Antonius Diogenes und der historia Apollonii. Available online at archive.org
- Bürger also published articles and Reviews in Globus and Berliner Philologischen Wochenschrift.

== Bibliography ==
- Bürger, Karl (1887) De Lucio Patrensi sive de ratione inter Asinum q. f. Lucianeum Apuleique Metamorphoses intercedente. Vita at the end. Available online at archive.org
- Bürger, Karl (1892) "Der antike Roman vor Petronius", Hermes 27, pp. 345–458
- Jahresbericht über das Herzogliche Gymnasium zu Blankenburg am Harz. Ostern 1896 bis Ostern 1897 (Blankenburg am Harz: Verlag von Otto Kircher, 1897), p. 8. <http://digital.ub.uni-duesseldorf.de/ulbdsp/periodical/pageview/3379328>
- Jensson, Gottskálk (2004) The Recollections of Encolpius. The Satyrica of Petronius as Milesian Fiction (Groningen), pp. 245–301.
- Perry, Ben Edwin (1926) "An Interpretation of Apuleius' Metamorphoses", TPAPhA 57, 7, pp. 238–260; p. 238, with n. 2.
- Witte, Ernst Das Gymnasium zu Blankenburg am Harz. Von seinen Anfängen bis zum Ausbruch des Weltkrieges. Festschrift zur Erinnerungsfeier des Gymnasiums am 24. und 25. September 1927, Blankenburg am Harz: Verlag von Otto Kircher 1927, p. 155.
