= Paul Kretschmer =

German linguist (1866–1956)

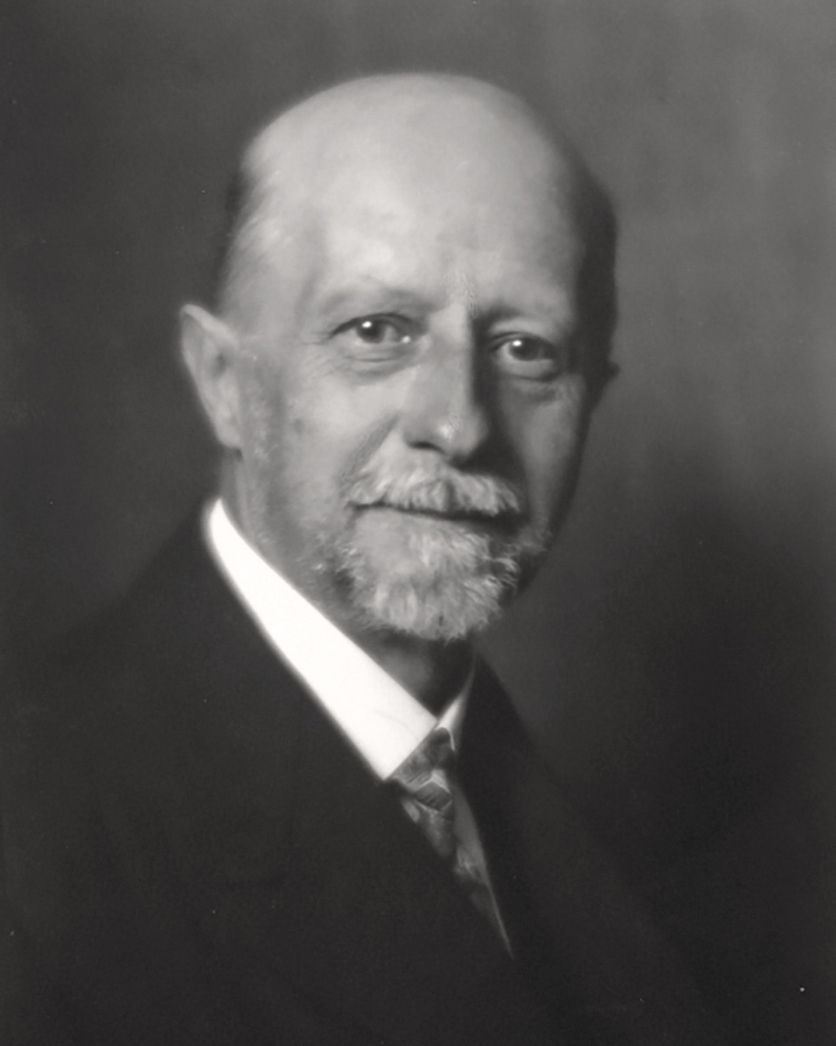
- Born: 2 May 1866; Berlin, Prussia
- Died: 9 March 1956 (aged 89); Vienna, Austria

Academic work
- Discipline: Indo-European linguistics

Paul Kretschmer (2 May 1866 – 9 March 1956) was a German linguist who studied the earliest history and interrelations of the Indo-European languages and showed how they were influenced by non-Indo-European languages, such as Etruscan.

== Biography ==
Kretschmer was born in Berlin, where he studied classic and Indo-European philology under Hermann Diels.

His epochal study of pre-Greek elements in ancient Greek was his 1896 Einleitung in die Geschichte der griechischen Sprache (Introduction to the History of the Greek Language). Comparing Greek place names with their foreign counterparts in ancient Anatolia, he concluded that a non-Greek, Mediterranean culture had preceded the Greeks there, leaving extensive linguistic traces. The discoveries of the archaeologist Sir Arthur Evans at Knossos, Crete, around 1900 tended to confirm Kretschmer's views.

Following a professorship at the University of Marburg in Germany (1897–99), Kretschmer occupied the chair in comparative linguistics at the University of Vienna, where he remained until 1936. An adherent of the Neogrammarian school of linguistics, which stressed rigorous comparative methodology, he also contributed to Modern Greek dialectology and furthered the study of German linguistic geography.

He died in Vienna in 1956.
