= Walther Kranz =

German classicist and educationist (1884–1960)

Walther Kranz (German: [kʁants]; 23 November 1884, Georgsmarienhütte – 18 September 1960, Bonn) was a German classical philologist and historian of philosophy.

== Biography ==
Kranz studied classical philology at the University of Berlin from 1903 to 1907 with Ulrich von Wilamowitz-Moellendorf, Hermann Diels and Eduard Norden. He received his doctorate in 1910 with Wilamowitz-Moellendorf. For several years he was a teacher at the Berlin-Grunewald experimental school. In 1932, he joined the University of Halle as an honorary professor of classical languages. He took over the publication of Die Fragmente der Vorsokratiker (The Fragments of the Pre-Socratics) from the 5th edition onwards. After the takeover by the Nazis, he experienced political difficulties because his wife was Jewish. In 1937 he lost his full teaching license, and in 1943 he accepted an invitation from the University of Istanbul and taught there until 1950. From 1950 to 1955 he served as an honorary professor of ancient history at the University of Bonn. He died in Bonn in 1960.

== Works ==
- Stasimon. Untersuchungen zu Form und Gehalt der griechischen Tragödie, Verlag Weidman, Berlin 1933.
- Geschichte der griechischen Literatur. Leipzig 1940; 1998. ISBN 3-88059-949-1
- Die griechische Philosophie: Zugleich eine Einführung in die Philosophie überhaupt. Leipzig 1941; 2004 ISBN 3-938484-85-3
- Studien zur antiken Literatur und ihrem Fortwirken. Heidelberg 1967.
