= Alfred Gudeman =

American-German classicist (1862–1942)

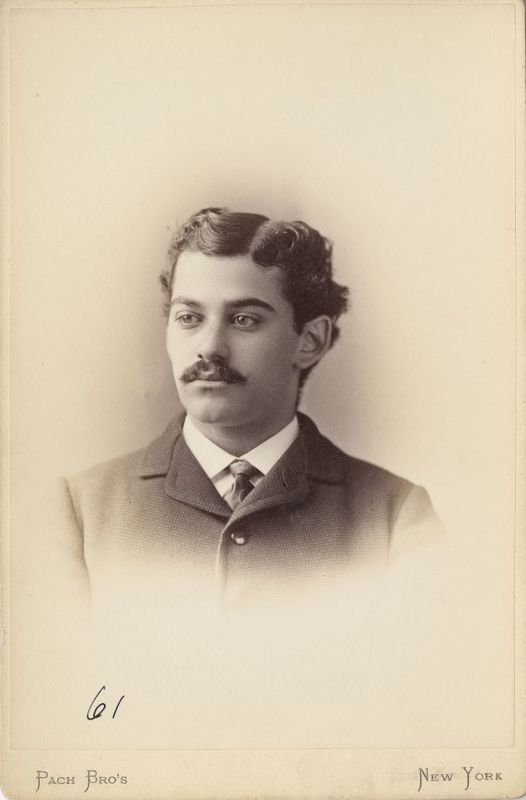
Alfred Gudeman as student at Columbia University (1883)

Alfred Gudeman (August 26, 1862 – 9 September 1942) was an American-German classical scholar.

== Biography ==
He was born in Atlanta, Georgia and graduated from Columbia University in 1883 and studied under Johannes Vahlen and Hermann Diels at the University of Berlin. From 1890 to 1893 he was reader in classical philology at Johns Hopkins University, from 1893 to 1902 professor in the University of Pennsylvania, and from 1902 to 1904 professor in Cornell University.

He wrote Latin Literature of the Empire (2 vols., Prose and Poetry, 1898–1899), a History of Classical Philology (1902) and Sources of Plutarchs Life of Cicero (1902); and edited Tacitus' Dialogus de oratoribus (text with commentary, 1894 and 1898) and Agricola (1899; with Germania, 1900), and Sallust's Catiline (1903). In 1904 he became a member of the corps of scholars preparing the Thesaurus Linguae Latinae, a unique distinction for an American Latinist, as was the publication of his critical edition, with German commentary, of Tacitus' Agricola in 1902 by the Weidmannsche Buchhandlung of Berlin.

Gudeman married a German woman and, in 1917, received German nationality. Even after the seizure of power by the National Socialists, Gudeman remained in Germany. His son Theodore emigrated to Indiana in 1937, but Gudeman himself remained. He was classified as a Jew and deported to the Nazi Theresienstadt concentration camp, where he died in 1942.

== Sources ==
- Donna Hurley, "Alfred Gudeman, Atlanta, Georgia, 1862-Theresienstadt, 1942", TAPA 120 (1990) pp. 355–381
