= Hermann Alexander Diels =

German classical scholar (1848–1922)

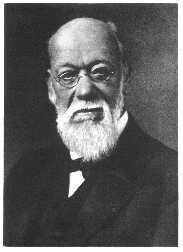
- Born: 18 May 1848; Biebrich, Duchy of Nassau
- Died: 4 June 1922 (aged 74); Dahlem, Berlin, Weimar Germany
- Education: University of Bonn
- Known for: Diels–Kranz numbering
- Children: Ludwig Diels, Otto Diels, Paul Diels
- Scientific career
- Fields: Classics
- Workplaces: University of Berlin
- Thesis: De Galeni historia philosophia (1870)
- Doctoral advisor: Hermann Usener
- Doctoral students: Felix Jacoby
- Other notable students: Margarete Bieber; Karl Bürger; Maria Timpanaro Cardini; Alfred Gercke; Alfred Gudeman; Otto Kern; Paul Kretschmer; Walther Kranz; Eva Sachs

Hermann Alexander Diels (German: [diːls]; 18 May 1848 – 4 June 1922) was a German classical scholar, who was influential in the area of early Greek philosophy and is known for his standard work Die Fragmente der Vorsokratiker. Diels helped to import the term Presocratic into classical scholarship and developed the Diels–Kranz numbering system for ancient Greek Presocratic texts.

== Biography ==
Hermann Alexander Diels was born to Ludwig A Diels, a railroad stationmaster, and Anna D. Diels in Biebrich on May 18, 1848, and attended a Gymnasium in Wiesbaden (1858-67) before pursuing studies in higher education.

He was educated at the universities of Bonn and Berlin but did not have enough money to complete a habilitation. As a result, Diels became a teacher at a Gymnasium in Flensburg, the Gelehrtenschule des Johanneums in Hamburg and the Konigstadtische Realschule in Berlin. In 1882, Diels joined the faculty of the Humboldt University of Berlin and in 1886 became professor ordinarius of classical philology at the same institution. During this time, Diels was a close colleague of Eduard Zeller.

Diels became a member of the Berlin Academy in 1881, the British Academy in 1907, a foreign honorary member of the American Academy of Arts and Sciences in 1907, and a member of the American Philosophical Society in 1909. He was the co-founder of Archiv für Geschichte der Philosophie in 1888 and edited Commentaria in Aristotelem Graeca at the Prussian Academy of Sciences from 1877 to 1909.

== Die Fragmente der Vorsokratiker ==
He is now known for a collection of quotations from and reports about Presocratic philosophers. (Note: The popularity of the term "Presocratic" (Vorsokratiker in German) is due originally to Diels, though the term had been in use as early as George Grote's Plato and the Other Companions of Sokrates (1865).) This work, entitled Die Fragmente der Vorsokratiker (The Fragments of the Pre-Socratics), is still widely used by scholars. It was first published in 1903, was later revised and expanded three times by Diels, and was subsequently revised in a fifth edition (1934–7) by Walther Kranz and again in a sixth edition (1952). It consists of three volumes that present, for each of the Presocratics, both quotations from their (now mostly lost) works transmitted by later writers, and secondary-source material known as testimonia. (Note: Testimonia are: commentary on the works of the Presocratics, accounts of their lives and of their philosophical views. The collection includes a German translation of the Presocratic quotations, but not of the testimonia.)

Based on Diels' enumeration of the fragments, the testimonia in the Diels collection are known as the "A-fragments", while the quotations from the Presocratics are known as the "B-fragments". Diels's method of labeling the fragments has become the standard way of referring to the works of the Presocratics.

For example, what is thought to be the introductory section of Parmenides' poem on the "Ways of Truth and Opinion" was quoted by Sextus Empiricus and Simplicius; in Diels–Kranz this is labeled as fragment 28B1 — i.e., chapter 28, section B, fragment 1. The "28" stands for Parmenides (to whom Diels–Kranz devote chapter 28 in the numeration of the current edition), the "B" indicates that it is a quotation, and the "1" means that it is the first quotation in Diels' ordering of quotations of Parmenides. On the other hand, the beginning of Plato's account (in his Parmenides 127ff.) of an alleged visit of Parmenides and Zeno to Athens is labeled by Diels as fragment 29A11. "29" stands for Zeno (the next Presocratic after Parmenides in Diels' collection), since this particular passage in Plato has more directly to do with Zeno than Parmenides; the "A" indicates that it is a "testimonium", a story about the philosopher(s) in question, not a quotation; and the "11" means that it is the 11th testimonium about Zeno in Diels. The ordering of Presocratics in Diels is roughly chronological (from Orpheus to the author of the dissoi logoi); the numbering of the fragments themselves, within each chapter, is determined generally by the alphabetic order of the names of the sources. The usual way of citing fragments in Diels' edition is to append "Diels–Kranz" or the letters "DK" to the fragment-number; so, for example "28B1 Diels–Kranz" or "28B1 DK" (discussed above).

Often, a commentator will refer to a fragment in Diels–Kranz in a more abbreviated form. For example, one may refer to 28B1 as simply "Parmenides, fragment 1".

In spite of the respect paid to Diels' monumental work, there is ongoing controversy among scholars over the details of his arrangement of the fragments. For example, some fragments categorized by Diels as quotations are thought by some scholars to be in reality, only paraphrases or explanations of the Presocratic work in question. Also, Diels–Kranz does not of course, include fragments discovered since its publication, such as fragments from the Strasbourg papyrus (published in 1998), which preserves for us pieces of Empedocles' poetry never before known in modern times. (What we have in the Strasbourg Papyrus seems to be a continuation of the part of Empedocles' On Nature which is 31B17 DK.)

An English translation or paraphrase of each of the B-fragments in Diels–Kranz may be found in Kathleen Freeman's Ancilla to the Pre-Socratic Philosophers (Oxford, 1948; Harvard U. Press, 1957), though it is based on the fifth edition of Diels–Kranz, whose numbering of fragments is somewhat different from later editions.

== Major works ==
- Doxographi Graeci (Berlin, 1879, reprint Berlin: de Gruyter, 1929)
- Simplicii In Aristotelis Physicorum libros quattuor priores commentaria (2 vol. Berlin, 1882–1895, reprint Berlin: de Gruyter, 1962)
- Parmenides Lehrgedicht (Berlin, 1897, second edition with a new Preface by Walter Burkert, Sankt Augustin, Academia Verlag 2003)
- Poetarum Philosophorum Fragmenta (Berlin, 1901, reprint Hildesheim: Weidmann 2000).
- Die Fragmente der Vorsokratiker (Berlin, 1903, 6th ed., rev. by Walther Kranz (Berlin: Weidmann, 1952; the editions after the 6th are mainly reprints with little or no change.)
- Kleine Schriften zur Geschichte der antiken Philosophie edited by Walter Burkert, Hildesheim: Georf Olms 1969
