= Maria Timpanaro Cardini =

20th-century Italian classical philologist

Maria Timpanaro Cardini (born Maria Cardini; 1890–1978) was an Italian philologist who studied the history of ancient philosophy and history of science.

== Biography ==
Cardini was born on August 24, 1890, in Arezzo. She received her degree in Greek philology in Naples in 1914. She traveled briefly to Berlin to study with Ulrich von Wilamowitz-Moellendorff and Hermann Diels. Cardini was active for several years as a dadaist poet. She was friends with, among others, Tristan Tzara, but abandoned poetic practice in 1920.

Cardini worked as a high school teacher, first in Parma, where she met her future husband Sebastiano Timpanaro Sr., then in a private Florentine school, and finally in Pisa. Cardini and Timpanaro married in 1922 in Naples. After the Second World War, she was active in local politics with the Partito Socialista Italiano, where she dealt mostly with the secular maternal schools of Pisa.

Cardini earned national and international recognition as an editor and translator of Sophist and Pythagorean fragments, Pseudo-Aristotelian texts, and the works of Proclus, as well as for her publications on the history of ancient science. She later completed the first Italian translation of Sidereus nuncius by Galileo Galilei.

She died in 1978 in Florence.

Her literary archive is managed by the library of the Scuola Normale Superiore in Pisa. Her son, Sebastiano Timpanaro, also became a classical philologist.

== Selected works ==
- I Sofisti. Frammenti e testimonianze. Translation, preface, and notes., Bari, Laterza, 1923.
- Galileo Galilei, Sidereus nuncius, Translation with foreword, preface, and notes, Firenze, Sansoni, 1948.
- Pitagorici. Testimonianze e frammenti, 3 voll., Firenze, La Nuova Italia, 1958–64.
- Il «Cielo» di Aristotele, in: "Physis. Rivista Internazionale di Storia della Scienza", VI (1964).
- Pseudo-Aristotele, De lineis insecabilibus, Introduction, translation, and commentary, Milano-Varese, Istituto editoriale cisalpino, 1970 ("Testi e documenti per lo studio dell'antichità", 32).
- Proclo, Commento al I libro degli "Elementi" di Euclide, Introduction, translation, and notes, Pisa, Giardini, 1978.
- Tra antichità classica e impegno civile, edited by Sebastiano Timpanaro, Pisa, ETS, 2001.
- Pitagorici Antichi. Testimonianze e frammenti, Milano, Bompiani, 2010.

== Sources ==
- Graziano Arrighetti, Sebastiano Timpanaro: ritratto della madre, in: Omaggio a Sebastiano Timpanaro, edited by Walter Lapini, La Spezia, Agorà, 2013 ("Sileno. Rivista di studi classici e cristiani", XXXIX), pp. 3–12.
- Giovanna Derenzini, Maria Timpanaro Cardini, in: "Physis. Rivista Internazionale di Storia della Scienza", XXII (1980), pp. 133–145.
- Timpanaro, Sebastiano (2001). "Nascita di Maria Timpanaro Cardini". Belfagor (in Italian). 56 (2): 198–202. ISSN 0005-8351.
