= Friedrich Klingner =

German classical philologist (1894–1968)

- Born: 7 July 1894; Dresden, Saxony, Germany
- Died: 26 January 1968 (aged 73); Munich, Bavaria, West Germany
- Education: University of Tübingen; Friedrich Wilhelm University of Berlin; Marburg University
- Occupation: Classical Philologist
- Spouse: Hedwig Angere
- Children: none
- Parent(s): Albrecht Klingner (1865–1939); Martha Pönitz (1865–1941)

Friedrich Klingner (7 July 1894 – 26 January 1968) was a German classical philologist. He worked at increasingly senior levels as a university professor, successively at the University of Hamburg (1925–1930), Leipzig University (1930–1947) and the Ludwig-Maximilians-Universität München (1947–1963). Viewed by admirers as one of the leading Latinists of his generation, he advanced the study of Latin literature, producing important studies of Sallust, Virgil, Horace and Tibullus which continue to engage scholars.

== Biography ==
Friedrich Klingner was born into a Protestant family in Dresden, where he also attended school. Albrecht Klingner (1865–1939), his father, worked as a teacher. His paternal grandfather had been a master shoemaker. Friedrich Klingner's mother, born Martha Pönitz (1865–1941), was also the child of a teacher.

He began his university studies in Classical Philology at the University of Tübingen in 1914 but was obliged to abandon this course after one term because of the outbreak of the First World War. He was involved in the fighting, but was able to resume his studies at the Friedrich Wilhelm University of Berlin where his teachers included Ulrich von Wilamowitz-Moellendorff, Eduard Norden and Paul Friedländer. He was influenced, in particular, by Friedländer. When Friedländer took a promotion which involved a switch to Marburg University, Klingner followed him there. It was at Marburg that in the space of just three years he passed his state teaching exams and received both his doctorate (1921) and habilitation (1923). His doctoral dissertation was published in the Philologische Untersuchungen series: it concerned The Consolation of Philosophy by Boethius. In 1923, he returned to Berlin where he took appointments as a research assistant and librarian. He became part of the circle around Werner Jaeger, and came to know, among others, Otto Regenbogen, who became a friend.

After only two years in Berlin, and still aged only 31, Klingner accepted a full professorship at the newly established University of Hamburg. The teaching chair in classical philology had fallen vacant with the early death of the first incumbent, Otto Plasberg. Klingner remained at Hamburg till 1930. In 1930, he moved to Leipzig University, where he succeeded Richard Heinze (who had died) and whose seat as a member of the Saxon Academy of Sciences and Humanities he also took over. He taught at Leipzig until 1947, which means he was there throughout the twelve Hitler years. The new government took power in January 1933 and rapidly transformed the country into a one-party dictatorship. In November 1933, Friedrich Klingner was one of approximately 900 university professors who were persuaded to sign the "Declaration of the German Professors in support of Adolf Hitler" ("Bekenntnis der deutschen Professoren zu Adolf Hitler"). The full horrors of National Socialist government had yet to unfold, but as they did, and more particularly after 1945, those who had signed the declaration suffered varying levels of reputational damage. Leipzig was liberated in 1944 by US forces, but US occupation of the region was not envisaged in the agreements that the allied governments had already established, and in July 1944 the Americans withdrew and the Soviets moved in. The entire central third of Germany was to be administered as the Soviet occupation zone (relaunched in October 1949 as the Soviet-sponsored Germany Democratic Republic (East Germany). Leipzig University would become the leading university in the new country. In 1947, however, with the drift of future political developments becoming increasingly clear, Friedrich Klingner received and accepted an invitation to move again, this time to the Ludwig-Maximilians-Universität München (in the American occupation zone). His transfer to the Ludwig-Maximilians-Universität München had indeed been expected to take place ten years earlier, but at that time it had been blocked for political reasons. He continued to undertake teaching and research at the Ludwig-Maximilians-Universität München until his retirement in 1962 or 1963, after which his involvement with the university continued. As an emeritus professor, he also continued to publish his research.

Friedrich Klingner served as rector of the Ludwig-Maximilians-Universität München during the 1957/58 academic year. He was a full member of the "Philosophical Historical Class" at the Saxon Academy of Sciences and Humanities between 1935 and 1947, and retained his connection as a corresponding member between 1947 and 1968 despite the political and physical division of Germany which became increasingly stark between 1945 and 1961. He was a corresponding member of the Vienna-based Austrian Academy of Sciences and Humanities between 1956 and 1968. He belonged to the Swedish Academy between 1957 and 1968 and, closer to home, was a full member of the Bavarian Academy of Sciences and Humanities between 1947 and 1968.

== Works ==
Friedrich Klingner was one of the leading latinists of his generation, and must, with Eduard Fraenkel, share much of the credit for the growing attention paid to Latinistics during the twentieth century. His researches covered classical and post-classical Latin literature. He did not hesitate to draw on earlier Greek and Latin texts where a piece of work required it. He was "making waves" even with his habilitation dissertation on Boethius in which he highlighted numerous problems with the then widely respected opening thesis of Hermann Usener that the Boethius work was in large part derivative from the Protreptikos of Aristotle. Klingner separated out and spelled out the distinctive influences of cynic, stoic, neoplatonic and christian views of the world.

Of particular importance were Klingner's researches on the Roman historians, epic poets and lyric poets. He demonstrated that Sallust had his own historical perspective and was not simply some latter-day version of Posidonius. Along with Hans Drexler (though the two were working independently of one another) he refuted the thesis that the historical writings of Sallust were simply partisan presentations on behalf of one particular political party. In 1930, he turned his focus to the life-time output of Virgil, identifying a structural unity in a body of work that was many decades in the making. Klingner published works by the lyric poet Horace after painstaking analysis of the manuscripts, contributing insights and clarifications in a new critical edition which, half a century after his death, continues to command wide respect. He also contributed important work on Greek literature. In respect of the Iliad and the Odyssey he determined through stylistic analyses that only the "Dolonie" and "Telemachy" could be seen as later insertions.

== Output (selection) ==
- Q. Horatius Flaccus: Opera, Leipzig 1939. Dritte Auflage, Leipzig 1959 (Nachdruck 1970, 1982, 2008)
- Römische Geisteswelt: Essays über Schrifttum und geistiges Leben im alten Rom, Leipzig 1943. Fünfte vermehrte Auflage, München 1965 (Nachdruck 1972, 1979)
- Studien zur griechischen und römischen Literatur, Zürich/Stuttgart 1964 (mit Bild und Schriftenverzeichnis)
- Virgil: Bucolica, Georgica, Aeneis, Zürich/Stuttgart 1967
