= Regenbogen =

Regenbogen (German for "rainbow") may refer to:

== People ==
- Otto Regenbogen (1891–1966) German linguist and scholar

== Music ==
- Regenbogen, album by Dana Winner 1993
- Regenbogen, album by Vanessa Mai 2017
- "Regenbogen", song by Wincent Weiss 2015
- Radio Regenbogen Elmar Hörig

== Military ==
- Operation Regenbogen (disambiguation)
  - Operation Regenbogen (Arctic)
  - Operation Regenbogen (U-boat)

== Other ==
- First Camp German stock-listed company Regenbogen AG
