= Giovanni Semerano =

Italian philologist and linguist

- Born: 21 February 1911; Ostuni, Apulia, Italy
- Died: July 20, 2005 (aged 92)
- Occupations: philologist linguist

Giovanni Semerano (21 February 1913 – 20 July 2005) was an Italian philologist and linguist who studied the languages of Ancient Mesopotamia.

== Biography ==
He attended elementary and middle school in Ostuni; in Bari, instead, he completed his high school education and began his university studies. In the 1930s, he left his family and moved to Florence where he obtained his degree in Florence. Among his teachers were the Hellenist Ettore Bignone, the philologist Giorgio Pasquali, the semitist Giuseppe Furlani and the linguists Giacomo Devoto and Bruno Migliorini.

At the beginning of his career, he taught Greek and Latin in a high school. In 1950 he was appointed Supervisor of Bibliography for Veneto and in 1955 for Tuscany. He taught some lessons of Medieval Latin at the University of Florence in a School of Latin palaeography. Afterwards, he was director of the Biblioteca Laurenziana and then of the Biblioteca Nazionale Centrale of Florence. In 1967 he was honoured with the gold medal for cultural merits. He was an honorary member of the Accademia Etrusca. He was also a member of the Oriental Institute of Chicago.

== Theory ==
Semerano rejected the Indoeuropean theory - taken for granted by mainstream historical linguistics. He emphasized the fact that Indoeuropean is only a constructed language, with no written records. Through comparison of a huge amount of words without convincing etymology in European languages, he argued that many of these originated in Mesopotamia, from the Akkadian and Sumerian languages. According to his supporters, Semerano's works have helped better understand the story of all European languages, not only the ancient and classic ones Indo-european languages like Greek, Latin but also pre-Indo-European languages like Etruscan, and also all other languages and dialects, both modern and ancient, in Italy and Europe.

He is extensively quoted by Jacques R. Pauwels in his 2009 book, Beneath the Dust of Time - also a non-linguist.

== Works ==
=== The Origins of European Culture ===
The origins of the European culture (not yet translated into English) has as subtitle Rivelazioni della linguistica storica (Revelations of historic linguistics - Leo Olschki, Florence 1984–1994). It is divided into 4 volumes, two of which are etymological dictionaries of Greek and Latin and modern entries. They treat thousands of ancient and modern words of European languages, that should be related to the age-old Semitic languages.

The book starts by assuming an old cultural protohistoric unity of Europe and the Middle East, on the basis of a Mesopotamic derivation of many geographic and ethnic terms. The original meaning of the name of many cities, people, rivers, characters, belongings, typical verbs of thought and hand activities are also usually included in a generic Mediterranean substrate that gathers all that cannot be categorized in the Indoeuropean linguistic framework (Continental). The author suggests that the Akkadian language, the language with the oldest and widest written records, should be rather used as an alternative reference framework since it also belongs to the family of Semitic languages and has the oldest evidence of Sumerian substrate, like the tens of thousands of tablets written in cuneiform, discovered in the archives of the old city of Ebla in Syria (Assyria) and dug out by the archaeologists during an Italian mission in 1968.

According to the author, this linguistic framework proves the influence that Mesopotamia had on European civilizations, radiated along the Continental path of the Danube and along the coasts of the Mediterranean Sea, from Africa to Ireland. along the old trade roads of amber, tin and iron.

=== L'infinito: un equivoco millenario ===
The work (The endlessness: a millenary misunderstanding), with the subtitle Le antiche civiltà del Vicino Oriente e le origini del pensiero greco (The oldest civilizations of the Middle East and the origins of the Greek thought), (edited by Bruno Mondadori, 2001, collana "Sintesi" ISBN 88-424-9762-2), aims to revise all languages as entities originating from a common Akkadic and Sumerian matrix. This allows the author to reinterpret radically the entire environment of Archaic and Classic Greece, no longer regarded as a miraculous island of rationality, but as a part of a unique community including Mesopotamia, Anatolia and Egypt.

The theory of the volume is based on a new interpretation of the term Ápeiron, central in Anaximander's philosophy. Anaximander defines the element from which all things originate with the Greek term ápeiron, commonly held to be formed from a (alpha privative, "without") and péras ("determination", "limit"), and thus translated as "endless", "unlimited". According to Semerano, though, since the word péras has a short e, whereas ápeiron has a diphthong ei that reads as a long-closed "e", the diphthong cannot be produced by the short e of péras.

Semerano derives it from a collision of the Semitic term 'apar, the biblical 'afar and with the Akkadic eperu, all meaning "earth". The notorious fragment of Anaximander, in which we read that all things originate and come back to the 'ápeiron would not be referred to a philosophical conception of endlessness, but to a concept of "belonging to the earth" that we can find in a previous sapiential tradition of Asian origin exemplified in the Bible: "dust you are and to dust you will return".

On the basis of this interpretation, Semerano reviews the whole development of previous sophistic philosophy with an anti-idealistic and anti-metaphysic principle, reconsidering the differences and similarities between ancient thinkers and ascribing most of them to corpuscular physics, that brings together Anaximander, Thales and Democritus.

=== Other works ===
- The People that Defeated Death: The Etruscans and their Language- (Bruno Mondadori, 2003)
- The Myth of the Indo-European Language- (Bruno Mondadori, 2005)

== Criticisms ==
Semerano's theories are strongly rejected by most linguists.

=== Indoeuropean language theory ===
Semerano's objections to the Indoeuropean language theory are essentially objections to the theory as propounded by early nineteenth-century German linguists. He does not consider subsequent modifications (for instance, the so-called wave model, in German Wellentheorie), that could correct and refine the first hypotheses. Such refining, it has to be said, is progressively approaching the area where Indoeuropean should have been created (today's Anatolia) in the Mesopotamic area.

Moreover, Semerano's assertions, according to which the existence of Indoeuropean would be implausible, have no evidence in archaeological finds which confirm the theory. For example, the decipherment (successfully completed and enriched through the introduction of new historical data) of Hittite tablets started from the point that it was an Indoeuropean language written in the cuneiform script.

Semerano's whole theory is based on a wide series of approaches of heterogeneous theories with no proposal of an alternative and consistent model to traditional linguistics and with no explanation and definition of linguistic laws that headed the derivation of the various languages examined by the ancient Mesopotamic languages.

=== Derivation of Ápeiron ===
In his reconstruction of the derivation of Ápeiron, Semerano appears not to know an essential element: in the Ionic dialect, unlike the Attic dialect and many other Greek dialects, the alternation between "e" (short vowel) and "ei" (diphthong), is quite common and originates from well-known linguistic dynamics. There are also synonyms of Anaximander's term in Homer , where we read of póntos apéiritos: on Semerano's thesis, this should not be translated as "endless sea" but "earthen sea", which seems unlikely.

=== More examples of Semerano's paretymological approach ===
Another example of Semerano's paretymological approach is his suggestion for the origin of the Latin word res "thing": he ascribes it to the Akkadic rēš "head" (phrase rēšu), neglecting the fact that the final Latin -s is the ending of the nominative (therefore the root of the Latin word being re- -*reh- and not rēš). If he had started from the accusative rem he would instead have been led to the Akkadic word rēmu "belly". Semerano seems to have simply used dictionaries of various languages with little methodological scruple, often deliberately ignoring grammatical structure.

== See also ==
- Black Athena
