= Friedrich Solmsen =

German classical scholar (1904–1989)

- Born: February 4, 1904; Bonn, Germany
- Died: January 30, 1989 (aged 84); Chapel Hill, North Carolina
- Education: Humboldt University of Berlin
- Scientific career
- Fields: Classical philology
- Workplaces: Cornell University, University of Wisconsin-Madison, University of North Carolina at Chapel Hill
- Doctoral advisor: Werner Jaeger
- Other academic advisors: Eduard Norden, Otto Regenbogen, Ulrich von Wilamowitz-Moellendorff

Friedrich Heinrich Rudolf Solmsen (February 4, 1904 – January 30, 1989) was a German-American philologist and professor of classical studies. He published nearly 150 books, monographs, scholarly articles, and reviews from the 1930s through the 1980s. Solmsen's work is characterized by a prevailing interest in the history of ideas. He was an influential scholar in the areas of Greek tragedy, particularly for his work on Aeschylus, and the philosophy of the physical world and its relation to the soul, especially the systems of Plato and Aristotle.

== Life and career ==
Friedrich Solmsen, sometimes called "Fritz" by friends and intimates, was born and educated in Germany. He was among the "Graeca" of Ulrich von Wilamowitz-Moellendorff, the Graeca being a group of "young scholars" who met in his home during his last decade of life to read a Greek author with a view toward emending the text. In an essay fifty years later, Solmsen recalled those years and the legendary philologist in a biographical sketch that combines politico-historical perspective, sociology of academia, and personal, sometimes wry observations. "I do not recall Wilamowitz ever laughing aloud," he mused in a footnoted aside. "Nor did he ever grin." Solmsen was also a student of Eduard Norden, Otto Regenbogen, and Werner Jaeger, to the three of whom along with Wilamowitz he dedicated the first volume of his collected papers. He was one of the last people to whom the terminally ill Wilamowitz addressed correspondence.

Solmsen's dissertation on Aristotelian logic and rhetoric was published in 1928. He left Germany to escape Nazism in the mid-1930s, and after a time in England came to the United States, where he taught at Olivet College (1937–1940) in Michigan. He then moved to Cornell University, where he served a term as chair of the classics department. He taught at Cornell for twenty-two years. Among his courses was "Foundations of Western Thought," which explored the history of philosophical, scientific and religious ideas from early Greece through the Hellenistic and Roman periods.

In 1962, he was named Moses Slaughter Professor of Classical Studies at the University of Wisconsin–Madison. In 1972 he won the Goodwin Award of Merit, presented by the American Philological Association for an outstanding contribution to classical scholarship, for his Oxford Classical Text edition of Hesiod's works, the Theogony, Works and Days, and Shield of Heracles.

Solmsen retired in 1974. In retirement, he lived in Chapel Hill, North Carolina, and continued to publish. He gave occasional lectures at the University of North Carolina, conducted a National Endowment for the Humanities seminar, and led readings in Pindar and Plotinus. The bulk of his library was donated to the university upon his death from a perforated ulcer at the age of 84. He was survived by his wife, Lieselotte. Colleagues mourned him as "one of the last giants of the German tradition of classical humanism."

The Institute for Research in the Humanities at the University of Wisconsin offers four one-year fellowships in his name for postdoctoral work on literary and historical studies of the Classical, Medieval, and Renaissance periods to 1700. The fellowship fund was established by a bequest from Friedrich and Lieselotte Solmsen.

== Works ==
In his essay on Wilamowitz, Solmsen reflected on classical studies as a discipline and an intellectual pursuit within a broadly historical context. "The post-World-War-I generation for whom the value of the Classics had become a problem," he writes, "did not find [from Wilamowitz] an answer to their question what made ancient civilization particularly significant and worth intensive study," adding that Wilamowitz "did not realize the need of justifying their study to a generation for whom the continuity of a tradition that reached back to the age of Goethe was weakened (though not completely broken) and whose outlook was still in the process of formation; many in fact were consciously striving for a new orientation."

The following bibliography, arranged by topic and then chronologically within the topic, attempts to represent the range of Solmsen's contributions to scholarship but is by no means exhaustive. Omitted are most articles in German, reviews, and notes (i.e., articles of less than three pages). The articles are for the most part collected in his Kleine Schriften, 3 vols. (Hildesheim 1968–1982).

=== Hesiod and Homer ===
- Hesiod and Aeschylus. Cornell University Press, 1949; republished with a new foreword by G.M. Kirkwood, 1995. Online preview. ISBN 0-8014-8274-7
- "The Gift of Speech in Homer and Hesiod." Transactions of the American Philological Association 85 (1954) 1–15.
- "Zur Theologie im grossen Aphrodite-Hymnus." Hermes 88 (1960) 1–13.
- "Hesiodic Motifs in Plato." In Hésiode et son influence: six exposées et discussions, edited by Kurt von Fritz (Geneva: Fondation Hardt, 1962) 171–211.
- "The Days of the Works and Days." Transactions of the American Philological Association 94 (1963) 293–320.
- "Ilias XVIII, 535–540." Hermes 93 (1965) 1–6.
- Hesiodi Theogonia, Opera et Dies, Scutum (with selected fragments edited by R. Merkelbach and M.L. West). Oxford: Clarendon Press, 1970. Second edition with a new appendix of fragments, 1983. Third edition, 1990. Oxford Classical Text edition of the Greek text of Hesiod's Theogony, Works and Days, and Shield (usually in translation as the Shield of Heracles).
- "Hesiodic φρόνησις." Classical Philology 71 (1976) 252–253.
- "The Sacrifice of Agamemnon's Daughter in Hesiod's Ehoeae." American Journal of Philology 102 (1981) 353–358.
- "The Earliest Stages in the History of Hesiod's Text." Harvard Studies in Classical Philology 86 (1982) 1–31.
- "The Two Near Eastern Sources of Hesiod." Hermes 117 (1989) 413–422.

=== Greek tragedy ===
- Euripides' Ion im Vergleich mit anderen Tragödien. Berlin 1934.
- "Ὄνομα and πρᾶγμα in Euripides' Helen." Classical Review 48 (1934) 119–121.
- "The Erinys in Aischylos' Septem." Transactions and Proceedings of the American Philological Association 68 (1937) 197–211.
- "Strata of Greek Religion in Aeschylus." Harvard Theological Review 40 (1947) 211–226.
- Hesiod and Aeschylus. See under "Hesiod and Homer" (preceding).
- Electra and Orestes: Three Recognitions in Greek Tragedy. Berlin 1967.
- "'Bad Shame' and Related Problems in Phaedra's Speech (Eur. Hipp. 380–388)." Hermes 101 (1973) 420–425. On a passage from the Hippolytus of Euripides.
- "Φρήν, καρδία, ψυχή in Greek tragedy." In Greek Poetry and Philosophy: Studies in Honour of Leonard Woodbury. Edited by Douglas E. Gerber. Scholars Press, 1984, pp. 265–274.
- "Ἀλλ᾽ εἰδέναι χρὴ δρῶσαν: The Meaning of Sophocles' Trachiniai 588-93." American Journal of Philology 106 (1985) 490–496.

=== Plato ===
- "The Background of Plato's Theology." Transactions and Proceedings of the American Philological Association 67 (1936) 208–218. On Book 10 of Plato's Laws.
- "Plato and the Unity of Science." Philosophical Review 49 (1940) 566–571.
- Plato's Theology. Cornell University Press, 1942. Reviewed at length by William C. Greene in Classical Philology 40 (1945) 128–133.
- "On Plato's Account of Respiration." Studi italiani di filologia classica 27–28 (1956) 544–548.
- "Platonic Influences in the Formation of Aristotle's Physical System." In Aristotle and Plato in the Mid-Fourth Century. Papers of the Symposium Aristotelicum Held at Oxford in August 1957. Edited by Ingemar During and G.E.L. Owen. Göteborg 1960, pp. 213–235.
- "Hesiodic Motifs in Plato." See under "Hesiod and Homer" above.
- "Republic III,389b2–d6: Plato's Draft and the Editor's Mistake." Philologus 109 (1965) 182–185.
- Review of Preface to Plato by Eric A. Havelock (Belknap Press of Harvard University Press, 1963). In American Journal of Philology 87 (1966) 99–105.
- "Plato's First Mover in the Eighth Book of Aristotle's Physics." Philomathes: Studies and Essays in the Humanities in Memory of Philip Merlan. Edited by Robert B. Palmer and Robert Hamerton-Kelly. The Hague: Nijhoff, 1971, pp. 171–182.
- "Plato and Science." In Interpretations of Plato: A Swarthmore Symposium. Edited by Helen F. North. E. J. Brill, 1977.
- "Platonic Values in Aristotle's Science." Journal of the History of Ideas 39 (1978) 3–23.
- "Some Passages in Plato's Laws IV and V." Illinois Classical Studies 5 (1980) 44–48.
- "The Academic and the Alexandrian editions of Plato's Works." Illinois Classical Studies 6 (1981) 102–111.
- "Plato and the Concept of the Soul (Psyche): Some Historical Perspectives." Journal of the History of Ideas 44 (1983) 355–367.

=== Aristotle ===
- Die aristotelische Methodenlehre und die spätplatonische Akademie, dissertation. Berlin 1928. Revised and published as Die Entwicklung der aristotelischen Logik und Rhetorik in 1975 and again in 2001.
- "The Origins and Methods of Aristotle's Poetics." Classical Quarterly 29 (1935) 192–201.
- "The Aristotelian Tradition in Ancient Rhetoric." American Journal of Philology 62 (1941) 35–50 and 169–190.
- "Boethius and the History of the Organon." American Journal of Philology 65 (1944) 69–74.
- "Aristotle's Syllogism and Its Platonic Background." Philosophical Review 60 (1951) 563–571.
- Introduction to the Modern Library edition of Aristotle's Rhetoric, translated by W. Rhys Roberts, and Poetics, translated by Ingram Bywater. New York 1954.
- "Antecedents of Aristotle's Psychology and Scale of Beings." American Journal of Philology 76 (1955) 148–164.
- "Aristotle and Prime Matter: A Reply to H. R. King." Journal of the History of Ideas 19 (1958) 243–252.
- "Aristotle and Presocratic Cosmogony." Harvard Studies in Classical Philology 63 (1958) 265–282.
- Aristotle's System of the Physical World: A Comparison with His Predecessors. Cornell University Press, 1960. This lengthy, densely packed book investigates the natural philosophy of the Presocratics and Plato as well as Aristotle's Physics, De caelo, De generatione et corruptione and Meteorologica.
- "Aristotle's Word for Matter." In Didascaliæ: Studies in Honor of Anselm M. Albareda, Prefect of the Vatican Library. Edited by Sesto Prete. New York 1961, pp. 393–408.
- "Misplaced Passages at the End of Aristotle's Physics." American Journal of Philology 82 (1961) 270–282.
- "Leisure and Play in Aristotle's Ideal state." Rheinisches Museum 107 (1964) 193–220.
- Review of Aristotle and the Problem of Value by Whitney J. Oates (Princeton University Press, 1963). In Journal of Philosophy 62 (1965) 298–303.
- Ursprünge und Methoden der aristotelischen Poetik. Darmstadt 1968.
- "Dialectic without the Forms." In Aristotle on Dialectic: The Topics. Proceedings of the Third Symposium Aristotelicum. Edited by G. E. L. Owen. Oxford: Clarendon Press, 1968, pp. 49–68.
- "The Fishes of Lesbos and Their Alleged Significance for the Development of Aristotle." Hermes 106 (1978) 467–484.
- "Citations in Their Bearing on the Origin of 'Aristotle' Meteorologica IV." Hermes 113 (1985) 448–459.

=== Empedocles, Epicurus, Lucretius ===
- Review of T. Lucreti Cari, De rerum natura, Libri sex, edition and commentary by William Ellery Leonard and Stanley Barney Smith (University of Wisconsin Press, 1942), in Philosophical Review 53 (1944) 208–211.
- "Epicurus and Cosmological Heresies." American Journal of Philology 72 (1951) 1–23.
- "Epicurus on the Growth and Decline of the Cosmos." American Journal of Philology 74 (1953) 34–51.
- Αἴσθησις in Aristotelian and Epicurean Thought. Amsterdam, 1961. Aisthesis originally meant both cognitive perceptions and feelings (as of pleasure and pain); Solmsen traces the restriction of the term by Plato to cognitive perceptions and so in Aristotle and the Stoics; Epicurus, however, uses the word to mean the capacity of feeling pleasure and pain as conveyed by the "soul atoms" generally to the body.
- "Love and Strife in Empedocles' Cosmology." Phronesis 10 (1965) 109–148.
- "Ζωρός in Empedocles." Classical Review 17 (1967) 245–246.
- "A Peculiar Omission in Lucretius' Account of Human Civilization." Philologus 114 (1970) 256–261.
- "Eternal and Temporary Beings in Empedocles' Physical Poem." Archiv für Geschichte der Philosophie 57 (1975) 123–145.
- "Epicurus on Void, Matter and Genesis: Some Historical Observations." Phronesis 22 (1977) 263–281.
- "Empedocles' Hymn to Apollo." Phronesis 35 (1980) 219–227.
- "Abdera's Arguments for the Atomic Theory." Greek, Roman, and Byzantine Studies 29 (1988) 59–73.
- "Lucretius' Strategy in De rerum natura I." Rheinisches Museum 131 (1988) 315–323.

=== Philosophical and literary topics ===
- "Cicero's First Speeches: A Rhetorical Analysis." Transactions and Proceedings of the American Philological Association 69 (1938) 542–556.
- "Some Works of Philostratus the Elder." Transactions and Proceedings of the American Philological Association 71 (1940) 556–572.
- "Eratosthenes as Platonist and Poet." Transactions and Proceedings of the American Philological Association 73 (1942) 192–213.
- "Chaos and Apeiron." Studi italiani di filologia classica 24 (1949) 235–248.
- Review of Empedocles' Mixture, Eudoxan Astronomy and Aristotle's Connate Pneuma by Harald A. T. Reiche (Amsterdam 1960), in American Journal of Philology 84 (1963) 91–94.
- The Eleatic One in Melissus. Amsterdam, 1969.
- "Tissues and the Soul: Philosophical Contributions to Physiology." Philosophical Review 59 (1950) 435–468.
- "Neglected Evidence for Cicero's De re publica." Museum Helveticum 13 (1956) 38–53.
- "The Vital Heat, the Inborn Pneuma and the Aether." Journal of Hellenic Studies 77 (1957) 119–123.
- "Greek Philosophy and the Discovery of the Nerves." Museum Helveticum 18 (1961) 150–167 and 169–197.
- Cleanthes or Posidonius? The Basis of Stoic physics. Amsterdam 1961. A study of the sources of Cicero's De Natura Deorum, II, 23–32.
- "Anaximander's Infinite: Traces and Influences." Archiv für Geschichte der Philosophie 44 (1962) 109–131.
- "Anaxagoras B 19 Diels-Kranz." Hermes 91 (1963) 250–251.
- "Nature as Craftsman in Greek Thought." Journal of the History of Ideas 24 (1963) 473–496.
- "Diogenes of Apollonia B3D.-K." Classical Review 20 (1970) 6.
- "Thucydides' Treatment of Words and Concepts." Hermes 99 (1971) 385–408.
- "The Tradition about Zeno of Elea Re-examined." Phronesis 16 (1971) 116–141.
- "Parmenides and the Description of Perfect Beauty in Plato's Symposium." American Journal of Philology 92 (1971) 62–70.
- Intellectual Experiments of the Greek Enlightenment. Princeton University Press, 1975. Six chapters dealing with such topics as argumentation, persuasion, utopianism and reform, language experiments, and empirical psychology.
- "Light from Aristotle's Physics on the text of Parmenides B 8 D-K." Phronesis 1977 XXII : 10–12.
- "Theophrastus and Political Aspects of the Belief in Providence." Greek, Roman, and Byzantine Studies 19 (1978) 91–98.
- "Emendations in Cosmological Texts." Rheinisches Museum 124 (1981) 1–18.
- "Plotinus v,5,3,21 ff.: A Passage on Zeus." Museum Helveticum 43 (1986) 68–73.

=== Augustan poetry ===
- "Horace's First Roman Ode." American Journal of Philology 68 (1947) 337–352.
- "Propertius in his Literary Relations with Tibullus and Vergil." Philologus 105 (1961) 273–289.
- "Three Elegies of Propertius' First Book." Classical Philology 57 (1962) 73–88.
- "Tibullus as an Augustan poet." Hermes 90 (1962) 295–325.
- "On Propertius I, 7." American Journal of Philology 86 (1965) 77–84.
- "Catullus' Artistry in C. 68: A Pre-Augustan Subjective Love-Elegy." Monumentum Chiloniense: Studien zur augusteischen Zeit. Kieler Festschrift für Erich Burck zum 70. Geburtstag. Edited by Eckard Lefèvre. Amsterdam 1975, pp. 260–276.

=== Afterlife, religion, myth ===
- Review of The Greeks and the Irrational by E.R. Dodds, in American Journal of Philology 75 (1954) 190–196.
- Review of Αἰών da Omero ad Aristotele by Enzo Degani (University of Padua, 1961). In American Journal of Philology 84 (1963) 329–332.
- "Two Pindaric Passages on the Hereafter." Hermes 96 (1968) 503–506.
- "Greek Ideas of the Hereafter in Vergil's Roman Epic." "Proceedings of the American Philosophical Society" 92 (1968) 8–14.
- "Ἀμοιβή in the Recently Discovered 'Orphic' Katabasis." Hermes 96 (1968) 631–632.
- "The World of the Dead in Book 6 of the Aeneid." Classical Philology 67 (1972) 31–41.
- "Symphytos Aion (A., Ag. 106)." American Journal of Philology 100 (1979) 477–479. On Aeschylus, Agamemnon, line 106.
- Isis among the Greeks and Romans. Harvard University Press, 1979. "It was a surprise, but also a pleasure," noted J. Gwyn Griffiths, "to find Friedrich Solmsen concerning himself with the impact of Isis on the Graeco-Roman world."
- "Achilles on the Islands of the Blessed: Pindar vs. Homer and Hesiod." American Journal of Philology 103 (1982) 19–24.
- "'Aeneas Founded Rome with Odysseus.'" Harvard Studies in Classical Philology 90 (1986) 93–110.

=== Christian topics ===
- "The Powers of Darkness in Prudentius' Contra Symmachum: A Study of His Poetic Imagination." Vigiliae Christianae 19 (1965) 237–257.
- "The Conclusion of Theodosius' Oration in Prudentius' Contra Symmachum." Philologus 109 (1965) 310–313.
- "Providence and the Soul: A Platonic Chapter in Clement of Alexandria." Museum Helveticum 26 (1969) 229–251.
- "George A. Wells on Christmas in Early New Testament Criticism." Journal of the History of Ideas 31 (1970) 277–280.
- "Early Christian Interest in the Theory of Demonstration." In Romanitas et Christianitas; studia Iano Henrico Waszink. Edited by W. den Boer. Amsterdam 1973, pp. 281–291.
- "Reincarnation in Ancient and Early Christian Thought." In Kleine Schriften, vol. 3. Hildesheim 1982, pp. 465–494.

== Bibliography ==
- Solmsen, Friedrich (February 10, 1989). "Friedrich Solmsen, Professor, 84". The New York Times.
- Kirkwood, G.M. "Foreword to the Paperback Edition." In Hesiod and Aeschylus by Friedrich Solmsen. Cornell University Press, 1995, pp. ix–xi.
- Solmsen, Friedrich. Kleine Schriften, 3 vols. Hildesheim 1968–1982.
- Solmsen, Friedrich. "Wilamowitz in His Last Ten Years." Greek, Roman and Byzantine Studies 20 (1979) 89–122.
- Tabulae. Newsletter of the Department of Classics, University of North Carolina (Fall 1989), pp. iii–iv.
- Ward, Leo R. My Fifty Years at Notre Dame, chapter 6.
