= Scevola Mariotti =

Italian classical scholar (1920–2000)

Scevola Mariotti FBA
- Born: 24 April 1920; Pesaro, Marche, Kingdom of Italy
- Died: 6 January 2000 (aged 79); Rome, Lazio, Italy
- Occupation: University professor
- Relatives: Italo Mariotti (brother)

Academic background
- Education: University of Pisa; Scuola Normale Superiore; University of Florence; University of Urbino
- Alma mater: University of Urbino (thesis defended); University of Florence (de iure)
- Thesis: L'Aristotele perduto
- Doctoral advisor: none

Academic work
- Discipline: Classical philology
- Sub-discipline: Latin literature
- Institutions: University of Urbino (1956–1963); Sapienza University of Rome (1963–1996)
- Notable works: IL – Dizionario della Lingua Latina

Scevola Mariotti (24 April 1920 – 6 January 2000) was an Italian classical scholar, lexicographer and university professor who taught at the Universities of Urbino and Rome. He was Emeritus in Latin literature at the Sapienza University of Rome.

== Biography ==
Born in Pesaro from Scevola sr. and Teresa Mariotti, at 17 years of age he enrolled in the University of Pisa and won a studentship at the Scuola Normale Superiore, where he studied Ancient Greek literature with Augusto Mancini and German language and literature with Paul Oskar Kristeller, also attending Giorgio Pasquali's lectures in Classical philology. However, he left the 'Normale' in 1940: on 13 May of that year, he publicly dissented with a group of fascist students who were celebrating Italy's declaration of war against France, on Nazi Germany's side, and was suspended from the school (also risking expulsion from Italy's whole university system, which he avoided thanks to Giovanni Gentile's intervention); when the suspension expired in autumn, he decided to leave the college and enrolled in the University of Florence, where he planned to graduate under Pasquali's tutorage. He began working on a dissertation on the authenticity of Plato's epistles, but Pasquali's leave due to a nervous illness, as well as wartime, forced Mariotti to return to Marche where he worked as temporary teacher at the Liceo Classico "Mamiani" in Pesaro (the high school he had gone to).

He eventually graduated in 1945 at the University of Urbino, although he 'bureaucratically' was a University of Florence alumnus. His dissertation, on the topic of Aristotle's juvenile (and lost) works, was prepared in one hour and delivered as a speech, with Mariotti defending it without preparing a written essay. He was habilitated to secondary school teaching and assigned to teach Italian literature and Latin language and literature the Liceo Scientifico "Marconi" in Pesaro; in 1949 he became teaching assistant in Latin language and literature at the University of Urbino and in 1956 the faculty promoted him to tenured professorship. In 1963 he moved to the Sapienza University of Rome, where he was Professor in Latin literature until 1990; in 1996 he retired and was nominated Emeritus.

=== Private life ===
His father, Scevola sr., taught French language and literature at the Mamiani high school in Pesaro and edited a French-Italian vocabulary. Scevola Mariotti had a sister, Eleonora Travaglini (d. 2018, aged 91), teacher of Italian language and literature in public middle schools, and a brother, Italo Mariotti (1928–2014), Emeritus in Classical philology at the University of Bologna.

Mariotti had married Antonietta "Tota" Gaudiano in 1953; they had one daughter, Flavia (b. 1955), and remained together until his death. Scevola Mariotti died in Rome on Epiphany 2000, after a short illness.

== Research activity ==
Mariotti published his first research article in 1938, when he was barely eighteen, discovering a neglected fragment of a juvenile dialogue by Aristotle. By the time he graduated in 1945, he had also already published on Synesius (under the impulse of Nicola Terzaghi's then-recent critical edition of Synesius' hymns), Macrobius and Martianus Capella, Lorenzo Valla and was working on Enea Silvio Piccolomini.

Mariotti wrote on a wide range of subjects, including the Latin language in contemporary schools and universities and school reforms. He showed that the textual transmission of Virgil's Aeneid might contain authorial variants and wrote on the Greek and Latin Anthology, the Epigrammata Bobiensia, and technical and grammatical treatises of Late antiquity, as well as classical authors such as Horace, Apuleius and Catullus. He also studied Medieval and Renaissance Latin, and wrote on Italian literature (Dante and Poliziano).

His best-known work is IL – Vocabolario della Lingua Latina, which he completed following Luigi Castiglioni's death.

== Works (selection) ==
- Mariotti, S. (1938). "Un passo di Servio e l'Eudemo di Aristotele". Studi Italiani di Filologia Classica. 15: 83–85.
- Mariotti, S. (1940a). "Cicerone e una fonte stoica dipendente da Aristotele". Studi Italiani di Filologia Classica. 17: 76–78.
- Mariotti, S. (1940b). "De quibusdam Macrobii et Martiani locis ad codicum lectionem restituendis". Annali della Scuola Normale Superiore di Pisa. Lettere, Storia e Filosofia. 9 (3): 196–197. JSTOR 24298967.
- Mariotti, S. (1940c). "La «quinta essenza» nell'Aristotele perduto e nell'Accademia". Rivista di filologia. 68: 179–189.
- Mariotti, S. (1940d). "Nuove testimonianze ed echi dell'Aristotele giovanile". Atene e Roma. 8 (1): 48–60.
- Mariotti, S. (1940e). "Sul testo di alcuni epigrammi attribuiti a Lorenzo Valla". Athenaeum. 28: 179–182.
- Mariotti, S. (1942b). "Nota agl'Inni di Sinesio". Studi Italiani di Filologia Classica. 19: 3–24.
- Mariotti, S. (1946). "Sul testo e le fonti comiche della CHRYSIS di E. S. Piccolomini". Annali della Scuola Normale Superiore di Pisa. Lettere, Storia e Filosofia. 15 (1/2): 118–130. JSTOR 24299178.
- Mariotti, S. (1947a). "De Synesii Hymnorum memoria". Studi Italiani di Filologia Classica. 25: 215–220.
- Mariotti, S. (1947b). "Composizione latina ai concorsi". Belfagor. 2 (6): 754–755. JSTOR 26040113.
- Mariotti, S. (1947c). "Congetture all'Anthologia Latina". Parola del Passato. 2: 346–348.
- Mariotti, S. (1947d). "Nota a Catullo c. LI". Paideia. 2: 303.
- Mariotti, S. (1947e). "Per lo studio dei dialoghi del Pontano". Belfagor. 2 (3): 332–344. JSTOR 26040047.
- Mariotti, S. (1947f). "Un'etimologia medievale del nome Maro". Paideia. 2: 303.
- Mariotti, S. (1947g). "Varianti d'autore nella tradizione diretta dell'Eneide?". Paideia. 2: 303.
- Mariotti, S. (1948). "Note a PSI 1305". Annali della Scuola Normale Superiore di Pisa. Lettere, Storia e Filosofia. 17 (3/4): 223–228. JSTOR 24299271.
- Mariotti, S. (1952b). "Note al testo di Consenzio, Ars de barbarismis et metaplamis". Studi Urbinati. B1 (36): 196–198.
- Mariotti, S. (1956). "Su una progettata riforma degli esami di maturità". Belfagor. 11 (6): 710–712. JSTOR 26068509.
- Campana, A.; Campanile, E.; Mariotti, A.; Timpanaro, S. (1958). "Contributi agli Epigrammata Bobiensia". Annali della Scuola Normale Superiore di Pisa. Lettere, Storia e Filosofia. 27 (1/2): 121–125. JSTOR 24300018.
- Castiglioni, L.; Mariotti, S., eds. (1966). IL – Dizionario della Lingua Latina. Turin: Loescher.
  - Castiglioni, L.; Mariotti, S., eds. (1990). IL – Dizionario della Lingua Latina (2nd ed.). Turin: Loescher.
  - Castiglioni, L.; Mariotti, S., eds. (1994). IL – Dizionario della Lingua Latina. With M. De Nonno (3rd ed.). Turin: Loescher.
  - Castiglioni, L.; Mariotti, S., eds. (2006). IL – Dizionario della Lingua Latina. Revised by P. Parroni (4th ed.). Turin: Loescher.
- Mariotti, S. (1966). Sacconi, A. (ed.). Il V libro dell'Antologia Palatina. Appunti dalle lezioni, a.a. 1964-65. Rome: Edizioni dell'Ateneo.
- Mariotti, S. (1972a). "Catullo 66, 58". Studi Classici e Orientali. 21: 56–59. JSTOR 24181157.
- Mariotti, S. (1972b). "Il canto VI del Paradiso". Nuove letture dantesche. Anno di studi 1969–1970. Vol. V. Florence: Le Monnier. pp. 375–404.
- Mariotti, S. (1975). "Il cristianesimo di Stazio in Dante secondo il Poliziano". In Binni, W.; Castellani, A. (eds.). Letteratura e critica. Studi in onore di Natalino Sapegno. Vol. II. Rome: Bulzoni. pp. 149–161.
- Mariotti, S. (1984). "Il Fragmentum Bobiense de nomine (Gramm Lat. VII 540-544 Keil)". In Questa, C.; Raffaelli, R. (eds.). Atti del Convegno internazionale "Il libro e il testo", Urbino, 20-23 settembre 1982. Urbino: QuattroVenti. pp. 59–68.
- Mariotti, S. (1986) [Milano: De Silvestri (1952)]. Livio Andronico e la traduzione artistica: saggio critico ed edizione dei frammenti dell'Odyssea (2nd ed.). Urbino: QuattroVenti.
- Mariotti, S. (1991) [Pesaro: Federici (1951)]. Lezioni su Ennio (2nd ed.). Urbino: QuattroVenti. ISBN 9788839202154.
- Mariotti, S. (2001) [Roma: Signorelli (1955)]. Parroni, P. (ed.). Il Bellum Poenicum e l'arte di Nevio (3rd ed.). Bologna: Patron. ISBN 9788855525985.

=== Kleine Schriften ===
- Mariotti, S. (2000). De Nonno, M.; Gamberale, L. (eds.). Scritti di filologia classica. Rome: Salerno Editrice. ISBN 9788884023056.
- Mariotti, S. (2010) [1976; 1994]. Rizzo, S. (ed.). Scritti medievali e umanistici. Raccolta di Studi e Testi, 137 (3rd ed.). Rome: Edizioni di Storia e Letteratura. ISBN 9788863721485.

== Honours ==
- Honorary degree, Eötvös Loránd University (Budapest).
- Honorary degree, National and Kapodistrian University of Athens.
- Honorary degree, University of Urbino.
- Non-resident Fellow, Academy of Sciences in Turin, 1996–2000; Correspondent Fellow, 1992–1996.
- Fellow, Accademia Nazionale dei Lincei, 1988–2000.
- Fellow and Pro Custode, Accademia dell'Arcadia.
- International Fellow, Bavarian Academy of Sciences and Humanities.
- International Fellow, British Academy, 1989–2000.
- International Fellow, Polish Academy of Sciences.
- De Nonno et al. 2012 (Gedenkschrift).

== Trivia ==
- Among his peers at the 'Normale' was Carlo Azeglio Ciampi, future President of Italy.

== Bibliography ==
- Casavola, F. P. (2000). "Ricordo di Scevola Mariotti" (PDF). Eikasmos. 11: 359–362 – via unibo.
- Cagnetta, M. (1990). Antichità classiche nell'Enciclopedia italiana. Rome – Bari: Laterza. ISBN 9788842035985.
- Ciampi, C. A. (2012). "Letter sent to the congress in memory of Scevola Mariotti". De Nonno et al. 2012. p. 325.
- Citti, F.; De Paolis, P.; Funari, G.; Galli, L. (2024). "La filologia di Italo Mariotti". Eikasmos. 35: 419–514.
- De Nonno, M. (2000). "Scevola Mariotti†". Gnomon. 74 (3): 279–285. JSTOR 27693287.
- De Nonno, M.; Di Giovine, C.; Gamberale, L.; Passalacqua, M., eds. (2012). Le strade della filologia. Per Scevola Mariotti. Rome: Edizioni di Storia e Letteratura. ISBN 9788863724486.
- De Paolis, P. (2021). "Mariotti, Scevola (1920–2000)". In Iodice, M.; Spataro, G. (eds.). Dizionario dei latinisti italiani del XX secolo. Rome: Las. pp. 117–127. ISBN 9788821315275.
- Mariotti, S. (sr.), ed. (1952). Vocabolario Francese–Italiano Italiano–Francese. Milan: Signorelli.
- Rosellini, M. (2000). "Ricordo di Scevola Mariotti". La Parola del Testo. 4 (1): 187–192.
- Synesius of Cyrene (1939). Terzaghi, N. (ed.). Hymni. Romae: Typis Officinae Polygraphicae.
- Timpanaro, S. (1993). "Scevola Mariotti". Belfagor. 48 (3): 271–326. JSTOR 26147371.
- Traina, A. (2014). "Per Italo Mariotti" (PDF). Eikasmos. 25: 455–456 – via unibo.
- Uguccioni, R. P. (8 January 2020). "Scevola Mariotti, il prof. che si laureò in un'ora". Il resto del Carlino • Pesaro.
