= Chirichiello =

Chirichiello is a surname of Italian origin.

== People with the surname ==
- Brian Chirichiello, American politician
- Giuseppe Chirichiello (born 1948), Italian economist and professor

== See also ==
- Cristina Chirichella
