= Sulpicia (satirist) =

1st-century Roman poet and satirist

- Born: Before 68 CE
- Died: c. 95-98 CE
- Occupation: Poet
- Spouse: Calenus

Sulpicia (Note: An earlier Roman poet, whose works survive better, was also called Sulpicia. Various ways have been tried to make it explicit which Sulpicia is being discussed in cases of ambiguity. The later Sulpicia has been called Sulpicia Caleni ("wife of Calenus"), Martial's Sulpicia, Sulpicia the satirist, the "other Sulpicia", and Sulpicia II.) was an ancient Roman poet who was active during the reign of the emperor Domitian (r. AD 81–96). She is mostly known through two poems of Martial; she is also mentioned by Ausonius, Sidonius Apollinaris, and Fulgentius. A seventy-line hexameter poem and two lines of iambic trimeter attributed to her survive; the hexameters are now generally thought to have been a fourth- or fifth-century imitation of Sulpicia. Judging by the ancient references to her and the single surviving couplet of her poetry, Sulpicia wrote love poetry discussing her desire for her husband, and was known for her frank sexuality.

== Life ==
Little is known of Sulpicia's life. She was married to a man named Calenus, likely a patron of the Roman poet Martial, who is the source of most of what is known about her. Martial mentions her in two poems, and praises her faithfulness. His epigram 10.38 suggests that Sulpicia and Calenus were married for at least 15 years, at which point, judging by ancient Roman marriage norms, Sulpicia would have been at least 30. (Note: Book 10 of Martial's epigrams was published in 95 AD and revised and republished in 98 AD; Sulpicia was therefore born no later than 68 AD.) The poem is usually read as a poem of consolation after Sulpicia's death, (Note: By, for example, Hallett 1992, Parker 1992, Hemelrijk 2004, and Citrioni 2016) though Amy Richlin has argued that it might instead have been written about Sulpicia and Calenus having divorced, and Edward Courtney suggested that it is celebrating an anniversary. If it was written as a consolation for Sulpicia's death, she probably died between 95 and 98 AD.

As Sulpicia is also the name of the only other Roman woman poet about whom any substantial information has survived, Thomas K. Hubbard suggests that her name was a pseudonym borrowed from the earlier Sulpicia. Alternatively, Jane Stevenson suggests that the gens Sulpicia was particularly willing to educate its women.

== Poetry ==
Sulpicia seems to have written poetry that was erotic or satirical. (Note: Amy Richlin identifies Sulpicia as a "lost Roman satirist". Emily Hemelrijk argues that the evidence that Sulpicia wrote satire is unconvincing.) She is the only woman known from antiquity who was associated with a comic genre. Judging by the surviving testimonia on Sulpicia, she openly discussed her sexual desire for her husband; this outspoken centring of female sexual desire is extremely unusual among ancient women poets. By contrast with the male love poets of ancient Rome, however, Sulpicia portrays her desire only within the context of her marriage.

Two lines of iambic trimeter attributed to Sulpicia are quoted by a scholiast on Juvenal. These lines are generally accepted as the only surviving fragment of Sulpicia's poetry. The manuscript with the scholion is now lost, but it was quoted by Giorgio Valla in his 1486 edition of Juvenal. The text quoted by Valla is attributed to "Sulpicius", and was first identified as a fragment of Sulpicia by the 16th-century scholar Pierre Pithou based on the mention of Calenus. The text transmitted by Valla is corrupt (Note: Hemelrijk describes Valla's text as "incomprehensible and metrically incorrect".) and the meaning continues to be debated, though the lines apparently come from one of the erotic poems about Calenus that are mentioned by Martial.

si me cadurci restitutis fasciis
nudam Caleno concubantem proferat

Translation:

If [something] reveals me lying naked with Calenus when the linen bed-girth has been restored

=== Sulpiciae Conquestio ===
A seventy-line hexameter poem on the expulsion from Rome of Greek philosophers by Domitian was for a long time attributed to Sulpicia. The poem was preserved in an anthology from the early fifth century. The only manuscript known to have survived antiquity, the Epigrammata Bobiensia, preserved at Bobbio Abbey in northern Italy, is now lost; the modern text of the poem derives from four copies of a transcript made of the manuscript in the late 15th century. The poem, known as the Sulpiciae Conquestio (Sulpicia's Complaint) was first printed in 1498, and its authorship remained unquestioned until the second half of the 19th century. In 1868, J. C. G. Boot argued that the poem was a 15th-century composition; in 1873 Emil Baehrens was the first to suggest it was a work of late antiquity. Modern scholars generally consider that the work was not by Sulpicia, and was composed in the fourth or fifth century AD.

The only information about Sulpicia that the Conquestio adds to that transmitted by Martial is the mention of three metres that she wrote in: hendecasyllables, iambic trimeters, and scazons. (Note: The reference to iambic trimeters here, a detail not derivable from Martial, provides further support for the identification of the couplet quoted by the scholiast on Juvenal as an authentic fragment of Sulpicia.) It is unclear why the poem imitated Sulpicia, as she is otherwise only associated with love poetry, rather than the political satire of the Conquestio. Jane Stevenson suggests that this is evidence of Sulpicia having written more broadly than just love poetry.

== Reception ==
Martial compares Sulpicia's poetry, along with her conduct, favourably to Sappho. Her poetry seems to have continued to be known and well thought of into the fifth century – she is mentioned alongside Plato, Cicero, Martial, and Juvenal by Ausonius and Sidonius Apollinaris. She is also mentioned by the mythographer Fulgentius, though it is unclear whether he had read her work or only knew of her through Ausonius. Sulpicia's poetry was well known enough for a scholiast on Juvenal to quote, and for the author of the Conquestio to adopt her identity. During this period, Sulpicia was apparently best known for the sexual nature of her poetry.

Sulpicia continued to be remembered through the medieval period into the Renaissance due to the two epigrams by Martial which mention her. In the modern world, almost nothing is known of her: Josephine Balmer describes her as "among some stiff competition ... probably the most shadowy figure of all the classical women poets". As all but two lines of her poetry are now lost, it is impossible to judge her writing today.

== Works cited ==
- Balmer, Josephine (1996). Classical Women Poets. Newcastle-upon-Tyne: Bloodaxe Books. ISBN 1-85224-342-2.
- Butrica, J. L. (2000). "Sulpiciae Conquestio". Curculio.
- Butrica, J. L. (2006). "The Fabella of Sulpicia ("Epigrammata Bobiensia" 37)". Phoenix. 60 (1/2).
- Citrioni, Mario (7 March 2016). "Sulpicia (2), Latin Poet". Oxford Classical Dictionary. doi:10.1093/acrefore/9780199381135.013.6127.
- Courtney, Edward (2003). The Fragmentary Latin Poets. Oxford: Oxford University Press. ISBN 0198147759.
- Hallett, Judith (1992). "Martial's Sulpicia and Propertius' Cynthia". The Classical World. 86 (2): 99–123. doi:10.2307/4351256. JSTOR 4351256.
- Hallett, Judith (2013). "The Fragment of Martial's Sulpicia". In Churchill, Laurie J.; Brown, Phyllis R.; Jeffrey, Jane E. (eds.). Women Writing Latin From Roman Antiquity to Early Modern Europe. Vol. 1: Women Writing Latin in Roman Antiquity, Late Antiquity, and the Early Christian Era. New York: Routledge. ISBN 9780203954102.
- Hemelrijk, Emily (2004). Matrona Docta: Educated Women in the Roman Elite from Cornelia to Julia Domna. Routledge. ISBN 0415341272.
- Hubbard, Thomas K. (2004). "The Invention of Sulpicia". The Classical Journal. 100 (2): 177–194. JSTOR 4132992.
- Merriam, Carol U. (1991). "The Other Sulpicia". The Classical World. 84 (4): 303–305. doi:10.2307/4350812. JSTOR 4350812.
- Parker, Holt (1992). "Other Remarks on the Other Sulpicia". The Classical World. 86 (2): 89–95. doi:10.2307/4351255. JSTOR 4351255.
- Richlin, Amy (1992). "Sulpicia the Satirist". The Classical World. 86 (2): 125–140. doi:10.2307/4351257. JSTOR 4351257.
- Richlin, Amy (2014). Arguments with Silence: Writing the History of Roman Women. University of Michigan Press. ISBN 9780472035922.
- Stevenson, Jane (2005). Women and Latin in the Early Modern Period. Oxford University Press. ISBN 9780198185024.
