= Kleine Schriften =

German phrase

Kleine Schriften is a German phrase ("short writings" or "minor works"; Latin: Opuscula) often used as a title for a collection of articles and essays written by a single scholar over the course of a career. "Collected Papers" is an English equivalent. These shorter works were usually published previously in various periodicals or in collections of papers (such as a Festschrift) written by multiple scholars. A scholar's Kleine Schriften may be contained in a single volume, or several volumes published at once or (more commonly) in series within a period of a few years. Multi-volume collections may contain a scholar's minor or lesser-known book-length works as well.

The title is usually reserved for the collected works of a scholar who wrote primarily in German or whose first language was German. The collection of a scholar who worked or taught internationally will often contain essays in more than one language; the multi-volume Kleine Schriften of Walter Burkert, for instance, includes work in German, English, and French. In the case of expatriates, articles in the host language may outnumber those in German. This is particularly true of German philologists who emigrated in the 1930s, many of whom published much of their research in English or French; Friedrich Solmsen's three-volume Kleine Schriften, in which English articles outnumber German, is an example.

Kleine Schriften may also appear as an explanatory subtitle; for example, Gotica: kleine Schriften zur gotischen Philologie, a collection of papers on the extinct Gothic language by Ernst A. Ebbinghaus.

== See also ==
- Festschrift
