= Ludwig Radermacher =

German-Austrian classical philologist

Ludwig Radermacher

Ludwig Radermacher (31 October 1867 – 28 June 1952) was a German-Austrian classical philologist born in Siegburg.

In 1891 he earned his doctorate at the University of Bonn, where he was a student of Hermann Usener (1834–1905). Following graduation he remained in Bonn, where he assisted Usener with the works of Dionysius of Halicarnassus. In 1903 he became an associate professor at the University of Greifswald and three years later relocated to the University of Münster. In 1909 he succeeded Theodor Gomperz (1832-1912) as chair of classical philology at the University of Vienna, where he remained until his retirement in 1937. In 1915 he became a member of the Austrian Academy of Sciences (AAS).

== Published works ==
Radermacher specialized in research of classical rhetoric, folklore and mythology. Among his many written works was an edition of Quintilian's twelve-volume book on best practices in the education of a young orator, "Institutio Oratoria". A few of his other significant writings are:

- Observationes in Euripidem miscellae (Various Observations on the texts of Euripides), 1891.
- Das Jenseits im Mythos der Hellenen (The Afterlife in the myths of the Hellenes), 1903.
- Beiträge zur Volkskunde aus dem Gebiet der Antike (Contributions to the (modern) study of Folklore from the realm of Antiquity), 1918.
- Aristophanes Frösche (a critical edition of Aristophanes' "The Frogs"), 1921.
- Zur Geschichte der griechischen Komödie (On the History of Greek Comedy), 1924.
- Mythos und Sage bei den Griechen (Myth and Legend Among the Greeks)
- Altgriechische Liebesgeschichten (Ancient Greek Love Stories),
- Koine (Koine [Common Greek dialect of the New Testament period]).
- Neutestamentliche Grammatik (New Testament Greek grammar).
