= Giorgio Pasquali =

Italian classical philologist (1885–1952)

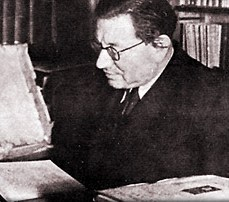
- Giorgio Pasquali in 1948
- Born: 29 April 1885; Rome, Lazio, Kingdom of Italy
- Died: July 9, 1952 (aged 67); Belluno, Veneto, Italy
- Occupation: University professor
- Known for: Storia della tradizione e critica del testo

Academic background
- Education: Sapienza University of Rome; Georg-August-Universität at Göttingen; Friedrich-Wilhelms-Universität at Berlin
- Alma mater: Sapienza University of Rome
- Thesis: La commedia mitologica e i suoi precedenti nella letteratura greca
- Doctoral advisor: Nicola Festa
- Other advisors: Friedrich Leo; Eduard Schwartz; Jakob Wackernagel; Ulrich von Wilamowitz-Moellendorff

Academic work
- Discipline: Classics
- Sub-discipline: Classical philology
- Institutions: Sapienza University of Rome; University of Messina; Georg-August-Universität; Friedrich-Wilhelms-Universität; University of Florence
- Notable students: Antonio La Penna; Scevola Mariotti (de facto); Sebastiano Timpanaro

Giorgio Federico Guglielmo Ercole Francesco Pasquali (29 April 1885, Rome – 9 July 1952, Belluno) was an Italian classical scholar who gave a fundamental contribution to the field of textual criticism.

== Biography ==
=== Origins and education ===
Pasquali was born in Rome in an upper-class family ("generone"). His father, Gustavo Pasquali, Dr. jur., was a barrister and a lawyer for the Austrian and German Embassies, while his paternal grandfather Ercole Pasquali was a university professor and a gynecologist for the House of Savoy; Pasquali's mother, Anna Lasagni Pasquali, was a nephew of Cardinal Pietro Lasagni.

Pasquali grew up in a privileged environment, as admitted by himself:

Noi siamo stati, da ragazzi, signorini, che non avevano pratica con artigiani ed operai; contadini, non so se ne abbiamo conosciuto uno solo, tutt’al più qualche bagnino; la nostra compagnia era di figli di proprietari di case, avvocati, medici, ingegneri, o almeno alti impiegati.

[When we were kids, we were little lords, and customarily not associated with working-class; farmers, I don't know if we have even met one — some lifeguards, perhaps; in our group, there were children of landlords, of lawyers, surgeons, engineers, senior employees.]

— Pasquali 2013, p. 20

Thanks to his father's work for the German embassy he had access to the Rome division of the German Archaeological Institute, and frequented the Faculty of Classics of La Sapienza when he still was in high school, attending the seminaries held by Nicola Festa. Once he had graduated from high school, he enrolled at Sapienza and graduated in 1907, defending a dissertation titled "La commedia mitologica e i suoi precedenti nella letteratura greca". The thesis is now lost, but in 2021 Anna Di Giglio (University of Foggia) was able to unearth some sixty-five typescript sheets from the archives of the Accademia della Crusca, containing the proofs of three chapters of Pasquali's thesis; the surviving sheets are divided into three chapters, devoted to an analysis of pseuod-Homeric Batrachomyomachia, an historical survey of the remainings of the Doric comedy, and an historical survey of the Attic comedy before Aristophanes. However, the document is very likely incomplete, for in it Pasquali refers to two chapters (devoted to the Homer and to the Homeric hymn to Hermes respectively) that have not come down to us.

=== Between Italy and Germany ===
Pasquali's advisor, Nicola Festa, was instrumental in building his future lines of research, for it was Festa who introduced Pasquali to lesser-known authors — like Proclus — and gave him "the book that revealed philology [to him]", i.e. Ulrich von Wilamowitz-Moellendorff's edition of the play Herakles by Euripides. Immediately after graduating, Pasquali began working on a book, which Enzo Degani identified with the dissertation (which was never published), and Giovanni Pascucci with 1913's Quaestiones Callimacheae. In the meantime, Pasquali also won a scholarship to study abroad, and choose to enroll for the 1908 winter term in the Georg-August-Universität at Göttingen – studying with Friedrich Leo, Jacob Wackernagel and Eduard Schwartz – and for the 1909 summer term in the Friedrich-Wilhelms-Universität at Berlin, where he attended Wilamowitz' seminars. In Göttingen, he was invited to join the staff that was working on a critical edition of Gregory of Nyssa's works.

In 1909 he returned to Italy and immediately applied for the position of Professor in Greek literature at the University of Catania, but despite being praised by the judging commission, he failed to obtain the job. The next year he was habilitated to university teaching and became teaching assistant in Greek literature at the Sapienza. In 1911–1912 he was substitute professor in Greek literature at the University of Messina; in the meantime (summer of 1912) he was habilitated to university teaching in Germany and starting from the winter term of 1912–1913 he held the seminar of Classical philology at the University of Göttingen, on behalf of Leo, also teaching Greek classes for jurists. In these years he met and befriended Max Pohlenz. In 1914 he applied for another teaching competition in Italy, this time announced by the Regia Accademia Scientifico-Letteraria in Milan. But – despite being openly and vibrantly supported and defended by Girolamo Vitelli – he was rejected again. In the fall of the same year Pasquali left Germany, after the start of the Great War, but almost immediately returned, in Berlin, where he was teaching assistant from November 1914 to April 1915. However, he had already left Germany in 1914, shortly after the assassination of Archduke Franz Ferdinand.

=== University tenure (Messina and Florence) ===
In 1915, Vitelli retired from teaching and explicitly wanted Pasquali to be his successor. Pasquali became non-tenured fellow assigned to teach Greek literature – and, from 1918 to 1920, German literature too – and so remained until 1920, when he became Professor in Greek literature at the University of Messina. He returned to Florence in 1921 as tenured Professor in Greek literature; in 1924 he became Professor in Classical philology and started teaching, alternatively with Ettore Bignone, Greek and Latin literature. Starting from 1931, Giovanni Gentile wanted him to teach seminars in Classical philology at the Scuola Normale Superiore.

In 1925 he signed the Manifesto of the Anti-Fascist Intellectuals. He received various honors, including an honorary degree from the University of Göttingen (1937) and fellowships from the Accademia dei Lincei (1927), the Accademia della Crusca (1936) and the Royal Academy of Italy (1942). Even if he initially didn't show support to the Italian Fascist Party, he apparently reduced his anti-fascism through time — or, at least, he made it less evident and explicit; for this reason, in 1946, he was expelled from the Accademia dei Lincei.

=== Death ===
Pasquali died in a car accident in Belluno in 1952. Pasquali had married Maria Nosei in 1921 and the couple remained together until his death. They did not have children.

The Department of Classical Philology of the University of Florence now bears his name.

== Research ==
Pasquali has been described as a child prodigy of Classical philology. He published his first printed works at 21 and, when he completed his critical edition of Proclus' commentary on Plato's Cratylus, he was only 23. He was interested both in the dynamics of textual transmission and literary criticism, and his mentor Nicola Festa encouraged him to work on late ancient or non-canonical authors such as Proclus, Tertullian, Eusebius and Gregory of Nyssa. Festa also introduced him to philology, by making him read the edition of Euripides' Herakles by Wilamowitz.

He worked both on Greek and Latin literatures, mainly from the Hellenistic and Roman age onwards: Horace, Callimachus, Theophrastus, Pausanias and above-mentioned authors Proclus, Tertullian, Eusebius and Gregory of Nyssa. On another hand, he deeply despised Byzantine literature: "la letteratura bizantina è tra le più noiose al mondo" ("Byzantine literature ranks among the most boring [literatures] in the world"); he spoke of "inferiorità del medioevo bizantino rispetto a quello occidentale" ("inferiority of the Byzantine Middle Ages compared to the Western Middle Ages") and of the Byzantines as a "civiltà, diciamo pure inferiore" ("an inferior civilization, let's say").

His written production counts more 500 works.

== Contribution to textual criticism ==
Questo libro è nato da una recensione.

[This book was born out of a review.]

— Storia della tradizione 1952, p. IX

Pasquali's greatest claim to fame is his book Storia della tradizione e critica del testo ("History of tradition and textual criticism"). In 1929, Pasquali was asked to review Textkritik by Paul Maas, for the specialized journal Gnomon. "Against all rules", Pasquali's review came out twice as long as the book it referred to, and he used it to expose some reflections on the nature and methods of textual criticism that went beyond Maas' scopes; Pasquali wrote – rather than a review – an essay on textual criticism that contained, in its core, the principles of historicism and careful attention for the details and events of textual transmission that were going to make Storia della tradizione.

Pasquali's book first came out in 1934 and it was deeply influenced by Eduard Schwartz's critical edition of the Ecclesiastical History by Eusebius. Studying the vaste and complex textual transmission of Eusebius' History, Schwartz had come to the conclusion that several textual variants, which were too large in number and too important to be attributed to "normal" scribal changes, were in fact author's variants survived in the manuscript transmission – Eusebius had evidently revised his own text; moreover, no branch of the transmission is immune from contamination, which makes it impossible to reconstruct the text following Maas' strict mechanical method. According to Maas, contamination was the only obstacle that his own method could not overcome:

Gegen die Kontamination ist noch kein Kraut gewachsen.

[No herb has yet born against contamination.]

— Maas 1950, p. 31

and again in the fourth and last edition:

Gegen die Kontamination ist kein Kraut gewachsen.

[No herb has born against contamination.]

— Maas 1960, p. 30

Yet, Pasquali's historical method was based on four principles desired from Schwartz's studies in Eusebius, which he resumed as follows:

1. Genuine variants can be found even in interpolated manuscripts: this notion anticipates Pasquali's famous motto recentiores, non deteriores (Latin for: "newer, not worse [manuscripts]") which also is the title of Chapter VI of Storia della trasmissione.
2. A text is never transmitted mechanically, rather there are always "new recensions": this is particularly the case for widely-read works – such as, precisely, the classics.
3. The notions of "archetype" and "family trees" (stemma codicum) are both misleading, which Schwartz was even harsher on – he called them "fairytales". This is the only "principle" that Pasquali did not subscribe to, rather arguing that one can, but not must, postulate an archetype.
4. The great majority of errors are not due to letter-swaps.

About the third notion (against the archetype), Pasquali wrote:

Io ritengo esagerate di queste parole solo le prime, che combattono il concetto di archetipo: ogniqualvolta i mss. coincidono in errori non ovvi, è sicuro che un archetipo vi fu; e questo implicitamente ammette anche lo Schwartz, là dove (p. LI) egli dà tracce di un'edizione anteriore in un gruppo ATER (M) ma non induce già che tale gruppo risalga direttamente a un esemplare di questa edizione anteriore, la penultima (ciò che, com’egli dimostra convincentemente, è impossibile), ma invece lo riconduce a un esemplare dell’ultima edizione, nella quale era stato inserito il plus della penultima da una copia di questa che si era salvata. Quest’esemplare è il capostipite del gruppo (secondo la terminologia del Maas, un subarchetipo), quell’ultima edizione è in qualche modo l’archetipo. E sarebbe errato trarre dal numero e dalla qualità delle varianti una presunzione contro l’esistenza di un archetipo. In quale testo compaiono varianti più numerose e più singolari che in Giovenale e in Lucano? E tuttavia l’archetipo è, sia per Giovenale sia per Lucano dimostrato con esattezza matematica. Ma tutto il resto è giusto e importante.

[Of these words, Schwartz exaggerated – I think – only the first ones, fighting the notion of archetype: for every time MSS. coincide in not-obvious errors, an archetype is assured; and this is implicitly admitted by Schwartz himself, where (p. LI) he shows the remains of an antecedent edition survived in MSS ATER (M), yet not deducing that said group traces back to an exemplar of this antecedent edition, the penultimate one (which, as he convincingly shows, is impossible), rather connecting it at an exemplar of the last edition, where the plus of the penultimate copy was included. This exemplar is the progenitor (a sub-archetype, in Maas' terminology), whereas that last edition is an archetype. And it would be greatly wrong, to deduce from the number and the quality of the variants a presumption against the existence of an archetype. For which text bears more variants, and more singular ones, than Juvenal and Lucan? Yet, the archetype is mathematically demonstrated for both Juvenal and Lucan. All the rest, however, is correct and important.]

— Storia della tradizione 1952, pp. 136–137

In general, Pasquali compiled a so-called 'dodecalogue' that resumes his book:

1. The textual transmission of Greek and Latin classics not always originates from a single archetype, be it Medieval or late antique. More often, the various manuscripts derive from late antique editions.
2. The Middle Ages, both in the West and in Byzantium, had much more manuscripts than scholars do think. However, as to the Greek classics, usually a single manuscript arrived in the West from Byzantium; but we have a high number of Latin manuscripts, sometimes in the range of hundreds. Thus it is acceptable to say that the transmission of the Latin classics is less tight than that of the Greek ones.
3. Whence the possibility, more likely for the Latin texts, that more recent manuscripts (recentiores) do derive from different antigrapha than older ones; for this reason, manuscripts are not to be discarded merely on the basis of their date (non deteriores).
4. The same holds true for Humanistic collations and early printed editions.
5. Arbitrary alterations and even falsifications do not automatically disqualify a witness.
6. To believe that the transmission of ancient authors is always mechanical, is prejudicial; it is only occasionally mechanical. The paleographically easiest conjecture is, in texts not-mechanically transmitted, almost never the most probable one.
7. Also prejudicial is to believe that the transmission was always vertical. It often was horizontal, more often in the case of texts widely read.
8. Manuscripts from lateral areas are likely to preserve the correct reading, against those of central areas. This criterion is derived from linguistics.
9. Variant readings can be older than the manuscripts transmitting them, and be traced back to lost ancient editions.
10. Papyri (for Greek authors) and ancient quotations (for Latin authors) do show that every witness represents a different «edition», in ancient times already.
11. There are no known examples of ancient archetypes for the Greek authors, for the Latins the case cannot be excluded.
12. Different redactions of the same work did exist in the ancient times already. This is suggested by the study of the very few autograph papyri and of ancient witnesses, and by the analogies in Medieval works — especially those by Petrarch and Boccaccio — and in selected cases can be proven.

It has been noted that this idea of philology is not 'mathematical' nor 'mechanical' as it would have been had it merely based on Lachmann and Maas; it rather was historical, and historicism was the leading point of Pasquali's studies (he once jokingly said of himself: "io sono fradicio di storicismo" [I am soaked in historicism]). By his review of Maas in 1929, Pasquali had already put his theories to the test in his critical edition of Gregory of Nyssa's epistles, whose textual transmission had the following features:

1. Not all corruptions and variants were mechanical.
2. "Horizontal" contamination was widespread diffused.
3. Consequently, there could not have been a single archetype.
4. The possibility of countering "horizontal" contamination with the criterion which he would later call "of lateral areas".

Pasquali derived the fourth principle from linguistics and it presumes that the same reading preserved in manuscripts coming from different geographical areas, far from each other and not in contact one another, is preferable to a variant coming from a culturally more vibrant area. In order to further prove his theories, Pasquali studied the textual transmission of Tertullian's Apologeticus, concluding that both its versions derived straight from Tertullian himself.

Despite his methodological polemic against Maas (with whom, however, he remained friends until the end of his life – Maas survived Pasquali and died in 1964), Pasquali was enthusiastic of his Textkritik and promoted its translation into Italian. Pasquali's original project was to include, in the translated second edition of Textkritik, also Maas' essay on Schicksale der antiken Literatur in Byzanz [The fate of ancient literature in Byzantium], which was Maas' only historical essay on the transmission of Ancient Greek literature in the Byzantine millennium. However, Maas refused, and suggested in turn that his Schicksale were translated and included into Pasquali's Storia della tradizione, because "every history of tradition is fundamentally excluded [from Textkritik]".

== Works (selection) ==
=== Books ===
- Proclus (1908). Pasquali, G. (ed.). In Platonis Cratylum commentaria. Lipsiae: B. G. Teubner.
- Pasquali, G. (1913). Quaestiones Callimacheae (in Latin). Gottingen: Hubert.
- Pasquali, G. (1920). Orazio lirico. Florence: Le Monnier. ISBN 9780259345381.
- Gregorius Nyssenus (1925). Pasquali, G. (ed.). Epistulae. Berlin: Weidmann.
  - Gregorius Nyssenus (1998). Pasquali, G. (ed.). Epistulae. Gregorii Nysseni Opera, 8/2 (2nd ed.). Leiden – Boston – Köln: E. J. Brill. ISBN 9004111824.
- Pasquali, G. (1952). Storia della tradizione e critica del testo (2nd ed.). Florence: Le Lettere.
- Pasquali, G. (1964). Filologia e storia. Florence: Le Monnier.
- Pasquali, G. (1985). Folena, G. (ed.). Lingua nuova e antica. Bibliotechina del saggiatore, 20. Florence: Le Monnier.
- Pasquali, G. (1986). Bornmann, Fr.; Pascucci, G.; Timpanaro, S. (eds.). Scritti filologici. Vol. I–II. Florence: Leo S. Olschki. ISBN 9788822234674.
- Pasquali, G. (1994). Russo, C. F. (ed.). Pagine stravaganti di un filologo. Vol. I–II. Florence: Le Lettere.
- Pasquali, G. (2013). Romani Mistretta, M. (ed.). Storia dello spirito tedesco nelle memorie d'un contemporaneo. Milan: Adelphi. ISBN 978-88-459-8652-9.
- Pasquali, G. (2021). Di Giglio, A. (ed.). La commedia mitologica e i suoi precedenti nella letteratura greca (Tesi di laurea, 27 giugno 1907). Margaritae, 8. Florence: Accademia Fiorentina di Papirologia e di Studi sul Mondo Antico. ISBN 978-88-945-8808-8.

=== Articles ===
- Pasquali, G. (1906a). "Prolegomena ad Procli commentarium in Cratylum". Studi Italiani di Filologia Classica. 14: 127–152.
- Pasquali, G. (1906b). "Studi recenti sulla commedia attica" (PDF). Atene e Roma. 9 (90–91): 191–194 – via AICC.
- Pasquali, G. (1907). "Parerga". Xenia Romana. Scritti di filologia classica offerti al secondo convegno promosso dall'Associazione italiana per la diffusione e l'incoraggiamento degli studi classici. Rome – Milan: Società Editrice Dante Alighieri. pp. 15–27.
- Pasquali, G.; Levi Della Vida, G. (1907). "De duobus Stati Silvarum locis controversis". Studi Italiani di Filologia Classica. 15: 123–128.
- Pasquali, G. (1908). "Marginalia". Studi Italiani di Filologia Classica. 16: 441–451.
- Pasquali, G. (1909). "Per la delimitazione di un frammento dell'Evemero di Ennio". Rivista di Filologia e di Istruzione Classica. 37: 38–53.
- Pasquali, G. (1910a). "Die Composition der Vita Constantini des Eusebius". Hermes. 45 (3): 369–386. JSTOR 4473240.
- Pasquali, G. (1910b). "Doxographica aus Basiliusscholien". Nachrichten von der Königlichen Gesellschaft der Wissenschaften zu Göttingen — Philologisch-historische Klasse: 194–228.
- Pasquali, G. (1910c). "Ein Neues Fragment des Grammatikers Tryphon". Hermes. 45 (3): 465–467. JSTOR 4473246.
- Pasquali, G. (1911a). "Dar Prooimium des Arat". Χάριτες für Friedrich Leo zum sechzigsten Geburtstag dargebracht. Berlin: Weidmann. pp. 113–122.
- Pasquali, G. (1911b). "Il nuovo frammento della Cydippe di Callimaco e la poesia ellenistica". Atene e Roma. 14: 165–181.
- Pasquali, G. (1913a). "Die Schriftstellerische Form des Pausanias". Hermes. 48 (2): 161–223. JSTOR 4473384.
- Pasquali, G. (1913b). "I due Nicandri". Studi Italiani di Filologia Classica. 20: 55–111.
- Pasquali, G. (1913c). "Οἰκιστήρ". Glotta. 5 (3): 197–202. JSTOR 40264838.
- Pasquali, G. (1915). "Ancora Cirene mitica". Studi Italiani di Filologia Classica. 21: 467–483.
- Pasquali, G. (1919). "Epigrammi callimachei I–II". AAT. 54: 1132–1154.
- Pasquali, G. (1920a). "Il carme 64 di Catullo". Studi Italiani di Filologia Classica. 1 (1): 1–22.
- Pasquali, G. (1920b). "Alceo, fr. 18, 1". Studi Italiani di Filologia Classica. 1 (1): 23–24.
- Pasquali, G. (1920c). "Quantità romanze in Persio?". Studi Italiani di Filologia Classica. 1 (2–3): 297–312.
- Pasquali, G. (1923a). "Il verso 97 delle Rane". Studi Italiani di Filologia Classica. 3 (1): 71–74.
- Pasquali, G. (1923b). "Le lettere di Gregorio di Nissa". Studi Italiani di Filologia Classica. 3 (2): 75–136.
- Pasquali, G. (1923c). "Mimnermo". Studi Italiani di Filologia Classica. 3 (4): 293–303.
- Pasquali, G. (1923d). "I gioielli della madre dei Gracchi". Studi Italiani di Filologia Classica. 3 (4): 335–338.
- Pasquali, G. (1926). "Callimaco, Hymn. III 120 sgg". Studi Italiani di Filologia Classica. 4 (4): 405–407.
- Pasquali, G. (1927). "L'ultimatum spartano ad Atene nell'inverno 431-430". Studi Italiani di Filologia Classica. 5 (4): 299–316.
- Pasquali, G. (1928a). "Versi spuri in c". Studi Italiani di Filologia Classica. 6 (3): 225–229.
- Pasquali, G. (1928b). "Il frammento fiorentino d'Ipponatte". Studi Italiani di Filologia Classica. 6 (4): 301–305.
- Pasquali, G. (1929a). "Per la storia del testo dell'Apologetico di Tertulliano". Studi Italiani di Filologia Classica. 7 (1): 13–58.
- Pasquali, G. (1929b). "Passi difficili dell'Agamennone". Studi Italiani di Filologia Classica. 7 (3–4): 225–234.
- Pasquali, G. (1929c). "Review of Maas 1927 (I)". Gnomon. 5 (8): 417–435. JSTOR 27674036.
- Pasquali, G. (1929d). "Review of Maas 1927 (II)". Gnomon. 5 (9): 498–521. JSTOR 27674057.
- Pasquali, G. (1929e). "Commercianti ateniesi analfabeti?". Studi Italiani di Filologia Classica. 7 (3–4): 243–250.
- Pasquali, G. (1929f). "Leggendo (I–VIII)". Studi Italiani di Filologia Classica. 7 (3–4): 305–323.
- Pasquali, G. (1932a). "Recentiores, non deteriores: collazioni umanistiche ed edizioni critiche (I)". Annali della Scuola Normale Superiore di Pisa. Lettere, Storia e Filosofia. 1 (1): 53–84. JSTOR 24298362.
- Pasquali, G. (1932b). "Recentiores, non deteriores: collazioni umanistiche ed edizioni critiche (II)". Annali della Scuola Normale Superiore di Pisa. Lettere, Storia e Filosofia. 1 (2): 105–129. JSTOR 24298362.
- Pasquali, G. (1948). "Congettura e probabilità diplomatica". Annali della Scuola Normale Superiore di Pisa. Lettere, Storia e Filosofia. 17 (3/4): 220–223. JSTOR 24299270.

== Bibliography ==
- Bossina, L. (2022). "Giorgio Pasquali and Philology as a Historical Science". History of Classical Philology. Trends in Classics — Scholarship in the Making, 2. Berlin – New York: De Gruyter. pp. 239–275. doi:10.1515/9783110730388-011. hdl:11577/3439430. ISBN 9783110730388.
- Canfora, L. (2025). "Giorgio Pasquali". Database of Classical Scholars. New Brunswick: Rutgers, The University of New Jersey.
- Degani, E. (1988). "Gli studi di greco". In Bornmann, Fr. (ed.). Giorgio Pasquali e la filologia classica del Novecento. Atti del Convegno (Firenze-Pisa, 2-3 dicembre 1985). Biblioteca dell'«Archivum Romanicum». Serie I: Storia, Letteratura, Paleografia, 218. Florence: Olschki. pp. 203–266. ISBN 978-88-222-3616-6.
- Euripides (1889). Wilamowitz-Moellendorff, U. von (ed.). Herakles. Vol. I–II. Berlin: Weidmann.
- Eusebius (1903–1909). Schwartz, E.; Mommsen, T. (eds.). Kirchengeschichte. Die griechischen christlichen Schriftsteller der ersten drei Jahrhunderte, 9. Vol. I–III. Berlin: Akademie-Verlag.
- Grassi, E. (1956). "Bibliografia di Giorgio Pasquali". SIFC². 27–28: vii–xxxi.
- Grassi, E.; Timpanaro, S. (1972). "Bibliografia di Pasquali". In Caretti, L. (ed.). Per Giorgio Pasquali. Studi e testimonianze. Pisa: Nistri-Lischi. pp. 149–183. ISBN 9788883810084.
- La Penna, Antonio (2014). "Pasquali, Giorgio". Dizionario Biografico degli Italiani. Vol. LXXXI. Rome: Istituto della Enciclopedia.
- Maas, P. (1927). Textkritik. Einleitung in die Altertumswissenschaft, 1.2. Leipzig: Teubner.
- Maas, P. (1937). "Leitfehler und stemmatische Typen". BZ. 37 (2): 289–294. doi:10.1515/byzs.1937.37.2.289.
- Maas, P. (1950). Textkritik (2nd ed.). Leipzig: Teubner.
  - Maas, P. (1952). Critica del testo. Translated by Martinelli, N. Foreword by G. Pasquali. Florence: Le Monnier.
- Maas, P. (1960). Textkritik (4th ed.). Leipzig: Teubner.
- Pascucci, Giovanni (1978). "Lettere giovanili di Giorgio Pasquali". Atene e Roma. 23: 23–37.
- Pieraccioni, Dino (1985). "Giorgio Pasquali sotto concorso". Belfagor. 40 (3): 315–327. JSTOR 26145416.
- Russo, C. F. (1984). "Ich, Giorgio Federico Guglielmo Ercole Francesco: Curriculum vitae". Belfagor. 39 (6): 686–689. JSTOR 26145503.
- Timpanaro, S. (1973). "Giorgio Pasquali". Belfagor. 28 (2): 183–205. JSTOR 26142556.
- Giorgio Pasquali e la filologia classica del Novecento: atti del Convegno (Firenze-Pisa, 2-3 dicembre 1985), Florence, Olschki, 1988.
