= Eduard Schwartz =

German classical philologist (1858–1940)

Eduard Schwartz (22 August 1858 – 13 February 1940) was a German classical philologist.

Born in Kiel, he studied under Hermann Sauppe at the University of Göttingen, under Hermann Usener and Franz Bücheler at the University of Bonn, under Theodor Mommsen at the Friedrich Wilhelm University of Berlin and under Ulrich von Wilamowitz-Moellendorff at the University of Greifswald. In 1880, he obtained his doctorate from the University of Bonn.

In 1884, he became a lecturer in Bonn, afterwards being appointed professor of classical philology at the University of Rostock (1887). This was followed by professorships at the University of Giessen (1893), the University of Strasbourg (1897), the University of Göttingen (1902) and the University of Freiburg (1909). In 1914, he returned to the University of Strasbourg, where he served as university rector in 1915 and 1916. In 1919, he was a successor to Otto Crusius at the Ludwig-Maximilians-Universität München.

He published numerous articles and works in the area of Greek and Roman history, including on the Catilinarian conspiracy. His magnum opus was a publication of the acts of oecumenical councils (ACO) from Ephesus (431) onwards. He also started the edition of Eusebius' works in the GCS series, editing the Ecclesiastical History with the facing edition of Rufinus' translation by Theodor Mommsen, and the ancient and Byzantine scholia to Euripides' tragedies.

A friend of the Italian philologist Giorgio Pasquali (met in Göttingen in 1909), Schwartz asserted that the ecclesiastical history was part of the material history of humankind, and therefore he opposed to the number of ecclesiastical history teachings which were arisen within German universities.

Schwartz died in Munich in 1940.

== Bibliography ==
- "De Dionysio Scytobrachione", (dissertation), Bonn 1880.
- "Scholia in Euripidem", critical edition (volumes 1–2), Berlin 1887
- "Quaestiones Herodotae", 1890.
- Christliche und jüdische Ostertafeln (1905) (Online)
- " Acta conciliorum oecumenicorum" (The Acts of the Ecumenical Councils) Berlin & Leipzig, 1914–1940.
  - Tome 1: Concilium Universale Ephesenum (AD 431)
  - Tome 2: Concilium Universale Chalcedonense (AD 451)
  - Tome 3: Collectio Sabbaitica contra Acephalos et Origenistas destinata (AD 536)
  - Tome 4: Concilium Universale Constantinopolitanum sub Iustiniano habitum (AD 553).
- Zur Entstehung der Ilias (On the origin of the Iliad), Strasbourg 1918.
- Das Geschichtswerk des Thukydides, (The historical works of Thucydides), Bonn 1919, second edition 1929.
- "Codex Vaticanus Gr. 1431, Eine Antichalkedonische Sammlung Aus Der Zeit Kaiser Zenos", etc. [Selections from the Contents of the Codex, including letters from and to Saint Cyril, Patriarch of Alexandria. With Introduction and Notes by E. Schwartz, 1927].
