= Ulrich von Wilamowitz-Moellendorff =

German classical philologist (1848–1931)

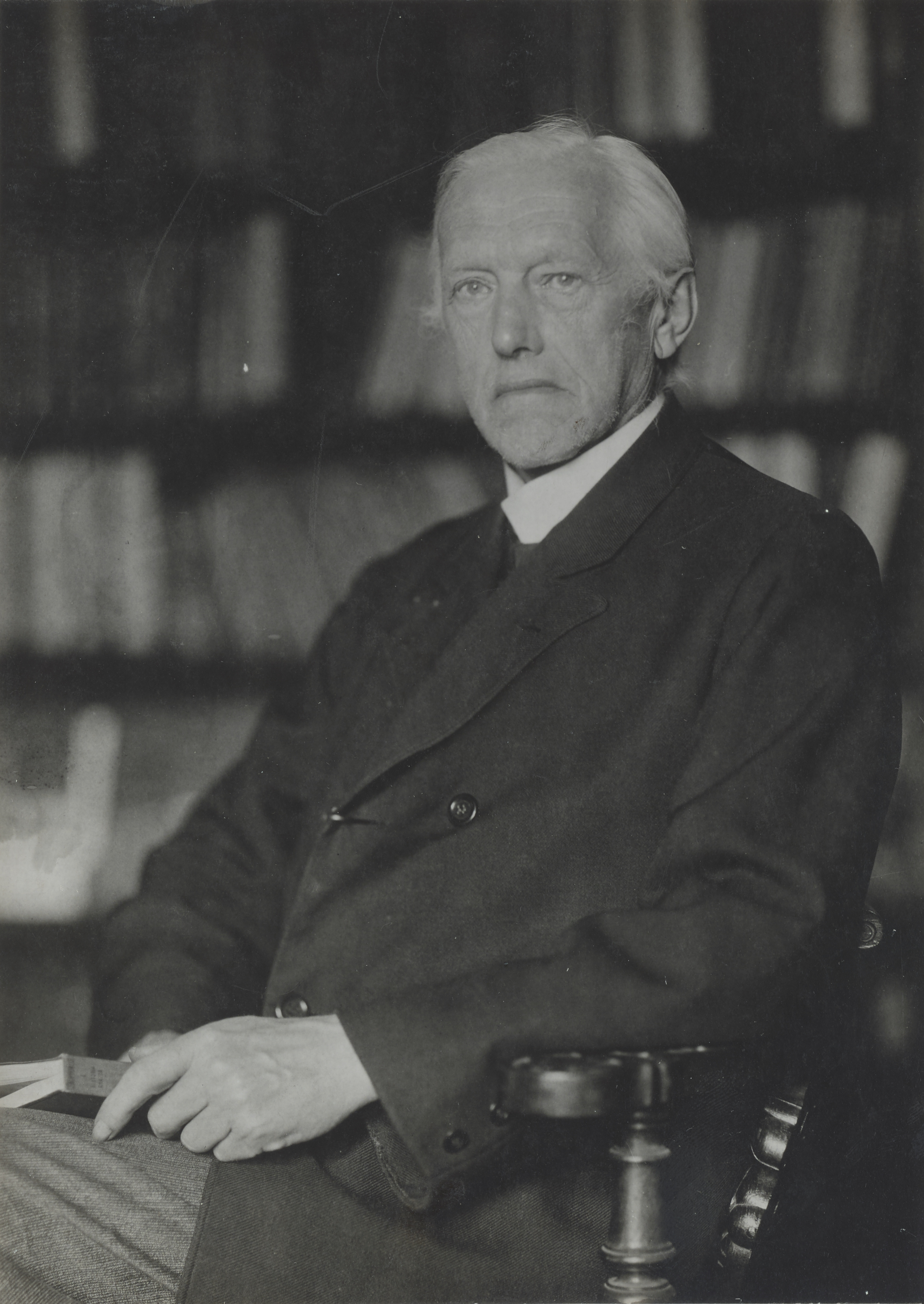
- Born: Enno Friedrich Wichard Ulrich von Wilamowitz-Moellendorff; 22 December 1848; Markowice, Province of Posen, Prussia
- Died: 25 September 1931 (aged 82); Berlin, Germany
- Education: Schulpforta; University of Bonn
- Scientific career
- Fields: Classical philology
- Doctoral advisor: Moriz Haupt
- Other academic advisors: Otto Jahn, Anton Springer, Hermann Usener
- Doctoral students: Paul Friedländer, Walther Kranz, Karl Reinhardt
- Other notable students: Pere Bosch i Gimpera, Harold F. Cherniss, Eduard Fraenkel, Hermann Fränkel, Felix Jacoby, Werner Jaeger, Ove Jørgensen, Paul Maas, Spyridon Marinatos, Gilbert Murray, Giorgio Pasquali, Wolfgang Schadewaldt, Eduard Schwartz, Carl Robert, Hans von Arnim

Enno Friedrich Wichard Ulrich von Wilamowitz-Moellendorff (22 December 1848 – 25 September 1931) was a German classical philologist. Wilamowitz, as he is known in scholarly circles, was a renowned authority on Ancient Greece and its literature.

== Life ==
=== Youth ===
Wilamowitz-Moellendorff was born in Markowitz (Markowice), a small village near Hohensalza (Inowrocław), in the then Province of Posen (now part of the Kuyavian-Pomeranian Voivodeship), to a Germanized family of distant Polish ancestry. His father, a Prussian Junker, was Arnold Wilamowitz, of Szlachta origin and using the Ogończyk coat of arms, while his mother was Ulrika, née Calbo. The couple settled in a small manor confiscated from a local noble in 1836. The Prussian part of their name, von Moellendorf, was acquired in 1813 when Prussian field marshal Wichard Joachim Heinrich von Möllendorf adopted Ulrich's ancestors. Wilamowitz, a third child, grew up in East Prussia.

In 1867 Wilamowitz passed his Abitur at the renowned boarding school at Schulpforta. Here he was educated and learned, amongst the rest, the English language, also studying privately with Dietrich Volkmann, teacher and then Master of the school.

=== Studies ===
Until 1869, he studied Classical Philology at the University of Bonn. His teachers, Otto Jahn and Hermann Usener, had a formative influence on him. Willamowitz's relationship with Usener was strained. He developed a lifelong rivalry with his fellow student Friedrich Nietzsche and a close friendship with his contemporary Hermann Diels.

Together with Diels, he moved to Berlin in 1869, where he graduated as a Doctor of Philosophy cum laude in 1870. After voluntary service in the Franco-Prussian War, he embarked on a study tour to Italy and Greece.

=== Conflict with Nietzsche and Wagner ===
Even before he gained a professorial title, Wilamowitz was a member of a scholarly dispute about Nietzsche's Birth of Tragedy that attracted much attention. In 1872–73, he published two unusually aggressive polemics (German: "Zukunftsphilologie", i.e. "Philology of the future"), which strongly attacked Nietzsche (then Professor at the University of Basel) and Professor Erwin Rohde (University of Kiel). Richard Wagner, whose views on art had influenced Nietzsche and Rohde, reacted by publishing an open letter and Rohde wrote a damning response. The issue at stake was the deprecation of Euripides, on whom Nietzsche blamed the destruction of Greek tragedy. Wilamowitz saw the methods of his adversaries as an attack on the basic tenets of scientific thought, unmasking them as enemies of the scientific method. His polemic was considered as Classical philology's reply to Nietzsche's challenge.

At the age of 80 when Wilamowitz wrote his memoirs, he saw the conflict with Nietzsche less passionately but did not retract the essential points of his critique. He stated that he had not fully realised at the time that Nietzsche was not interested in scientific understanding but rather in Wagner's musical drama, but also that he was nevertheless right to take his position against Nietzsche's "rape of historical facts and all historical method".

=== Greifswald ===
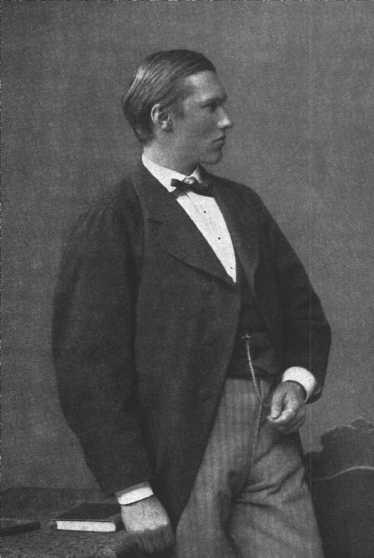
Wilamowitz in Greifswald (1878)

In 1875, he gained a professorial title for his study Analecta Euripidea. In the same year, he gave his first public academic lecture in Berlin. In 1876, he was employed as Ordinarius (full professor) for Classical Philology at Ernst-Moritz-Arndt-Universität at Greifswald. During this period, he also married Marie Mommsen, the eldest daughter of Theodor Mommsen, and published Homeric Studies (Homerische Studien).

=== Göttingen ===
In 1883, he took a further professorial position at Georg-August-Universität in Göttingen. Here, he continued to teach Classical Philology but also gave replacement lectures in Ancient History. His influence ensured the employment of his Greifswald colleague, Julius Wellhausen, in Göttingen. In 1891, he became vice-chancellor of the university, and he was appointed a member of Göttingen's Royal Academy of Sciences one year later. When Wilamowitz left Göttingen, he was succeeded by Georg Kaibel, a close associate from his student days and his successor at Greifswald.

=== Berlin ===
In 1897, with the support of his friend Diels, Wilamowitz was offered a position at the Royal Friedrich-Wilhelms-Universität at Berlin, as successor to Ernst Curtius. He stayed until his retirement in 1921. In 1915, he was appointed chancellor of the university for one year. Together with Diels, he founded the Berlin Institute for Ancient Studies (Institut für Altertumskunde) in 1897. His public lectures on subjects of Classical antiquity, which took place twice a week, attracted large audiences.

=== Teaching activities and memberships ===
In 1891, Wilamowitz was elected a corresponding member of the Prussian Academy of Sciences and he was a full member from 1899. In 1902 he took the academy's presidency. As a member of the Göttingen Academy, he strongly encouraged the publication of the Thesaurus Linguae Latinae. From 1897 he also worked as a member of the academy's Commission for Patristics. In 1894 he was elected full member of the German Archaeological Institute. He also was editor of the series Philologische Untersuchungen from 1880 to 1925.

Further, Wilamowitz taught as a guest lecturer in Oxford (1908) and Uppsala (1912), was a corresponding member of the Norwegian Academy of Science and Letters (1909) and the Scientific Society of Lund (1921).

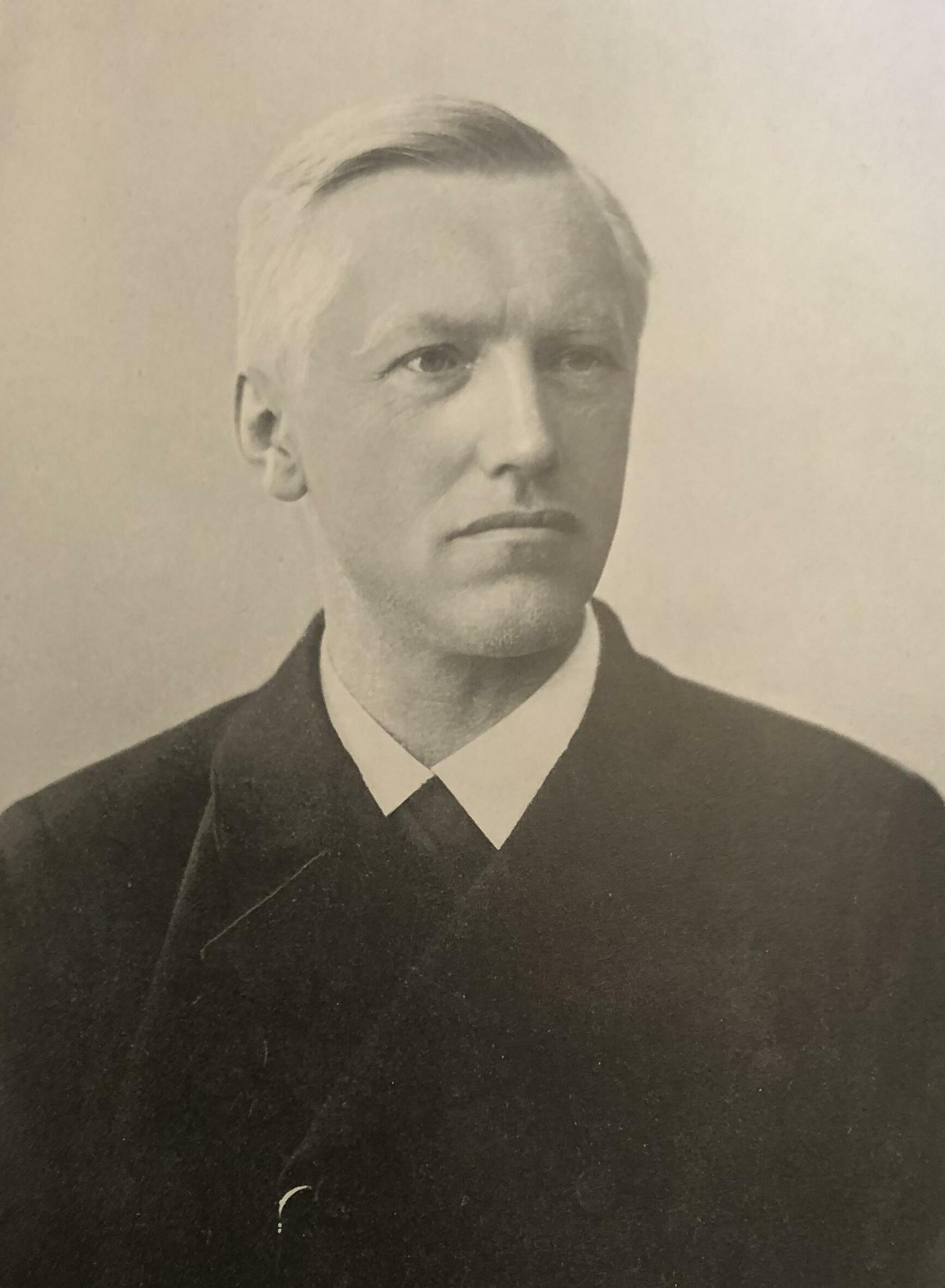
Wilamowitz (around 1908 )

=== Inscriptiones Graecae ===
During his presidency of the Prussian Academy, Wilamowitz oversaw the continuation of August Böckh's and Adolf Kirchhoff's publication series, the Inscriptiones Graecae. Wilamowitz had a formative influence on the further development of that project, which he directed until his death.

=== World War I ===
Wilamowitz was an initiator of the memorandum Erklärung der Hochschullehrer des Deutschen Reiches ("Declaration by the University Teachers of the German Reich"), in which 3,016 signatories supported German participation in the First World War. Shortly after, he also signed the Manifesto of the Ninety-Three, from which he distanced himself later. In 1914, his son, Tycho von Wilamowitz-Moellendorff, who was also active as a classical philologist, fell in the battle of Ivangorod. The memorandum appeared a few days later.

=== Family ===
In 1878, he married Maria Mommsen, the eldest daughter of the famous ancient historian, Theodor Mommsen, whom he actively assisted in the completion of his Roman History.

Wilamowitz spent his last years in seclusion, suffering from severe kidney problems. He died in Berlin on 25 September 1931, having been in a coma for a short time. He is buried in his native village, along with his wife, Maria (1855–1936), and their only son, Tycho. He also had a daughter, Dorothea Freifrau Hiller von Gaertringen, wife of archaeologist Friedrich Hiller von Gaertringen, who died on 24 March 1972.

== Achievements ==
Wilamowitz is one of the central figures of 19th and 20th century Classical philology. As a great authority on the literature and history of Ancient Greece, Wilamowitz took a stance against traditional methodology and textual criticism. As a representative of Postclassicism, he concentrated less on literary history but rather aimed to extract biographical information on the respective authors from the preserved texts. Thus, he employed historical perspectives to serve philology.

Apart from his seminal general works (Greek Literature from Antiquity, Hellenistic Poetry), he published numerous detailed studies of Euripides, Homer, Aeschylus, Pindar and Aristotle. As a scientific organiser, he was also responsible for the publication of important standard-setting source material publications, such as Inscriptiones Graecae.

He also passionately supported the preservation of Classical education in the German school system.

Notable pupils of his include Felix Jacoby, Karl Mittelhaus, Wolfgang Schadewaldt, Eduard Fraenkel, Werner Jaeger, Johannes Geffcken, Paul Maas, Eduard Schwartz, Gilbert Murray, Paul Friedländer, Friedrich Solmsen and Johannes Sykutris.

In recent decades, the American scholar William M. Calder III has been publishing a series of important documents about and by Wilamowitz, including much of his correspondence with Diels, Eduard Norden, Mommsen, Paul Wendland, and others.

== Honours and awards ==
- 1910 Honorary doctorate in Theology at the University of Berlin
- 1911 Honorary doctorate, Oslo University

=== Orders and decorations ===
- Germany:
  - Kingdom of Prussia:
    - Knight's Cross of the Royal House Order of Hohenzollern, 1886
    - Knight of the Order of the Red Eagle, 3rd Class with Bow, 18 January 1893; 2nd Class, 1904
    - Pour le Mérite for Arts and Sciences, 5 August 1908
  - Kingdom of Bavaria: Bavarian Maximilian Order for Science and Art, 1905
  - Weimar Republic: Adlerschild des Deutschen Reiches, 1928
- Austria-Hungary: Decoration of Honour of Arts and Sciences, 1913

== Works ==
- Griechische Literatur des Altertums
- Einleitung in die griechische Tragödie (1907)
- Homerische Untersuchungen (1884)
- Die Ilias und Homer (1916)
- Platon (vollständig in 2 Bänden) (1919)
- Hellenistische Dichtung (1924)
- Der Glaube der Hellenen (1931-32)
- Erinnerungen 1848–1914. Verlag von K. F. Koehler, Leipzig 1928. (Memoirs)

== Sources ==
- Michael Armstrong, Wolfgang Buchwald, William M. Calder III.: Ulrich von Wilamowitz-Moellendorff bibliography 1867–1990 (Hildesheim, Weidmann, 1991).
- Braun, Maximilian, William M. Calder, III & Dietrich Ehlers, eds., "Lieber Prinz". Der Briefwechsel zwischen Hermann Diels und Ulrich von Wilamowitz-Moellendorff (1869–1921) (Hildesheim: Weidmann, 1995).
- Calder, William M. III and Bernhard Huss, eds., 'The Wilamowitz in Me': 100 Letters between Ulrich von Wilamovitz-Moellendorff and Paul Friedlaender (1904–1931) (Los Angeles: Charles Young Research Library, University of California, 1999).
- Candio, Antonella, "Ein lebendiges Ganzes": la filologia come scienza e storia nelle "Coefore" di Ulrich von Wilamowitz-Moellendorff (Amsterdam: Adolf M. Hakkert, 2008) (Supplementi di Lexis, 57).
- Norton, Robert E., "Wilamowitz at War", International Journal of the Classical Tradition, 15/1, (2008), pp. 74–97.
