= Hans Lietzmann =

German theologian and historian (1875–1942)

- Born: March 2, 1875; Düsseldorf, Germany
- Died: June 25, 1942 (aged 67); Locarno, Switzerland

Academic background
- Education: University of Jena; University of Bonn

Academic work
- Discipline: Church history, New Testament studies.
- Institutions: University of Jena; University of Berlin

Hans Lietzmann (2 March 1875 – 25 June 1942) was a German Protestant theologian and church historian who was a native of Düsseldorf.

He initially studied in Jena, then continued his education in Bonn, where he was a student of Hermann Usener. In 1905 he was appointed professor of church history at the University of Jena, and in 1923 was a successor to Adolf von Harnack at the University of Berlin. During his career he obtained an honorary doctorate from the University of Athens, and in 1927 became a member of the Prussian Academy of Sciences. He died in Locarno, Switzerland on 25 June 1942.

Largely known for his work as a church historian and for his research of the New Testament, Lietzmann was also an authority in the fields of archaeology, classical philology and papyrology.

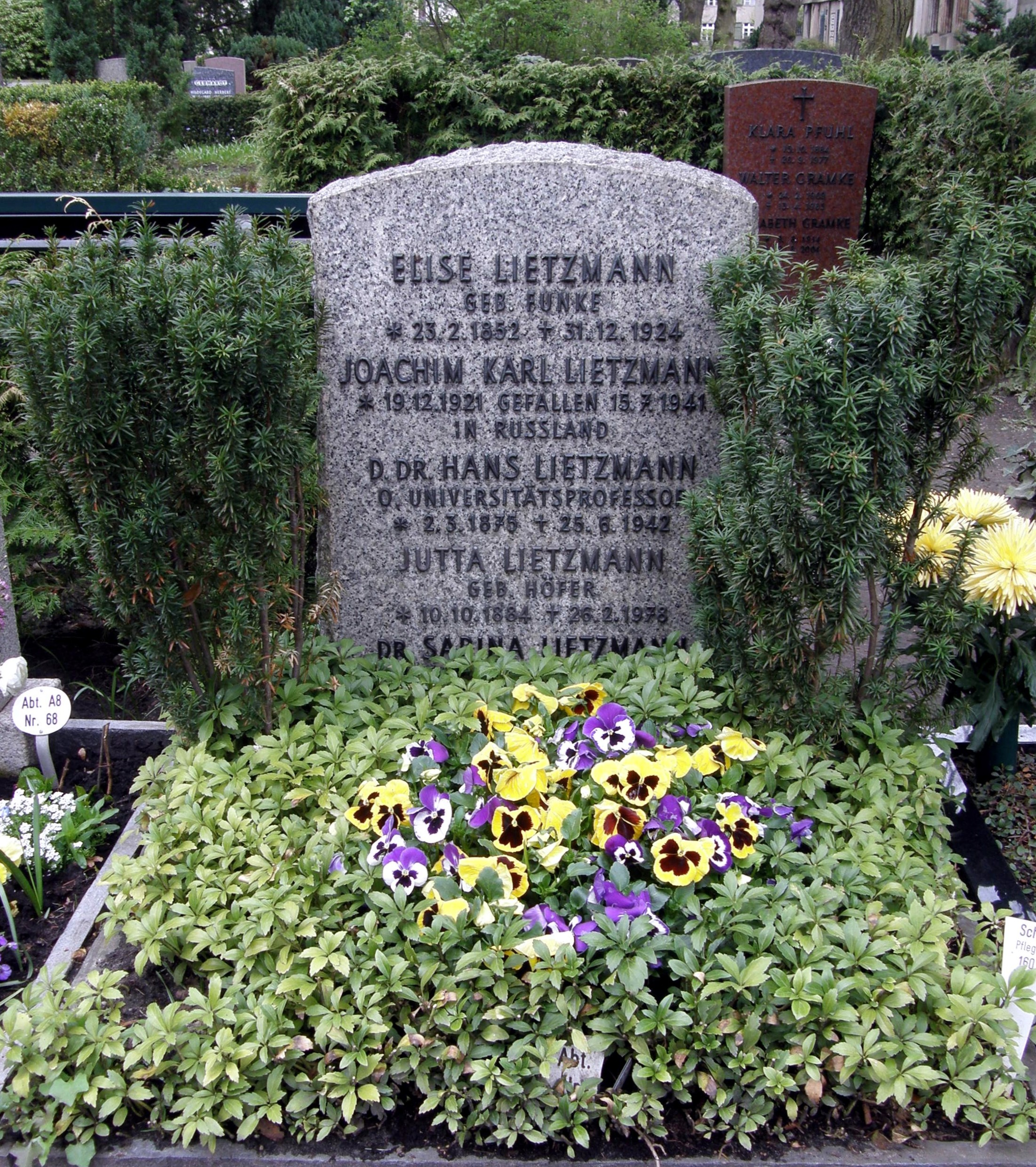
Grave of Lietzmann at the Friedhof Wilmersdorf in Berlin

== Selected publications ==
Lietzmann was the author of the four volume Geschichte der Alten Kirche (History of the Early Church) and Messe und Herrenmahl (Mass and Lord's Supper); both works later being translated and published in English. Other significant books by Lietzmann include:

- Das Muratorische Fragment und die Monarchianischen Prologe zu den Evangelien (The Muratorian fragment and the Monarchian Prologues to the Gospels) (Bonn 1902).
- Symbole der Alten Kirche (Symbols of the Early Church) ("Kleine Texte für Vorlesungen und Übungen" 17/18; 6th edition, Berlin 1968).
- Petrus und Paulus in Rom: Liturgische und archäologische Studien (Peter and Paul in Rome: Liturgical and Archaeological Studies), 2nd, revised edition (Bonn 1927).
- An die Korinther I/II (First and Second Corinthians), 5th, expanded edition ("Handbuch zum Neuen Testament 9"; Tübingen 1949).
