= Hermann Usener =

German classical philologist (1834–1905)

Hermann Karl Usener
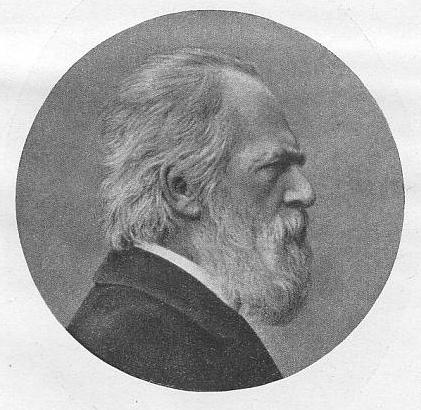
- Born: Hermann Karl Usener; 23 October 1834; Weilburg, Nassau, Germany
- Died: 21 October 1905 (aged 70); Bonn, Prussia, Germany
- Education: Heidelberg University; Ludwig-Maximilians-Universität München; University of Göttingen; University of Bonn
- Scientific career
- Fields: Classics
- Workplaces: University of Bern; University of Greifswald; University of Bonn
- Doctoral advisor: Friedrich Wilhelm Ritschl
- Doctoral students: H. A. Diels; Hermann Osthoff; U. von Wilamowitz-Moellendorff
- Other notable students: Albrecht Dieterich; Friedrich Leo; Hans Lietzmann; Paul Natorp; Richard Reitzenstein; Eduard Schwartz; Aby Warburg

Hermann Karl Usener (German: [ˈuːzənɐ]; 23 October 1834 – 21 October 1905) was a German scholar in the fields of philology and comparative religion.

== Life ==
Hermann Usener was born at Weilburg and educated at its Gymnasium. From 1853, he studied at Heidelberg University, the Ludwig-Maximilians-Universität München, the University of Göttingen, and the University of Bonn.

In 1858, he had a teaching position at the Joachimsthalschen Gymnasium in Berlin. He was Professor from 1861 to 1863 at the University of Bern, then at the University of Greifswald, before becoming professor at the University of Bonn.

The Bonn School of classical philology was led by Usener with Franz Buecheler.

== Influence ==
Usener was a large-scale thinker who combined scholarly research with theoretical reflection. His research on the ancient world used a comparative method, drawing on a variety of ethnological material for the study of social and religious matters. His theoretical method was phenomenological or hermeneutical, and centred on social psychology and cultural history. He was influential most of all through his work on the formation of religious concepts, which influenced thinkers such as Albrecht Dieterich, Ludwig Radermacher, Aby Warburg, Walter F. Otto, and Ernst Cassirer. In his book “The Names of Gods” (Götternamen, 1896), Usener introduced the concept of a momentary god. This phrase entered the English-speaking world, to describe deities who seem to exist only for a specific purpose, time and place.

He also trained an impressive list of students, and belonged to a long dynasty of students of Winckelmann. One such student was Friedrich Nietzsche: after initial support, Usener turned against him as a scholar after reading The Birth of Tragedy. Other students included Hermann Diels, Paul Natorp, Hans Lietzmann, Albrecht Dieterich, Richard Reitzenstein, and Aby Warburg. Ulrich von Wilamowitz-Moellendorff, the leading German classical scholar of the following generation, studied at Bonn 1867-9; but tended to disagree with Usener. Their correspondence has been published.

== Family ==
Hermann Usener's parents were Georg Friedrich Usener (20 August 1789–15 April 1854), Landesoberschultheiß in the Amt of Weilburg and his wife Charlotte Henriette Caroline Vogler (1798–1855), daughter of Georg Vogler, a physician and member of the Princedom of Nassau's medical council. On 4 September 1866, Usener married Caroline (Lily) Dilthey in Marburg (25 February 1846–14 March 1920). She was the sister of the philosopher Wilhelm Dilthey and the archaeologist Karl Dilthey. In 1899, his daughter married the classical philologist Albrecht Dieterich. Usener's son, Karl Albert Hermann (1876–1928) was an Oberleutnant.

== Works ==
- Analecta Theophrastea (1858 dissertation at Bonn)
- Alexandri Aphrodisiensis problematorum lib. III. et IV. (1859)
- Scholia in Lucani bellum civile (1869)
- Anecdoton Holderi (1877)
- Legenden der heiligen Pelagia (1879)
- De Stephano Alexandrino (1880)
- Philologie und Geschichtswissenschaft (1882)
- Jacob Bernays, Gesammelte Abhandlungen (1885) editor
- Acta S. Marinae et S. Christophori (1886)
- Epicurea (1887)
- Altgriechischer Versbau (1887)
- Das Weihnachtsfest (Religionsgeschichtliche Untersuchungen, part 1) (1889)
- Christlicher Festbrauch (Religionsgeschichtliche Untersuchungen, part 2) (1889)
- Die Sintfluthsagen untersucht (1899)
- Götternamen: Versuch einer Lehre von der Religiösen Begriffsbildung (1896)
- Dionysius of Halicarnassus edition, begun 1904, with Ludwig Radermacher
- Vorträge und Aufsätze, 1907.

== Sources ==
- Roland Kany, Hermann Usener as Historian of Religion. In: Archiv für Religionsgeschichte 6 (2004) S. 159-176.
