= First Camp =

Swedish camping and resort company

- Company type: Private
- Industry: Hospitality and tourism
- Founded: 2002
- Headquarters: Gothenburg, Sweden
- Area served: Sweden, Denmark, Norway, Finland, Germany and Switzerland
- Key people: Johan Söör (CEO)

First Camp is a Swedish camping and resort company headquartered in Gothenburg, Sweden. Founded in 2002, the company operates camping destinations, holiday resorts and accommodation facilities across Northern Europe.

The company has expanded through acquisitions and mergers and operates destinations in Sweden, Denmark, Norway, Finland, Germany and Switzerland.

== History ==
First Camp was founded in 2002 as Sweden's first nationwide private camping chain.

The company expanded through acquisitions during the 2000s and 2010s. In 2019, Nordic Camping & Resort acquired First Camp, and the combined business continued under the First Camp brand.

During the 2020s, First Camp expanded further across the Nordic region through acquisitions and organic growth. The company subsequently entered Finland, Germany and Switzerland through acquisitions of camping and holiday resort operators.

== Operations ==
First Camp operates camping destinations, holiday resorts and accommodation facilities across Northern Europe.

The company offers pitches for caravans, motorhomes and tents, as well as cabins, glamping accommodation and resort facilities.

According to the company's 2024 annual report, the group operates more than 90 destinations and serves guests across six European countries.

First Camp has been cited in Swedish business and tourism media in connection with trends in domestic tourism, camping and motorhome travel.
