= Giuseppe Chirichiello =

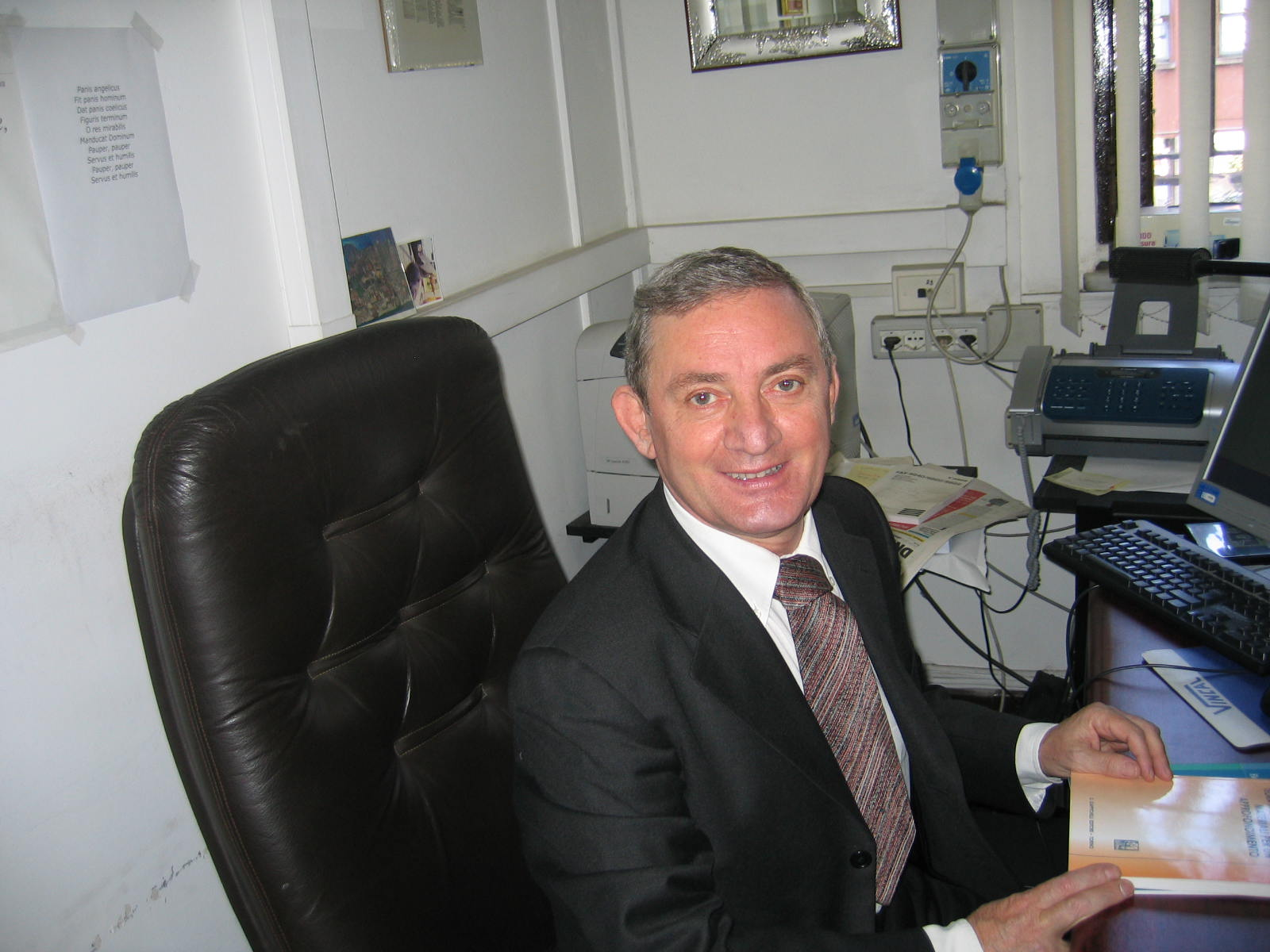
- Born: 29 October 1948 (age 77)

Academic background
- Influences: Manlio Resta; Mario Arcelli

Giuseppe Chirichiello (born 29 October 1948) is an Italian economist and professor at the Sapienza Università di Roma (SUR).

He studied at the SUR, and obtained a laurea in Economics and Commerce at Facoltà di Economia e Commercio (Sapienza University of Rome, Italy) in 1971 (under the supervision of Manlio Resta and Fausto Vicarelli). He is currently Chairman of the Institute of Economic and Finance at the Faculty of Law at the SUR. He is Chairman of Nucleo di Valutazione of Law’s Faculty at the SUR. He is Executive Dean for the structures Faculty of Law at SUR.

He is auditor of scientific projects PRIN at the Italian Ministry of Scientific Research. He is a member of GI an Inspection Group of the University.

He is a member of the scientific committees (SC) of PhD "Dottorato di ricerca in diritto commerciale e dell'economia – Facoltà di Giurisprudenza"(Commercial Law and Economics), of the SC of the Master di Scienze della Sicurezza ambientale (Science of Environmental Security), of the SC of the Master di Diritto privato europeo (European Private Law).

In 1972, he was awarded the 1971 Prize “Cassa di Risparmio di Roma" as the best Economics' Dissertation in the Academic Year 1971.

He has been a member of the board of the department DSG at Faculty of Law at SUR from 2003 to 2006. He has been member of various national P&T commissions for lecturer, associate professor, and full professor during the period 1986 to 2008. He has been a member of the Scientific Committee and of the Board of the formerly Center of Experimental Economics at LUISS University, Rome, for the years 1989 to 1996.

He has been a member of the Scientific Committee, and coordinator of the section for Monetary Theory and responsible of the CNR Research "Foundations of Monetary Theory and the Monetary Policy in both Rational Expectations and Disequilibrium models" at O.C.S.M, LUISS University of Rome (, for the years 1989–1996.
