= Landesoberschultheiß =

The Landesoberschultheiß ('Territorial Super Mayor') was an official in the Duchy of Nassau.

A Landesoberschultheiß was appointed in each Amt as a subordinate of the Amtmann. His role was overseeing legal cases falling under voluntary jurisdiction in each Amt. This included things like inheritance matters and certification. He was an arbitrator and responsible for orphans' care. He framed contracts of purchase or exchange of immobile property, was responsible for mortgages and presided over public auctions. The legal framework for the office was laid down in section 9 of the Ducal Edict of 4 June 1816. The position of Landesoberschultheiß existed in Nassau before the establishment of the Duchy of Nassau.

== Bibliography ==
- Norbert Zabel: Räumliche Behördenorganisation im Herzogtum Nassau (1806–1866), 1981, ISBN 9783922244394, p. 64.
