= Epigrammata Bobiensia =

Latin manuscript

Epigrammata Bobiensia is a collection of texts including epigrams and poems. The original manuscript was found in the library of Bobbio Abbey in 1493, but was lost. A copy was discovered in the Vatican Library by Augusto Campana in the mid-20th century, and published by Franco Munari. The collection includes 70 epigrams mostly dating from around 400 AD, and 71 poems, one of which is attributed to Sulpicia, though since the late 19th century most (though not all) scholars have considered it a forgery contemporary with the rest of the collection. The most represented author is Junius Naucellius.

== Bibliography ==
- Speyer, Wolfgang (2008). Brill's New Pauly. Brill. ISBN 9789004122598.
- Nocchi, Francesca Romana (2016). Commento agli "Epigrammata Bobiensia". de Gruyter. ISBN 9783110466270.
