= Operation Regenbogen =

Operation Regenbogen may refer to:

- In 1942 Operation Regenbogen (Arctic) was an unsuccessful sortie against Arctic convoy JW 51B, which led to the Battle of the Barents Sea
- In 1945 Operation Regenbogen (U-boat) was the codename for the plan by Admiral Karl Dönitz to scuttle Kriegsmarine warships, particularly U-boats, at the end of the war
