= Eduard Norden =

German classical philologist and historian (1868–1941)

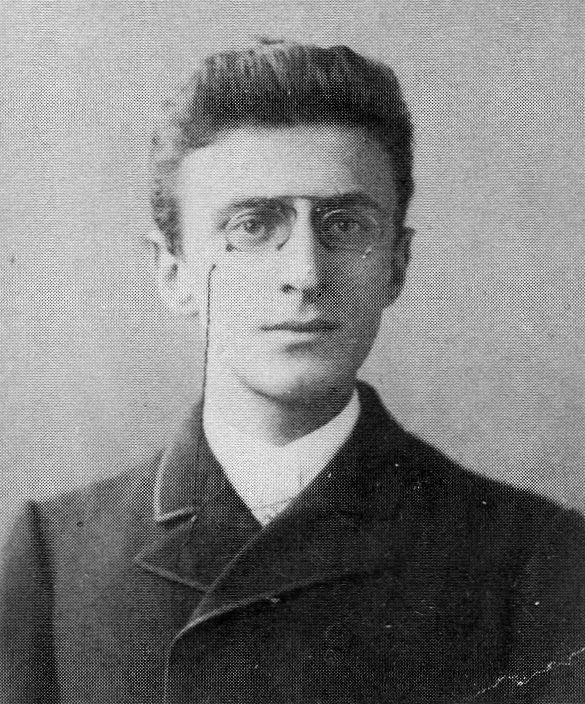
Eduard Norden as student in Berlin (1888)

Eduard Norden (21 September 1868 – 13 July 1941) was a German classical philologist and historian of religion. When Norden received an honorary doctorate from Harvard, James Bryant Conant referred to him as "the most famous Latinist in the world".

== Life ==
Eduard Norden was born in Emden in East Frisia, the son of a Jewish physician. Baptized in the Evangelical Church aged 17, he studied classics at Bonn and Berlin. After serving as assistant at Strassburg, in 1893 he became professor at Greifswald. In Greiswald he married Marie Schultze, the daughter of the city's mayor. After having published Die Antike Kunstprosa in 1899 he was appointed to the University of Breslau. The book on Vergil's Aeneid (1903) made him famous. At age 38 he was appointed to the chair of Latin in Berlin, the most prestigious position for a classicist in Germany. In 1928, at age 60, he was appointed rector of the University of Berlin.

During winter 1934/35 a new law in Germany set the age for retirement from professorship from before 68 to 65. Because Norden had already by 1933 reached the age of 65, he was given emeritus status in February 1935. Because of the antisemitic Nuremberg Laws of 1935 already in December 1935 Norden lost the right to hold lectures at the University of Berlin. Reacting to pressure by the Ministry of Education in 1938 the Berlin Academy of Science urged Norden to quit his membership there. The 1938 Jewish tax forced him to sell his house and portions of his library, and he lost his right to use university facilities. Friends persuaded him to move to Zurich, where he died on 13 July 1941.

Norden described Hermann Usener (1834–1905) und Franz Bücheler (1837–1908) as his most important teachers.

Today the best known of Norden's scientific works is Antike Kunstprosa (1898), which centers on problems of rhetoric. Another important work is his commentary to Vergil's Aeneis (book 6), which focuses on religious problems.

== Major works ==
- Die antike Kunstprosa vom VI. Jahrhundert v. Chr. bis in die Zeit der Renaissance (1898).
- P. Vergilius Maro Aeneis Buch VI (1903, 1916, 1927).
- Agnostos Theos; Untersuchungen zur Formengeschichte religiöser Rede (1913).
- Ennius und Vergilius; Kriegsbilder aus Roms grosser Zeit (1915).
- Die germanische Urgeschichte in Tacitus Germania (1921).
- Die Geburt des Kindes; Geschichte einer religiösen Idee (1924).
- Alt-Germanien; völker- und namengeschichtliche Untersuchungen (1934).
- Aus altrömischen Priesterbüchern (1939).
