= Ettore Bignone =

Italian classical philologist

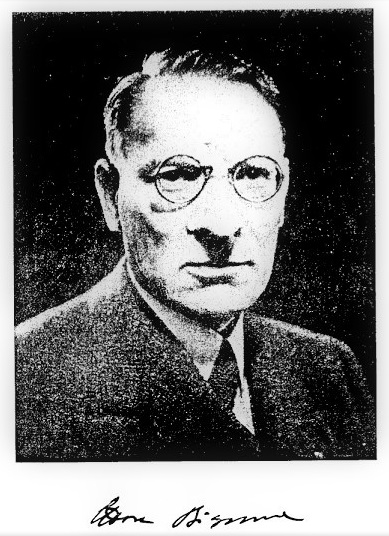
- Born: 17 December 1879 Nuoro, Italy
- Died: 11 August 1953 (aged 73)
- Occupation: Philologist and man of letters

Ettore Bignone (17 December 1879 – 11 August 1953) was an Italian classical philologist and man of letters.

== Early life and career ==
Ettore Bignone was born to Carlo and Anita Matteucci. He graduated in Classical Literature in Turin, with a dissertation on Lucretius, in 1901 and in Philosophy in 1902. He then began his training as a teacher, from a gymnasium in Sicily at the Manzoni high school in Milan. He later joined the University of Pavia before Giuseppe Fraccaroli and Carlo Pascal.

On 14 December 1910 he was inducted in the Freemasonry in the "Colonia Augusta" Lodge in Verona.

On 1 January 1922 he was appointed as a Professor of Greek literature at the University of Palermo. When he reached the university chair, his authority as a scholar had already established with his writings: in 1916 a work on Empedocles, the mature result of years of preparation, awarded by the Academy of Sciences of Turin, followed in 1920 by a very important analytical study on Epicurus which testified to his solid philological preparation and which made him known in philosophical circles.

The following year he published: Eros, the love book of Greek poetry and the Greek Epigram and in 1924 the Idylls of Theocritus, to which a precious critical study was added ten years later.

Preceded by the fame of an expert man, in 1925 he was called to Florence as a professor of classical philology and then of Greek and Latin literature; and as such he continued his teaching until his placement outside the role, which took place in 1950.

Bignone also had the opportunity to return to Sicily where he staged the representation of the Sophocles tragedies Le Trachinie (1933), Oedipus a Colono (1936), Ajax (1939) with great success.

He received the Mussolini Prize in 1938, and was named as "Academic of Italy" in 1939. He published his major work The Lost Aristotle and the philosophical formation of Epicurus in 1936, the most significant acquisitions of 20th century philology.

In 1937 he published the studies on Sophocles, Euripides and Horace collected in a single volume named Poeti Apollinei and in 1938 the studies on ancient thought containing, expanded, some essays previously published in Antiphon. The book of Greek literature dates back to 1940 and a book of Latin literature for schools in the following years.

Since then he devoted himself almost completely to reprint his works starting a great history of Latin Literature that begun in 1942 and reached its third volume in 1950.

== Death ==
After the death of his dearest Angioletta Coscia, he continued to work on his studies of Latin literature. But while he was preparing the material for the fourth volume with help from his sister Adelina, he died.

== Works ==
- Il pensiero platonico e il Timeo, in «Atene e Roma», 13, 1910.
- I poeti filosofi della Grecia: Empedocle, Torino, Bocca, 1916.
- Epicuro, Bari, Laterza, 1920.
- Eros, il libro di amore della poesia greca, Torino, Chiantore, 1921
- L'epigramma greco, Bologna, Zanichelli, 1921.
- L'Epica di Omero e Virgilio, 1926.
- Teocrito - Gli Idilli, Palermo, Sandron, 1924.
- Sofocle - Le Trachinie, Firenze, Sansoni, 1933.
- Teocrito - Saggio critico, Bari, Laterza, 1934.
- Edipo a Colono, Firenze, Sansoni, 1936.
- L'Aristotele perduto e la formazione filosofica di Epicuro, Firenze, La Nuova Italia, 1936.
- I poeti apollinei: Sofocle, Euripide, Orazio, Bari, Laterza, 1937.
- Studi sul pensiero antico, Napoli, Loffredo, 1938.
- Le tragedie di Sofocle tradotte in versi italiani, quattro volumi, Firenze, Sansoni, 1937 - 1938.
- Le tragedie di Eschilo tradotte in versi italiani, due volumi, Firenze, Sansoni, 1939.
- Il libro della letteratura greca, Firenze, Sansoni, 1940.
- Il libro della letteratura latina, Firenze, Le Monnier, 1946.
- Storia della letteratura latina (incompiuto), volume primo, Firenze, Sansoni, 1942; volume secondo, Ibidem, 1945; volume terzo, Ibidem, 1950.
- Problemi e orientamenti critici delle lingue e delle letterature classiche (opera diretta da Ettore Bignone), volume primo, Milano, Marzorati, 1948; volume secondo, Ibidem, 1951.

== Bibliography ==
- Giuliano Attilio Piovano, Gli studi di greco, Rome, Fondazione Leonardo, 1914, pp. 23, 37-38.
- Luigi Alfonsi, Una nuova storia della letteratura latina, in "Aevum", 1943, pp. 71–79.
- Guido Calogero, Gli studi italiani sulla filosofia antica, in Cinquant'anni di vita intellettuale italiana, volume primo, Napoli, Edizioni scientifiche italiane, 1950.
- Augusto Rostagni, Gli studi di letteratura greca, Ibidem.
- Ettore Paratore, Gli studi di latino negli ultimi cinquant'anni, Ibidem.
- Eugenio Garin, Ettore Bignone storico della filosofia, in "Athens and Rome", 1953, pp. 165–170.
- Vittorio Bartoletti, in "Gnomon", XXVI, 1954.
- Luigi Alfonsi, Ricordo di Ettore Bignone, in "Convivium", 1954, pp. 373–377.
- Adolfo Omodeo, Il senso della storia, Torino, Einaudi, 1955, pp. 75–77.
- Domenico Pesce, Ettore Bignone interprete del mondo classico, in "Athens and Rome", 1956, pp. 127–140.
- Giovanni Semerano, Scienza e dolore. Un grande filosofo classico: Ettore Bignone, Firenze, Sansoni antiquariato, 1960.
- Manara Valgimigli, in Poeti e filosofi di Grecia, volume secondo, Firenze, Sansoni, 1964.
- Vittorio Enzo Alfieri, La filosofia e la poesia greca nell'opera di Ettore Bignone, in "Filosofia", 1965, pp. 403–416.
- Luigi Alfonsi, Ettore Bignone, in Letteratura italiana - I Critici, volume quarto, Milano, Marzorati, 1970, pp. 2547–2561.
