= Otto Regenbogen =

German linguist and scholar (1891–1966)

Otto Regenbogen (14 February 1891 – 8 November 1966) was a German linguist and scholar.
