= Małgorzata Dąbrowska =

Polish historian (born 1956)

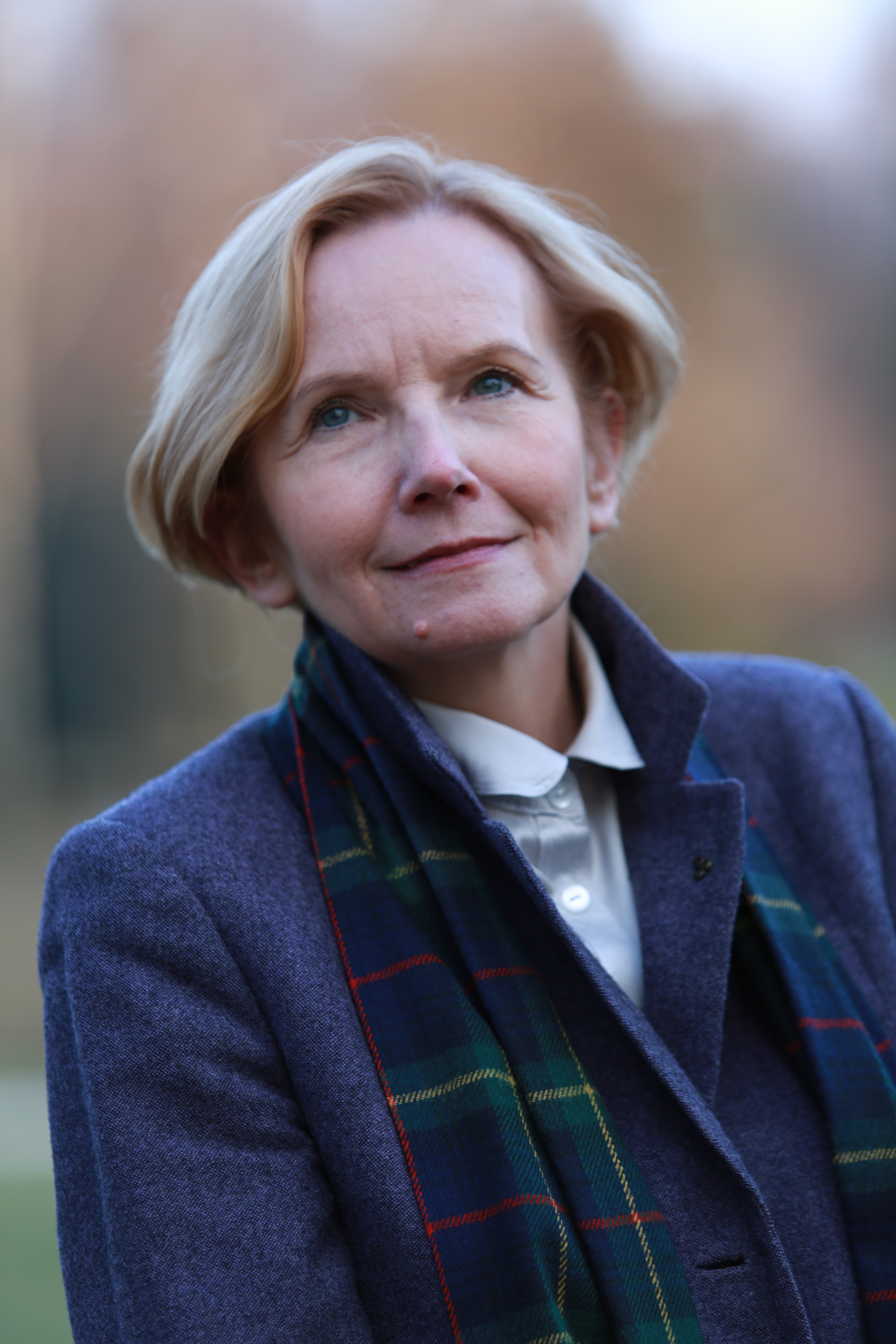
- Born: 11 January 1956 (age 70); Łódź, Poland

Academic background
- Education: University of Łódź

Academic work
- Discipline: History
- Sub-discipline: Byzantine history; Polish history; Imperial marriages; Byzantine-Polish relations
- Institutions: University of Łódź

Małgorzata Dąbrowska (born 11 January 1956) is a Polish historian, Byzantinist, dean of the History Department at the University of Łódź. She specializes in Byzantine studies, specifically the topics of Byzantium and the West in 13th-15th centuries, mixed marriages in the Imperial family of the Palaiologoi, rivalry between the Palaiologoi and Kantakouzenoi families, the Empire of Trebizond and the Pontus, the relationship between Kingdom of Poland and Byzantium, as well as Polish contemporary history.

Representing the Polish Committee of Byzantine Studies, she participated in the 18th International Congress of Byzantine Studies, Moscow (1991), 19th International Congress of Byzantine Studies, Copenhagen (1996), 20th International Congress of Byzantine Studies, Paris (2001), 21st International Congress of Byzantine Studies, London (2006).

She is a member of the Polish Historical Society, International Association of Byzantine Studies, British Society for the Promotion of Byzantine Studies, and council Collegium Artium.

== Awards, prizes, and fellowships ==
- Award for Academic Excellence, University of Łódź (1978)
- President of the University's Award for the book Byzantium, France and the Papacy in the Second half of the 13th century, University of Łódź (1987)
- Fellowship at College de France, French Government (1989)
- Award for Young, Outstanding Scholars, Polish Academy of Sciences (1991)
- TEMPUS Fellowship at the University of Thessaloniki, European Community, Brussels (1992)
- TEMPUS Fellowship at the University of Paris I -Sorbonne, European Community -Brussels (1996)
- Ministry of Education Award for the book Latin Ladies on the Bosporos. Byzantine-Latin marriages in the Imperial family of the Palaiologoi (13th-15th centuries), Polish Government (1998)
- Lanckoronski Fellowship at King's College, London, Lanckoronski Foundation (1999)
- Kosciuszko Foundation Fellowship at Harvard University's Library at Dumbarton Oaks, Washington, DC, The Kosciuszko Foundation (2000)
- Visiting Fellow at All Souls College, Oxford, UK, All Souls College (2001)
- Visiting Fellow of the Kosciuszko Foundation at Rice University, the Kosciuszko Foundation, New York, NY (2005-2008)

== Selected works ==
=== Books ===
- Bizancjum, Francja i Stolica Apostolska w drugiej połowie XIII wieku, Łódź 1986 (in Polish; Byzantium, France and the Holy See in the second Half of the Thirteenth Century) .
- Łacinniczki nad Bosforem. Małżeństwa bizantyńsko - łacińskie w cesarskiej rodzinie Paleologów ( XIII-XV w.), Łódź 1996 (in Polish; The Latin Ladies on the Bosporos. Byzantine- Latin Marriages in the Imperial Family of the Palaiologoi (13th-15th Centuries) .
- (translation) Steven Runciman, Nieszpory Sycylijskie. Dzieje świata śródziemnomorskiego w drugiej połowie XIII wieku, Katowice 1997, 2007 (The Sicilian Vespers: A History of the Mediterranean World in the Later Thirteenth Century, 1958).
- (translation) Cyril Mango, Historia Bizancjum, Gdańsk 1997, 2002 (Byzantium: The Empire of the New Rome, 1980).
- (translation) Donald Nicol, Konstantyn XI. Ostatni cesarz Rzymian, Gdańsk 2004 (The Immortal Emperor: the life and legend of Constantine Palaiologos, last Emperor of the Romans, 1991).
- Let the witnesses speak… Contemporary Polish and Central European Politics and Culture, National Archive Publishing Company, XanEdu, Rice University, Houston, TX, 2007.
- Enough Questions, Enough Answers. Modern Polish poetry in Translation, National Archive Publishing Company, XanEdu, Rice University, Houston, TX 2007.
- Polish Drama in Translation, National Archive Publishing Company, XanEdu, Rice University, Houston, TX, 2006.
- Krzysztof Zanussi’s Cinema, Central and Eastern European Film, National Archive Publishing Company, XanEdu, Rice University, Houston, TX 2006, 2007, 2008.
- The Voice of Byzantium. Byzantium and the Slavs, National Archive Publishing Company, XanEdu, Rice University, Houston, TX 2008.
- (ed.) Oskar Halecki i jego wizja Europy, ed. Małgorzata Dąbrowska, vols. 1-3, Warsaw–Łódź 2012-2014 (Oskar Halecki and its vision of Europe).
- Drugie oko Europy. Bizancjum w średniowieczu, Wrocław 2015 (The other eye Europe. Byzantium in the Middle Ages) .
- (ed.) Kazimierz Zakrzewski. Historia i polityka, red. Małgorzata Dąbrowska, Warsaw–Łódź: Instytut Pamięci Narodowej-Uniwersytet Łódzki 2015.
- (ed.) Stanisław Kościałkowski pamięci przywrócony, red. Małgorzata Dąbrowska, Warsaw–Łódź: Instytut Pamięci Narodowej-Uniwersytet Łódzki 2016.
- The Hidden Secrets. Late Byzantium in the Western and Polish Context, Łódź: Wydawnictwo UŁ 2017.

=== Articles ===
- L’attitude probyzantine de Saint Louis et les opinions des sources francaises concernant cette question, „Byzantinoslavica” 50 (1989), no. 1, pp. 11-23.
- Hellenism et the Court of the Despots of Mistra in the First Half of the Fifteenth Century [in:] Paganism in the Later Roman Empire and Byzantium, ed. Maciej Salamon, "Byzantina et Slavica Cracoviensia" I, Cracow 1991, pp. 157-167 .
- Family Ethos at the Imperial Court of the Paleologos in the Light of the Testimony by Theodore of Montferrat [in:] "Byzantina et Slavica Cracoviensia" II, ed. Maciej Salamon, Anna Różycka-Bryzek, Cracow 1994, pp. 73-81 .
- Peter of Cyprus and Casimir the Great in Cracow, "Byzantiaka" 14 (1994), pp. 257-267 .
- Byzantine Studies Abroad – Poland, "Bulletin of British Byzantine Studies" 20 (1994), pp. 83-85.
- “Cantacuzene - The Wolf” or Matthias Stryjkowski’s Recollection of Byzantium, "Byzantinoslavica" 56 (1995), pp. 257-267.
- Sophia of Montferrat or the History of One Face, "Acta Universitatis Lodziensis. Folia Historica" 56 (1996), pp. 159-171.
- Uzun Hasan’s Project of Alliance with the Polish King (1474) [in:] Melanges d’histoire offerts an Oktawiusz Jurewicz a l’occasion de son soixante - dixieme anniversaire, Łódź 1998, pp. 171-185 .
- From Poland to Tenedos. The Project of Using the Teutonic Order in the Fight against the Turks after the Fall of Constantinople [in:] Beiträge zu einer Table Ronde des XIX International Congress of Byzantine Studies (Copenhagen 1996), hrsg. von Günter Prinzing, Maciej Salamon, Wiesbaden 1999, pp. 165-176 .
- Le roi de France aurait-il pu acheter Byzance?,"Alchimie Francaise. Correspondance des Arts" 4 (2001), no. 3/4, pp. 25-29.
- La vision muscouvite de Byzance et le byzantinism allemande de Koneczny ou Byzance sans Byzance, "Organon" 28-30 (1999/2001), pp. 257-268.
- L’epreuve de Dieu. Pelerinages dans la contemporaine historiographie polonaise, Compostelle. Cahiers d’Etudes et d’Historie Compostellanes, 2002, pp. 72-75.
- Byzantine Lady’s Daughters in Poland [in:] Byzantium and East central Europe, ed. Günter Prinzing, Maciej Salamon with the assistance of Paul Stephenson, "Byzantina et Slavica Cracoviensia" III, Cracow 2001, pp. 197-202 .
- Byzance, source des stereotypes dans la conscience des Polonais [in:] Byzance en Europe, ed. M. F. Auzepy, Paris 2003, pp. 43-54.
- “Vasilisaa ergo gaude…” Cleopa Malatesta’s Byzantine CV, "Byzantinoslavica" 53 (2005), pp. 217-224 .
- Power of Virtue. The Case of the Last Palaiologoi [in:] Cesarstwo Bizantyńskie. Dzieje, religia, kultura. Studia ofiarowane profesorowi Waldemarowi Ceranowi przez jego uczniów na 70-lecie urodzin, ed. Piotr Krupczyński i Mirosław Jerzy Leszka, Łódź 2006, pp. 9-25.
- Ought One to Marry ? Manuel II Palaiologos Point of View, "Byzantine and Modern Greek Studies" 31 (2007), no. 2, pp. 146-156 .
- Was there any room on Bosporus for a Latin Lady?, "Byzantinoslavica" 56 (2008), no. 1/2, pp. 229-239.
- Could Poland have reacted to the submission of Byzantium to the Turks 1372-1373? [in:] Captain and Scholar. Papers in Memory of Demetrios Polemis, ed. E. Chrysos, E. Zachariadou, Andros 2009, pp. 79-92.
- Byzantine Frescoes Chapel from Lusignans’ Cyprus in Houston, "Ikonotheka" 21(2009), pp. 21-32
- "Byzantine Empresses". Mediations in the Feud between the Palaiologoi (13th-15th centuries) [in:] Konfliktbewältigung und Friedensstiftung im Mittelalter = Przezwyciężanie konfliktów i ustanawianie pokoju w średniowieczu, hrsg. von Roman Czaja, Eduard Mühle, Andrzej Radzimiński, Toruń 2012, pp. 227-239 .
- Die Herrschaft des Kaisers Manuel I. Kommenos in den Augen von Johannes Kinnamos [in:] Macht und Spiegel der Macht Herrschaft in Europa im 12. und 13. Jahrhundert vor der Hintergrund der Chronistik, Herausgegeben von Norbert Kersken und Grischa Vercamer, Wiesbaden: Harrassowitz Verlag 2013, pp. 419–432. Deutsches Historisches Institut Warschau Quellen und Studien Herausgegeben von Eduard Mühle, Band 27.
- A Cypriot Story about Love and Hatred, "Text Matters. A journal of literature, theory and culture" 4 (2014), pp. 197-206
- Images of Trebizond and the Pontos in contemporary literature in English with gothic conclusion, "Text Matters. A journal of literature theory and culture" 6 (2016), pp. 247–263 .
