= Paul Lemerle =

French Byzantinist

Paul Lemerle (French pronunciation: [pol ləmɛʁl]; 22 April 1903 – 17 July 1989) was a French Byzantinist, born in Paris, France.

== Biography ==
Lemerle taught at the École française d'Athènes (1931–1941), at the Faculté des Lettres of the University of Burgundy at Dijon (1942–1947), at the École Pratique des Hautes Études (1947–1968), at the Sorbonne (1958–1967) and at the Collège de France (1967–1973). He completed his doctoral dissertation in 1945, on the city of Philippi and eastern Macedonia during the Byzantine period.

He was the founding president of the International Association of Byzantine Studies (AIEB).

He died in Paris.

== Works ==
- Le style byzantin. 1943.
- Philippes et la Macédoine orientale à l'époque chrétienne et byzantine. Thèse de doctorat, Paris, 1945.
- L'émirat d'Aydin, Byzance et l'Occident. 1957.
- Histoire de Byzance. 1960. Translated into English as A history of Byzantium. 1964.
- Élèves et professeurs à Constantinople au Xe siècle. 1969.
- Le premier humanisme byzantin. 1971. Translated into English as Byzantine humanism, the first phase. 1986. Translated into Russian as Первый византийский гуманизм. 2012.
- Cinq études sur le XIe siècle Byzantin. 1977.
- Le monde de Byzance. 1978.
- Les plus anciens recueils des miracles de Saint Démétrius et la pénétration des Slaves dans les Balkans. 1979.
- The agrarian history of Byzantium from the origins to the twelfth century. 1979.
- Essais sur le monde byzantin. 1980.

== Sources ==
- Dagron, Gilbert. "Paul Lemerle 1903–1989" (PDF) (in French). Collège de France. Archived from the original (PDF) on 28 December 2010.
- Beck, Hans-Georg. "Paul Lemerle, † 17.7.1989". Byzantinische Zeitschrift (in German). 82 (1–2): 34. doi:10.1515/byzs.1989.82.1-2.U.
