= Chrysostomides =

Chrysostomides or Chrysostomidis (Greek: Χρυσοστομίδης) is a surname of Greek-language origin. The feminine form is Chrysostomidou (Χρυσοστομίδου). Notable people with the surname include:

- Julian Chrysostomides (1928–2008), Greek historian
- Kypros Chrysostomides (1942–2022), Cypriot politician
