= International Association of Byzantine Studies =

International Association of Byzantine Studies (French: Association Internationale des Études Byzantines, AIEB) was launched in 1948. It is an international co-ordinating body that links national Byzantine studies member groups.

== Background and Activities ==
The AIEB was established in 1948 as an outgrowth of various international Byzantine Studies congresses with the goal of coordinating activities amongst different local and regional Byzantine Studies associations. Since 1964, it has published a bulletin, the Bulletin d'information et de coordination, and in 2017, it began releasing a monthly newsletter, Byzantine News. The AIEB also oversees a number of commissions that support and promote areas of specialised research. Such commissions include the Corpus Fontium Historiae Byzantinae, Inscriptiones Graecae Aevi Byzantini, the AIEB Development Commission, the Commission for the History of Byzantine Art, the Commission for the Historical Geography and Spatial Analysis of Byzantium, the Commission for Byzantine Archaeology, and the Commission for Byzantine Sigillography.

== Leadership ==
Former and current presidents and honorary presidents of the AIEB include:

- 1949–1961: Henri Grégoire (historian) (President); Gabriel Millet (Honorary President)
- 1961–1966: Paul Lemerle (President); Henri Grégoire (historian), Franz Dölger, and George Ostrogorsky (Honorary Presidents)
- 1966–1971: Paul Lemerle (President); Franz Dölger, George Ostrogorsky, André Grabar, and Viktor Lazarev (Honorary Presidents)
- 1971–1976: Dionysios Zakythinos (President); André Grabar, Paul Lemerle, George Ostrogorsky (Honorary Presidents)
- 1976–1986: Herbert Hunger (President); André Grabar, Paul Lemerle, Bruno Lavagnini, Anastasios Orlandos, George Ostrogorsky, Steven Runciman, Andreas Xyngopoulos, and Dionysios Zakythinos (Honorary Presidents)
- 1986–1991: Ihor Ševčenko (President); Helene Ahrweiler, André Grabar, Herbert Hunger, Bruno Lavagnini, Paul Lemerle, Steven Runciman, and Dionysios Zakythinos (Honorary Presidents)
- 1991–1996: Ihor Ševčenko (President); Helene Ahrweiler, Hans-Georg Beck, Herbert Hunger, Bruno Lavagnini, Steven Runciman, and Dionysios Zakythinos (Honorary Presidents)
- 1996–2001: Gilbert Dagron (President); Helene Ahrweiler, Herbert Hunger, Dimitri Obolensky, Steven Runciman, and Ihor Ševčenko (Honorary Presidents)
- 2001–2006: Peter Schreiner (President), Helene Ahrweiler, Gilbert Dagron, Cyril Mango, Dimitri Obolensky, and Ihor Ševčenko (Honorary Presidents)
- 2006–2011: Peter Schreiner (President), Helene Ahrweiler, Gilbert Dagron, Cyril Mango, Dimitri Obolensky, and Ihor Ševčenko (Honorary Presidents)
- 2011–2016: Johannes Koder (President); John Haldon (Substitute President); Helene Ahrweiler and Cyril Mango (Honorary Presidents)
- 2016–2022: John Haldon (President); Juan Signes Codoñer (Substitute President); Helene Ahrweiler and Cyril Mango (Honorary Presidents)
- from 2022: Antonio Rigo (President); Andrei Timotin (Substitute President)

== Participating National Committees ==
Current national members of the AIEB include:

- Albania
- Argentina
- Armenia
- Australia
- Austria
- Belgium
- Bulgaria
- Canada
- China
- Croatia
- Cyprus
- Czech Republic
- Denmark
- Estonia
- Finland
- France
- Georgia
- Germany
- Great Britain
- Greece
- Hungary
- Israel
- Italy
- Japan
- Netherlands
- North Macedonia
- Norway
- Poland
- Romania
- Russia
- Serbia
- Slovakia
- Sweden
- Switzerland
- Türkiye
- Ukraine
- USA
- Vatican

== See also ==
- Byzantine studies
- Corpus Fontium Historiae Byzantinae
- Society for the Promotion of Byzantine Studies
- International Congress of Byzantine Studies
