= Herbert Hunger =

Austrian Byzantinist (1914–2000)

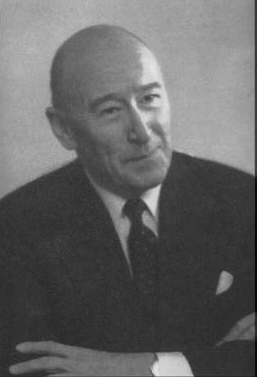
- Herbert Hunger
- Born: 9 December 1914; Vienna, Austro-Hungarian Monarchy
- Died: 9 July 2000 (aged 85); Vienna, Austria

Academic background
- Education: University of Vienna
- Thesis: Der Realismus in den Tragödien des Euripides (1936)
- Doctoral advisor: Johannes Mewaldt

Academic work
- Discipline: Byzantine studies
- Sub-discipline: Byzantine literature Greek palaeography
- Institutions: University of Vienna (1954–1985); Austrian Academy of Sciences (1959–2000)
- Doctoral students: Johannes Koder; Wolfram Hörandner; Otto Kresten
- Notable students: Erich Trapp; Werner Seibt
- Notable works: Die hochsprachliche profane Literatur der Byzantiner (1978)

Herbert Hunger (9 December 1914 – 9 July 2000) was an Austrian Byzantinist, palaeographer and university professor, who held the first chair in Byzantine studies in Austria from 1962 to 1985, and presided over the International Association of Byzantine Studies from 1976 to 1986. He was the editor-in-chief of the Jahrbuch der Österreichischen Byzantinistik from 1954 until his death, and co-editor-in-chief of the Byzantinische Zeitschrift from 1964 to 1983. He initiated the Tabula Imperii Byzantini project at the Austrian Academy of Sciences in 1966 and was the Academy's president from 1973 to 1982. He specialised in secular Byzantine literature. Hunger served in an armoured Wehrmacht division throughout World War II.

== Biography ==
Hunger was born in Vienna as the only child of the state rail councillor Hermann and Johanna née Kölbl. He attended the Humanistische Gymnasium in the Hietzing district of Vienna from 1924 to 1932. He studied classical philology with Ludwig Radermacher and Karl Mras, classical archaeology with Camillo Praschniker and German studies with Josef Nadler at the University of Vienna, and graduated in 1936 with a dissertation on Euripides supervised by Johannes Mewaldt.

After a brief spell of teaching practice at the Akademisches Gymnasium in central Vienna from January 1937, he enlisted as a one-year volunteer to pursue an officer's career with the cavalry of the Austrian Armed Forces (i.e. major general Alfred von Hubicki's Schnelle Division) in the autumn of the same year. His mobile unit was incorporated into the Wehrmacht as the 4th Light Division shortly after the Anschluss of Austria, in April 1938. Hunger applied for leave from the army in October 1938 and worked as a temporary teacher at the Realgymnasium XIV in Penzing, Vienna, until July 1939, when he was called up for military exercises and the subsequent launch of World War II. His unit participated in the invasion of Poland in September and October 1939, then as the 9th Panzer Division in the invasion of the Netherlands in May 1940, in the invasion of France in June 1940 (as part of the Panzer Group Guderian), in the invasion of Yugoslavia and invasion of Greece in April 1941 (as the spearhead of the 12th Army), and in the attack on the Soviet Union in June 1941. Hunger fought on the Eastern Front until his wounding and capture by the Red Army towards the end of the war. He was held as a prisoner of war in the Soviet Union for two and a half years until late 1947, when he returned to Vienna.

He entered the manuscripts department of the Austrian National Library and after completing his librarian examination in 1949 he was charged by the departing director Josef Bick with cataloguing the nearly 1,100 Greek manuscripts of the Bibliotheca Palatina Vindobonensis collection. He was made head of the papyrus collection in 1956. Based on his track record of publications, he achieved habilitation in the field of Byzantine Studies in 1954 and joined the University of Vienna as a private lecturer. In 1962 he was made professor and director of the newly created Institute for Byzantine Studies, which he led until his retirement in 1985.

He was admitted to the Austrian Academy of Sciences in 1959 as a corresponding member, becoming full member in 1962. From 1959 to 1996 he served as president of the Austrian Byzantine Society. He served as secretary of the Academy's Philosophical-Historical Class from 1963, as secretary general from 1964, and as vice president from 1970. In 1966 he initiated the Tabula Imperii Byzantini project through the Academy's Commission for Byzantine Studies, founded in 1948, and acted as the chairman of the project's own commission until 1995. From 1966 until his death he also was the chairman of the commission for the Corpus Fontium Historiae Byzantinae editorial project. In 1970/1971 he was Dean of the Faculty of Philosophy of the University of Vienna. In 1971 he became chairman of the Commission for Byzantine Studies, and held the position until 1995. From 1973 to 1982, he served two consecutive terms as president of the Academy. From 1976 to 1986 he presided over the International Association of Byzantine Studies (AIEB). As incumbent president of the AIEB, he organized the XVI International Congress of Byzantine Studies in Vienna, which was attended by more than 1,100 scholars.

From 1954 to his death he directed the Jahrbuch der Österreichischen Byzantinischen Gesellschaft, renamed Jahrbuch der österreichische Byzantinistik in 1961. He was one of the editors-in-chief of the Byzantinische Zeitschrift from 1964 to 1983, and founded and directed several new series of Byzantine studies monographs: Wiener Byzantinistiche Studien (1964), Byzantina Vindobonensia (1965), Veröffentlichungen der Kommission für die Tabula Imperii Byzantini (1973), Veröffentlichungen der Kommission für Byzantinistik (1976).

He married Ruth Friedrich, whom he met on army furlough in Dresden in 1940, in Vienna in October 1941. They had three children: Hermann (1942), Dietrich (1944) and Dorothea (1949).

== Research activity ==
Hunger is considered the founder of the Vienna School of Byzantine Studies. While his output covered various aspects of Byzantine studies, his main concerns were Byzantine society and literature, book culture in Byzantium and Greek handwriting. He became interested in Greek palaeography during his years at the Austrian National Library, while studying the Greek papyri held by the institution and working on the catalogue of the Greek manuscripts of the library. His interest in Greek handwriting led him to elaborate and publish capital contributions on the subject, being his communication to the Paris colloquium of 1974 and, later, the organization and the launch of the Repertorium der griechischen Kopisten 800–1600, being the catalogue of all known Greek medieval scribes. Hunger is also responsible for having coined terms such as "Perlschrift" ("pearl script"), "Fettaugenmode" (literally "resembling fatty globules") and "Auszeichnungsschriften" ("distinctive script") to describe particular styles of medieval Greek handwriting.

Hunger was also a respected textual critic. In 1959 and 1970 he revised the volumes I/2 and I/1 respectively of August Hausrath's Bibliotheca Teubneriana edition of the Corpus fabularum Aesopicarum. In 1964 he published the first volume of the Wiener byzantinistische Studien (WBS) series, a monograph on the proems of Byzantine documents as literary and political products of their time, which also included the critical edition of an anthology of proems he found in Vienna manuscripts. Five years later, he also published in the WBS a monograph on John Chortasmenos, with critical edition of his works, and in 1981 he edited a metaphrase in vulgar Greek of books XI to XIII of Anne Komnene's "Alexias". In 1990, he published a critical edition of Prochoros Kydones' Greek translation of the first book of St. Augustine's treatise "On Free Will" and ps.-Augustine's "On the Ten Plagues of Egypt".

In 1981, he started the project of the complete critical edition of the register of the Patriarchate of Constantinople, directing the enterprise and signing the first two volumes as co-editor and contributing to the third, appeared in 2001, and editing two volumes of complementary studies.

His complete bibliography was published by his student Peter Soustal in 2001, and reprinted in 2019.

== Works ==
=== Monographs ===
- Prooimion. Elemente der byzantinischen Kaiseridee in den Arengen der Urkunden (Wiener Byzantinistische Studien, 1), Wien: Hermann Böhlaus Nachfolger, 1964, ISBN 978-3-7001-1265-5
- Reich der neuen Mitte. Der christliche Geist der byzantinischen Kultur, Graz: Verlag Styria, 1965
- Johannes Chortasmenos (ca. 1340 – ca. 1436/37). Briefe, Gedichte und kleine Schriften (Wiener Byzantinistische Studien, 7), Wien: Hermann Böhlaus Nachfolger, 1969, ISBN 978-3-7001-0887-0
- Aspekte der griechischen Rhetorik von Gorgias bis zum Untergang von Byzanz (Sitzungsberichte der philosophisch-historischen Klasse der Österreichischen Akademie der Wissenschaften, 277/3), Wien: Verlag der österreichischen Akademie der Wissenschaften, 1972, ISBN 978-3-7001-0883-2
- Byzantinische Grundlagenforschung. Gesammelte Aufsätze (Collected Studies, 21), London: Variorum Reprints, 1973
- Die hochsprachliche profane Literatur der Byzantiner (Handbuch der Altertumswissenschaft, 12.5.1-2), München: C. H. Beck, 1978
- Des Nikephoros Blemmydes Basilikos Andrias und dessen Metaphrase von Georgios Galesiotes und Georgios Oinaiotes. Ein weiterer Beitrag zum Verständnis der byzantinischen Schrift-Koine (with Ihor Ševčenko; Wiener Byzantinistische Studien, 18), Wien: Hermann Böhlaus Nachfolger, 1986
- Epidosis. Gesammelte Schriften zur byzantinischen Geistes- und Kulturgeschichte, München: Editio Maris, 1989, ISBN 9783925801051
- Schreiben und Lesen in Byzanz. Die byzantinische Buchkultur, München: C. H. Beck, 1989
- Das Denken am Leitseil der Sprache. Johann Nestroys geniale wie auch banale Verfremdung der Sprache durch Neologismen (Sitzungsberichte der philosophisch-historischen Klasse der Österreichischen Akademie der Wissenschaften, 664), Wien: Verlag der österreichischen Akademie der Wissenschaften, 1999

=== Edited volumes ===
- Lexikon der griechischen und römischen Mythologie, Wien: Hollinck, 1953
- Studien zur griechischen Paläographie (Biblos-Schriften, 5), Wien: Hollinck, 1954
- Corpus fabularum Aesopicarum (with August Hausrath, Bibliotheca Teubneriana), Lipsiae: B.G. Teubner, vols. I/1 and I/2, 1959–1970
- Theodoros Prodromos, Der byzantinische Katz–Mäuse–Krieg (Byzantina Vindobonensia, 3), Wien: Hermann Böhlaus Nachfolger, 1963
- Ein byzantinisches Rechenbuch des 15. Jahrhunderts. 100 Aufgaben aus dem Codex Vindobonensis Phil. Gr. 65. Text, Übersetzung und Kommentar (with Kurt Vogel; Denkschriften der philosophisch-historischen Klasse der Österreichischen Akademie der Wissenschaften, 78/22), Wien: Verlag der österreichischen Akademie der Wissenschaften, 1963
- Akten der XVI. internationaler Byzantinistenkongress. Wien, 4.–9. Oktober 1981 (Jahrbuch der österreichischen Byzantinistik, 31.1–2 and 31.1–7), 2 vols., Wien: Verlag der österreichischen Akademie der Wissenschaften, 1981
- Anonyme Metaphrase zu Anna Komnene, Alexias XI–XIII. Ein Beitrag zur Erschließung der byzantinischen Umgangssprache (Wiener Byzantinistische Studien, 15), Wien: Verlag der österreichischen Akademie der Wissenschaften, 1981, ISBN 978-3-7001-0376-9
- Repertorium der griechischen Kopisten 800–1600 (with Ernst Gamillscheg and Dieter Harlfinger, vol. III also with Paolo Eleuteri; Veröffentlichungen der Kommission für Byzantinistik, III.1–3), 3 vols., Wien: Verlag der österreichischen Akademie der Wissenschaften, 1981–1997
- Studien zum Patriarchatsregister von Konstantinopel (vol. II with Otto Kresten; Sitzungsberichte der philosophisch-historischen Klasse der Österreichischen Akademie der Wissenschaften, 383 and 647), 2 vols., Wien: Verlag der österreichischen Akademie der Wissenschaften, 1981–1997
- Das Register der Patriarchats von Konstantinopel (with Otto Kresten, vol. II also with Ewald Kislinger and Carolina Cupane; Corpus Fontium Historiae Byzantinae, 19.1–2), 2 vols., Wien: Verlag der österreichischen Akademie der Wissenschaften, 1981–1995
- Prochoros Kydones, Übersetzung von acht Briefen des Hl. Augustinus (Wiener Studien – Beihefte, 9), Wien: Verlag der österreichischen Akademie der Wissenschaften, 1984
- Prochoros Kydones, Übersetzungen von S. Augustinus, De libero arbitrio I 1–90 und Ps.-Augustinus, De decem plagis Aegyptiorum (lateinisch-griechisch) (Wiener Studien – Beihefte, 14), Wien: Verlag der österreichischen Akademie der Wissenschaften, 1990, ISBN 978-3-7001-1719-3

=== Selected articles ===
- — (1954), "Die Perlschrift, eine Stilrichtung der griechischen Buchschrift des 11. Jahrhunderts", in Hunger, Herbert (ed.), Studien zur griechischen Paläographie, Biblos-Schriften, 5, Wien: Hollinck, pp. 22–32
- — (1961), "Antikes und mittelalterliches Buch- und Schriftwesen", in Hunger, Herbert; Stegmüller, Otto; Erbse, Harmut; Imhof, Max; Büchner, Karl; Beck, Hans-Georg; Rüdiger, Horst (eds.), Geschichte der Textüberlieferung der antiken und mittelalterlichen Literatur, Zürich: Atlantis-Verlag, pp. 25–147
- — (1977), "Minuskel und Auszeichnungsschriften im 10.–12. Jahrhundert", in Glénisson, Jean; Bompaire, Jacques; Irigoin, Jean (eds.), La paléographie grecque et byzantine, Colloques internationaux de Centre national de la recherche scientifique, 559, Paris: Éditions du CNRS, pp. 201–220

== Academic recognition ==
Hunger was honoured with three Festschriften by his friends and colleagues:

- Koder, Johannes, ed. (1964). Akrothinia sodalium Seminarii Byzantini Vindobonensis Herberto Hunger oblata. Wien: Universität Wien, Institut für Byzantinistik.
- Hörandner, Wolfram; Koder, Johannes; Kresten, Otto; Trapp, Erich, eds. (1984). Byzantios. Festschrift für Herbert Hunger zum 70. Geburtstag. Wien: Ernst Becvar.
- Hörandner, Wolfram; Koder, Johannes; Kresten, Otto, eds. (1994). ΑΝΔΡΙΑΣ. Festschrift für Herbert Hunger zum 80. Geburtstag. Jahrbuch der österreichischen Byzantinistik, 44. Wien: Verlag der österreichischen Akademie der Wissenschaften.

== Decorations and awards ==
- Grand Commander of the Order of the Phoenix (Greece)
- Grand Cross of Merit with Star of the Order of Merit of the Federal Republic of Germany
- 1968: Wilhelm Hartel Prize
- 1979: City of Vienna Prize for Humanities
- 1980: elected to the American Philosophical Society
- 1981: Austrian Decoration for Science and Art
- Grand Gold Decoration for Services to the Republic of Austria
- Grand Gold Decoration for Services to the City of Vienna

== Bibliography ==
- Koder, Johannes (2000), "Herbert Hunger (1914–2000)" (PDF), Jahrbuch der österreichischen Byzantinistik, 50: V–XIII
- Kresten, Otto (1999–2000), "Herbert Hunger" (PDF), Almanach (Österreichische Akademie der Wissenschaften), 150: 457–477, ISSN 0378-8644
