= Corpus Scriptorum Historiae Byzantinae =

Series of primary sources for the study of Byzantine history

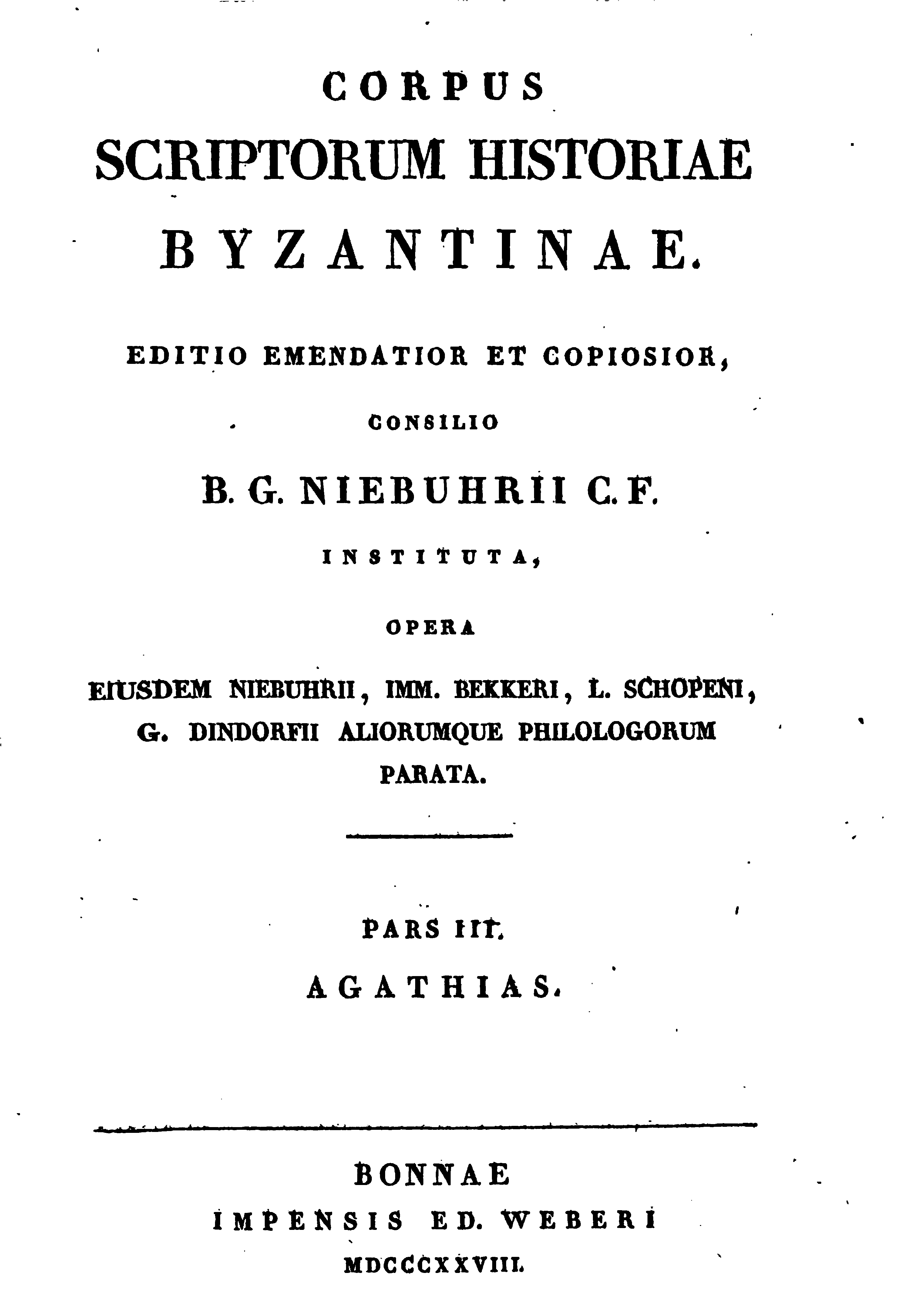
Corpus Scriptorum Historiae Byzantinae

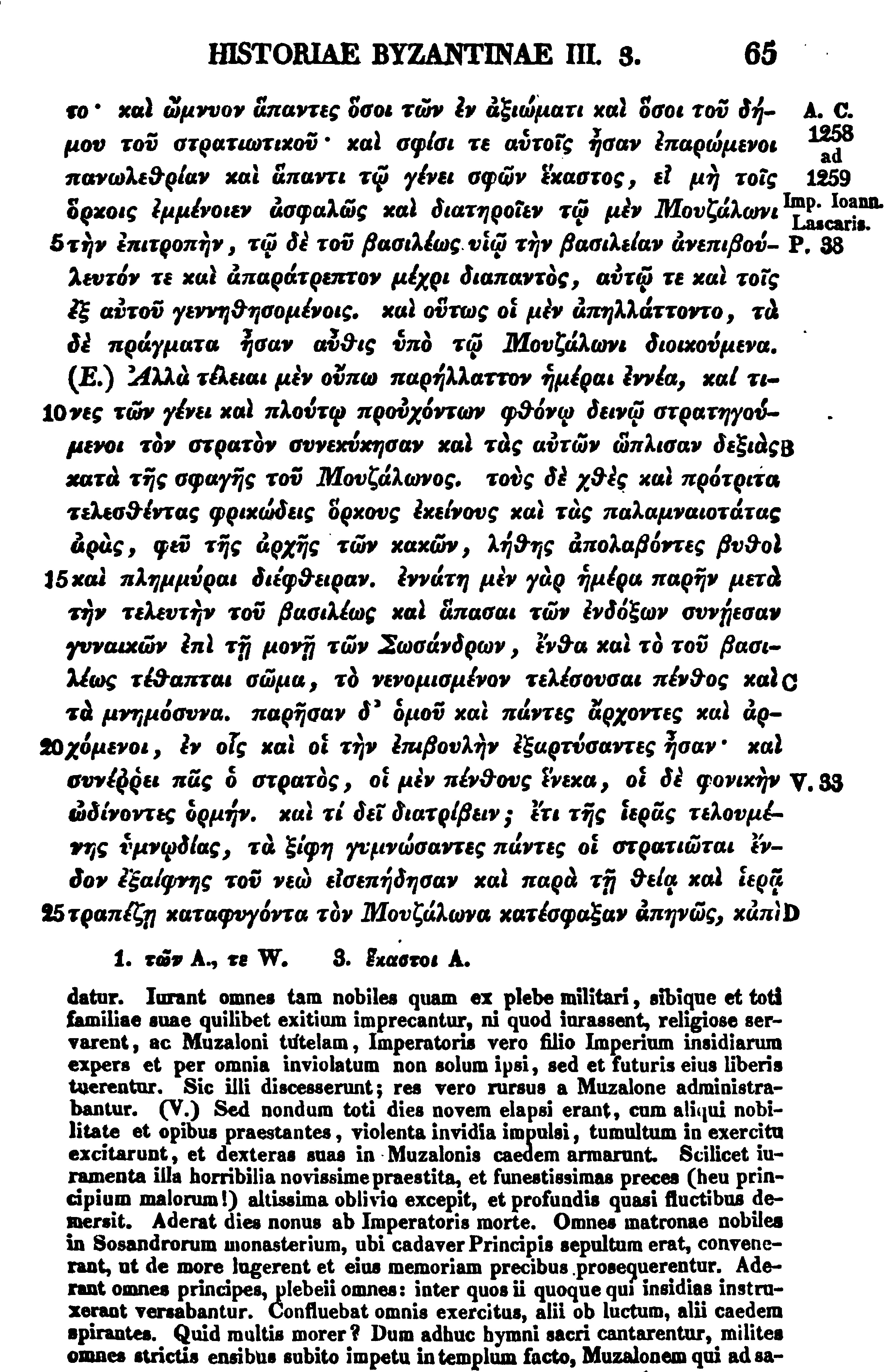
Text (the History of Nikephoros Gregoras) from the CSHB

The Corpus Scriptorum Historiae Byzantinae (CSHB; English: Corpus of Byzantine history writers), also referred to as the Bonn Corpus, is a monumental fifty-volume series of primary sources for the study of Byzantine history (c. 330–1453), published in the German city of Bonn between 1828 and 1897. Each volume contains a critical edition of a Byzantine Greek historical text, accompanied by a parallel Latin translation. The project, conceived by the historian Barthold Georg Niebuhr, sought to revise and expand the original twenty-four volume Corpus Byzantinae Historiae (sometimes called the Byzantine du Louvre), published in Paris between 1648 and 1711 under the initial direction of the Jesuit scholar Philippe Labbe. The series was first based at the University of Bonn; after Niebuhr's death in 1831, however, oversight of the project passed to his collaborator Immanuel Bekker at the Prussian Academy of Sciences in Berlin.

While the first volume of the series received praise for its "minute care and attention" to textual details, later volumes produced under Bekker became infamous for their frequent misprints, careless execution, and general unreliability. Given these shortcomings, the International Association of Byzantine Studies established in 1966 the Corpus Fontium Historiae Byzantinae to re-edit many of the texts included in the Bonn edition of the CSHB.

== Volumes ==
- 1: Agathias, ed. Niebuhr (Bonn, 1828)
- 2: Anna Comnena, ed. Schopen, vol. 1 (Bonn, 1839)
- 3: Anna Comnena, ed. Reifferscheid, vol. 2 (Bonn, 1878)
- 4: Michael Attaliota, ed. Bekker (Bonn, 1853)
- 5: Ioannes Cantacuzenus, ed. Schopen, vol. 1 (Bonn, 1828)
- 6: Ioannes Cantacuzenus, ed. Schopen, vol. 2 (Bonn, 1831)
- 7: Ioannes Cantacuzenus, ed. Schopen, vol. 3 (Bonn, 1832)
- 8: Georgius Cedrenus, ed. Bekker, vol. 1 (Bonn, 1838)
- 9: Georgius Cedrenus, ed. Bekker, vol. 2 (Bonn, 1839)
- 10: Laonicus Chalcondyles, ed. Bekker (Bonn, 1843)
- 11: Chronicon Paschale, ed. L. Dindorf, vol. 1 (Bonn, 1832)
- 12: Chronicon Paschale, ed. L. Dindorf, vol. 2 (Bonn, 1832)
- 13: Ioannes Cinnamus, Nicephorus Bryennius, ed. Meineke (Bonn, 1836)
- 14: Codinus Curopalates, ed. Bekker (Bonn, 1839)
- 15: Georgius Codinus, ed. Bekker (Bonn, 1843)
- 16: Constantine Porphyrogenitus, ed. Reiske, vol. 1 (Bonn, 1829)
- 17: Constantine Porphyrogenitus, ed. Reiske, vol. 2 (Bonn, 1830)
- 18: Constantine Porphyrogenitus; Hierocles, ed. Bekker, vol. 3 (Bonn, 1840)
- 19: Dexippus, Eunapius, Petrus Patricius, etc., ed. Bekker and Niebuhr (Bonn, 1829)
- 20: Ducas, ed. Bekker (Bonn, 1834)
- 21: Ephraemius, ed. Bekker (Bonn, 1840)
- 22: Georgius Syncellus, Nicephorus Cp, ed. L. Dindorf, vol. 1 (Bonn, 1829)
- 23: Georgius Syncellus, Nicephorus Cp, ed. L. Dindorf, vol. 2 (Bonn, 1829)
- 24: Michael Glycas, ed. Bekker (Bonn, 1836)
- 25: Nicephorus Gregoras, ed. Schopen, vol. 1 (Bonn, 1829)
- 26: Nicephorus Gregoras, ed. Schopen, vol. 2 (Bonn, 1830)
- 27: Nicephorus Gregoras, ed. Bekker, vol. 3 (Bonn, 1855)
- 28: Historia Politica et Patriarchica Constantinopoleos; Epirotica, ed. Bekker (Bonn, 1849)
- 29: Ioannes Lydus, ed. Bekker (Bonn, 1837)
- 30: Leo Diaconus, etc., ed. Hase (Bonn, 1828)
- 31: Leo Grammaticus, Eustathius, ed. Bekker (Bonn, 1842)
- 32: Ioannes Malalas, ed. L. Dindorf (Bonn, 1831)
- 33: Constantinus Manasses, Ioel, Georgius Acropolita, ed. Bekker (Bonn, 1837)
- 34: Merobaudes, Corippus, ed. Bekker (Bonn, 1836)
- 35: Nicetas Choniates, ed. Bekker (Bonn, 1835)
- 36: Georgius Pachymeres, ed. Bekker, vol. 1 (Bonn, 1835)
- 37: Georgius Pachymeres, ed. Bekker, vol. 2 (Bonn, 1835)
- 38: Paulus Silentiarius, George Pisida, Nicephorus Cpolitanus, ed. Bekker (Bonn, 1837)
- 39: Georgius Phrantzes, Ioannes Cananus, Ioannes Anagnostes, ed. Bekker (Bonn, 1828)
- 40: Procopius, ed. K. Dindorf, vol. 1 (Bonn, 1833)
- 41: Procopius, ed. K. Dindorf, vol. 2 (Bonn, 1833)
- 42: Procopius, ed. K. Dindorf, vol. 3 (Bonn, 1838)
- 43: Theophanes Confessor, ed. Classen, vol. 1 (Bonn, 1839)
- 44: Theophanes Confessor, ed. Classen, vol. 2; Anastasius, ed. Bekker (Bonn, 1841)
- 45: Theophanes Continuatus, Ioannes Cameniata, Symeon Magister, Georgius Monachus, ed. Bekker (Bonn, 1838)
- 46: Theophylactus Simocatta, ed. Bekker (Bonn, 1834)
- 47: Ioannes Zonaras, ed. Pinder, vol. 1 (Bonn, 1841)
- 48: Ioannes Zonaras, ed. Pinder, vol. 2 (Bonn, 1844)
- 49: Ioannes Zonaras, ed. Büttner-Wobst, vol. 3 (Bonn, 1897)
- 50: Zosimus, ed. Bekker (Bonn, 1837)

== See also ==
- Byzantine Literature
- Corpus Fontium Historiae Byzantinae
