= International Congress of Byzantine Studies =

The International Congress of Byzantine Studies (French: Congrès international des études Byzantines) is a scholarly conference that promotes the study and preservation of Byzantine history. It has been organized by the International Association of Byzantine Studies since 1948.

== History ==
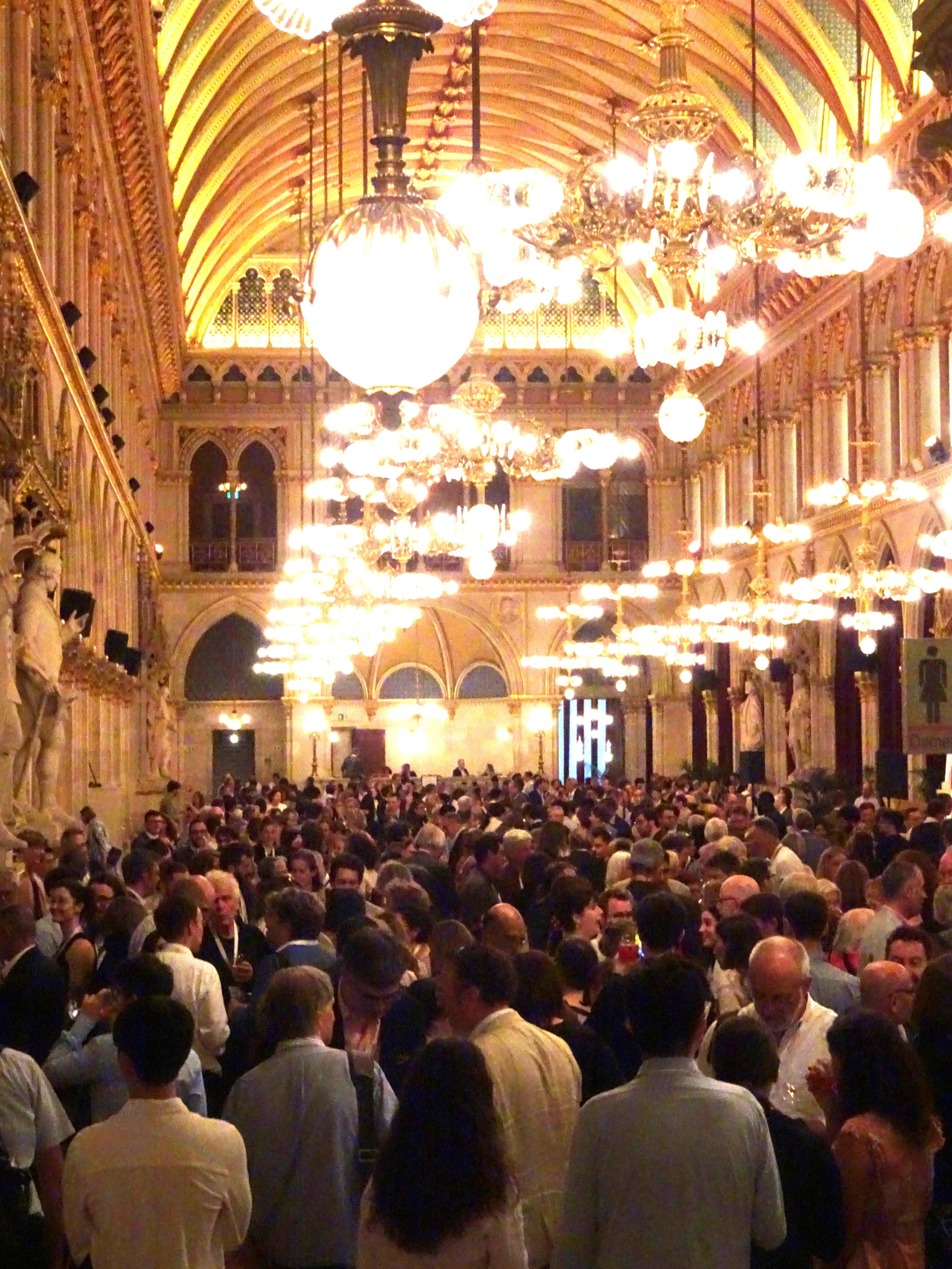
ICBS2026: opening reception at the townhall of Vienna.

The first International Congress of Byzantine Studies was held in Bucharest, Romania, in 1924. It was organized by members of the Romanian Academy to promote Byzantine history after the Dissolution of the Ottoman Empire. The second congress was held in Belgrade, Yugoslavia, under the patronage of King Alexander I in 1929. Subsequent congresses were held in: Athens, Greece, in 1930 & 1932, and Sofia, Bulgaria, in 1934. The sixth congress was supposed to be held in Algiers, then part of French Algeria in October 1939 but was postponed due to the outbreak of World War II.

During World War II, many of the institutions that had organized and contributed to the congress were destroyed or cut off from each other, leading to the creation of several disparate local and regional Byzantine congresses across Europe after the end of the war. In 1948, the French historians Henri Grégoire and Gabriel Millet launched the International Association of Byzantine Studies after they discovered they had each organized a separate International Congress of Byzantine Studies for that year. The sixth congress was held in Paris, France, in July 1948, and all subsequent conferences have been organized by the International Association of Byzantine Studies since then.

In 2020, the twenty fourth congress was postponed and moved from Istanbul to Venice in protest of the Turkish Government's decision to reconvert the Hagia Sofia into a mosque.

== List of Congresses ==
- Bucharest, 1924
- Belgrade, 1929
- Athens, 1930
- Athens, 1932
- Sofia, 1934
- Algiers, 1939 (cancelled)
- Paris, 1948
- Brussels, 1948
- Palermo, 1951
- Thessaloniki, 1953
- Istanbul, 1955
- Munich, 1958
- Ohrid, 1961
- Oxford, 1966
- Bucharest, 1971
- Athens, 1976
- Vienna, 1981
- Washington, D.C, 1986
- Moscow, 1991
- Copenhagen, 1996
- Paris, 2001
- London, 2006
- Sofia, 2011
- Belgrade, 2016
- Venice, 2022
- Vienna, 2026

== See also ==
- Corpus Fontium Historiae Byzantinae
- International Association of Byzantine Studies
- Byzantine Studies
- Society for the Promotion of Byzantine Studies
- Henri Grégoire
