= Corpus Fontium Historiae Byzantinae =

The Corpus Fontium Historiae Byzantinae (English: "Corpus of Byzantine History Sources") or CFHB is an international project that aims to collect, edit, and provide textual criticism on historical sources from the time of the Byzantine Empire (4th–15th centuries AD). Its purpose is to make the works of Byzantine authors, especially those that had previously been unedited, available to modern research in an updated form. The project was launched at the 13th International Congress of Byzantine Studies in Oxford in 1966, and is under the auspices of the International Association of Byzantine Studies (AIEB) and its national branches.

== Publication series ==
Each volume contains comments on the author, the surviving manuscripts as well as a translated and annotated version of the text. The original text is also frequently included, including facsimiles. The CFHB volumes are distinguished, according to their location of publication, in national series:

- Series Atheniensis (Athens)
- Series Berolinensis (Berlin)
- Series Bruxellensis (Brussels)
- Series Italica (Italy)
- Series Parisiensis (Paris)
- Series Thessalonicensis (Thessaloniki)
- Series Vindobonensis (Vienna)
- Series Washingtonensis (Washington D.C., Dumbarton Oaks)

== Published volumes ==
1. Porphyrogenitus, C. (1967). Moravcsik, Gy. (ed.). De administrando imperio. CFHB 1. Translated by Jenkins, R. J. H. (2nd ed.). Dumbarton Oaks: Center for Byzantine Studies. — Series Washingtonensis.
2. Agathias (1975). Keydell, R. (ed.). Historiae. CFHB 2. Berlin: Walter de Gruyter. — Agathias (1975). The Histories. CFHB 2A. Translated by Frendo, J. D. Berlin: Walter de Gruyter. — Series Berolinensis.
3. Choniates, N. (1972). Van Dieten, J. L. (ed.). Orationes et epistulae. CFHB 3. Berlin: Walter de Gruyter. — Series Berolinensis.
4. Caminiata, I. (1973). Böhlig, G. (ed.). De expugnatione Thessalonicae. CFHB 4. Berlin: Walter de Gruyter. — Series Berolinensis.
5. Scylitzes, I. (1973). Thurn, J. (ed.). Synopsis historiarum. CFHB 5. Berlin: Walter de Gruyter. — Series Berolinensis.
6. Nicholas I (1973). Jenkins, R. J. H.; Westerink, L. G. (eds.). Epistulae. CFHB 6. Translated by Jenkins, R. J. H. Dumbarton Oaks: Center for Byzantine Studies. — Series Washingtonensis.
7. Athanasius I (1975). Talbot, A.-M. (ed.). Epistulae. CFHB 7. Translated by Talbot, A.-M. Dumbarton Oaks: Center for Byzantine Studies. — Series Washingtonensis.
8. Palaeologus, M. II (1977). Dennis, G. T. (ed.). Epistulae. CFHB 8. Translated by Dennis, G. T. Dumbarton Oaks: Center for Byzantine Studies. — Series Washingtonensis.
9. Bryennius, N. (1975). Gautier, P. (ed.). Historiae. CFHB 9. Bruxelles: Byzantion. — Series Bruxellensis.
10. Schirò, G., ed. (1975). Chronica Toccorum Cephallensium. CFHB 10. Rome: Accademia Nazionale dei Lincei. — Series Italica.
11. Choniates, N. (1975). Van Dieten, J. L. (ed.). Historia. CFHB 11. Vol. I–II. Berlin: Walter de Gruyter. — Series Berolinensis.
12. Schreiner, P., ed. (1975–1979). Chronica Byzantina breviora. CFHB 12. Vol. I–III. Vienna: Österreichischen Akademie der Wissenschaften [CBB]. — 1. Einleitung und Text (1975). — 2. Historische Kommentar (1977). — 3. Teilüberzetzung und Indices (1979). — Series Vindobonensis.
13. Nicephorus (1990). Mango, C. (ed.). Historia brevis. CFHB 13. Dumbarton Oaks: Center for Byzantine Studies. — Series Washingtonensis.
14. Genesius, I. (1978). Lesmüller-Werner, A.; Thurn, I. (eds.). Regum libri quattuor. CFHB 14. Berlin: Walter de Gruyter. — Series Berolinensis.
15. Duffy, J.; Parker, J., eds. (1979). Synodicon Vetus. CFHB 15. Dumbarton Oaks: Center for Byzantine Studies. — Series Washingtonensis.
16. Theophylactus Achridensis (1980–1986). Gautier, P. (ed.). Orationes, tractatus, carmina, epistulae. CFHB 16. Vol. I–II. Thessalonica: Association de recherches byzantines. — Series Thessalonicensis.
17. Mauricius (1981). Dennis, G. T. (ed.). Strategicon. CFHB 17. Translated by Gamillscheg, E. Vienna: Österreichischen Akademie der Wissenschaften. — Series Vindobonensis.
18. Not assigned.
19. Registrum Patriarchatus Constantinopolitani [RPK]. — 1. Hunger, H.; Kresten, O., eds. (1981). Registrum Patriarchatus Constantinopolitani. CFHB 18/1. Vol. I. Vienna: Österreichischen Akademie der Wissenschaften. — 2. Hunger, H.; Kresten, O.; Kislinger, E.; Cupane, C., eds. (1995). Registrum Patriarchatus Constantinopolitani. CFHB 18/2. Vol. II. Vienna: Österreichischen Akademie der Wissenschaften. — 3. Koder, J.; Hinterberger, M.; Kresten, O., eds. (2001). Registrum Patriarchatus Constantinopolitani. CFHB 18/3. Vol. III. Vienna: Österreichischen Akademie der Wissenschaften. — Series Vindobonensis.
20. Nicholas I (1981). Westerink, L. G. (ed.). Opuscula diversa. CFHB 20. Dumbarton Oaks: Center for Byzantine Studies. — Series Washingtonensis.
21. Acyndinus, G. (1983). Hero, A. C. (ed.). Epistulae. CFHB 21. Dumbarton Oaks: Center for Byzantine Studies. — Series Washingtonensis.
22. Critobulus Imbriota (1983). Reinsch, D. R. (ed.). Historiae. CFHB 22. Berlin: Walter de Gruyter. — Series Berolinensis.
23. Leo (1985). Vinson, M. P. (ed.). Epistulae. CFHB 23. Dumbarton Oaks: Center for Byzantine Studies. — Series Washingtoniensis.
24. Pachymeres, G. (1984–2000). Failler, A. (ed.). Relationes historicae. CFHB 23. Vol. I–V. Translated by Laurent, V.; Failler, A. Paris: Les Belles Lettres; [then] Institute français d'études byzantines. — Series Parisiensis.
25. Dennis, G. T., ed. (1985). Three Byzantine Military Treatises. CFHB 25. Translated by Dennis, G. T. Dumbarton Oaks: Center for Byzantine Studies. — Series Washingtoniensis.
26. Palaeologus, M. II (1985). Chrisostomides, J. (ed.). Funeral Oration on his Brother Theodore. CFHB 16. Vol. I–II. Thessalonica: Association for Byzantine Research. — Series Thessalonicensis.
27. Ephraem Aenius (1990). Lampsidis, O. (ed.). Historia Chronica. CFHB 27. Athens: Academia Atheniensis. — Series Atheniensis.
28. Porphyrogenitus, C. (1990). Haldon, J. F.; Antonopoulou, Th. (eds.). Tres tractatus de expeditionibus militaribus imperatoris. CFHB 28. Vienna: Österreichischen Akademie der Wissenschaften. — Series Vindoboniensis.
29. Sphrantzes, G. (1990). Maisano, R. (ed.). Historia. CFHB 29. Rome: Accademia Nazionale dei Lincei. — Series Italica.
30. Psellus, M. (1990). Aerts, W. J. (ed.). Historia syntomos. CFHB 30. Berlin – New York: Walter de Gruyter. — Series Berolinensis.
31. Theodorus Studita (1992). Fatouros, G. (ed.). Epistulae. CFHB 30. Berlin – New York: Walter de Gruyter. — Series Berolinensis.
32. Eustathius Thessalonicensis (2000). Wirth, P. (ed.). Opera minora. CFHB 32. Berlin – New York: Walter de Gruyter. — Series Berolinensis.
33. Leo Sapiens (1991). Koder, J. (ed.). Liber Praefecti. CFHB 33. Vienna: Österreichischen Akademie der Wissenschaften. — Series Vindobonensis.
34. Mauropus, I. (1990). Karpozilos, A. (ed.). Epistulae. CFHB 34. Thessalonica: Association for Byzantine Research. — Series Thessalonicensis.
35. Malalas, I. (2000). Thurn, J. (ed.). Chronographia. CFHB 35. Berlin – Boston: Walter de Gruyter. — Series Berolinensis.
36. Constantinus Manasses (1996). Lampsidis, O. (ed.). Breviarium Chronicum. CFHB 36. Vol. I–II. Athens: Academia Atheniensis. — Series Atheniensis.
37. Professor anonymus (2000). Markopoulos, A. (ed.). Epistulae. CFHB 37. Berlin – New York: Walter de Gruyter. — Series Berolinensis.
38. Demetrius Chomatenus (2002). Prinzig, G. (ed.). Ponemata diaphora. CFHB 38. Berlin – New York: Walter de Gruyter. — Series Berolinensis.
39. Ignatius Diaconus (1997). Mango, C.; Eftymiadis, St. (eds.). Epistulae. CFHB 39. Dumbarton Oaks: Center for Byzantine Studies. — Series Washingtoniensis.
40. Komnene, A. (2001). Kambylis, A.; Reinsch, D. R. (eds.). Alexias. CFHB 40. Vol. I–II. Berlin – New York: Walter de Gruyter. — Series Berolinensis.
41. Choniates, M. (2001). Kolovou, F. (ed.). Epistulae. CFHB 41. Berlin – New York: Walter de Gruyter. — Series Berolinensis.
42. Theophanes Continuatus (2012). Ševčenko, I. (ed.). Vita Basilii imperatoris. CFHB 42. Berlin – New York: Walter de Gruyter. — Series Berolinensis.
43. Stephanus Byzantius (2006–2017). Billerbeck, M. (ed.). Ethnika. CFHB 43. Vol. I–V. Berlin – New York: Walter de Gruyter. — Series Berolinensis.
44. Symeon Logothetes (2006). Wahlgren, S. (ed.). Chronicon. CFHB 44. Vol. I. Berlin – New York: Walter de Gruyter. — Series Berolinensis.
45. Eustathius Thessalonicensis (2006). Metzler, K. (ed.). De emendanda vita monachica. CFHB 45. Berlin – New York: Walter de Gruyter. — Series Berolinensis.
46. Scutariota, Th. (2015). Tocci, R. (ed.). Chronica. CFHB 46. Berlin – New York: Walter de Gruyter. — Series Berolinensis.
47. Ioannes Antiochenus (2008). Mariev, S. (ed.). Fragmenta. CFHB 47. Berlin – New York: Walter de Gruyter. — Series Berolinensis.
48. Theodorus Cyzicensis (2010). Tziatiz-Papagianni, M. (ed.). Epistulae. CFHB 47. Berlin – New York: Walter de Gruyter. — Series Berolinensis.
49. Leo VI (2010). Dennis, G. T.; Duffy, J. (eds.). Taktika. CFHB 49. Translated by Smithies, A. Dumbarton Oaks: Center for Byzantine Studies. — Series Washingtoniensis
50. Attaliates, M. (2011). Tsolakis, E. Th. (ed.). HIstoria. CFHB 50. Athens: Academia Atheniensis. — Series Atheniensis.
51. Nicetas David (2013). Smithies, A.; Duffy, J. (eds.). The Life of the Patriarch Ignatius. CFHB 51. Translated by Smithies, A. Dumbarton Oaks: Center for Byzantine Studies. — Series Washingtoniensis.
52. Porphyrogenitus, C. (2020). Dagron, G.; Flusin, B.; Bondoux, R.; Feissel, D.; Grélois, J.-P.; Stavrou, M.; Zuckerman, C. (eds.). Liber de ceremoniis. CFHB 52/1–5. Vol. I–V. Paris: Association des Amis du Centre d’Histoire et Civilisation de Byzance. — Series Parisiensis.
53. Theophanes Continuatus (2015). Featherstone, J. M.; Signes Codoñer, J. (eds.). Chronographia. Libri I–IV. CFHB 53. Berlin – New York: Walter de Gruyter. — Series Berolinensis.
54. Gregorius Antiochus (2021). Sideras, A. (ed.). Opera omnia. CFHB 54. Vienna: Österreichischen Akademie der Wissenschaften. — Series Vindobonensis.
55. Leo Diaconus (2027). Panagiotakes, N. M.; Markopoulos, A. (eds.). Historiae. CFHB 55. Berlin – New York: Walter de Gruyter. — Series Berolinensis.
56. Polemis, I. D.; Antonopoulou, Th., eds. (2021). Vita et miracula sancti Christoduli Patmensis. CFHB 56. Vienna: Österreichischen Akademie der Wissenschaften. — Series Vindobonensis.
57. Nicephorus Callisti Xanthopulus (2022). Berger, A. (ed.). Historia Ecclesiastica. CFHB 57/1. Vol. I. Vienna: Österreichischen Akademie der Wissenschaften.
58. Theophanes Continuatus (2025). Featherstone, J. M.; Signes Codoñer, J. (eds.). Chronographia. Liber VI. CFHB 58. Berlin – New York: Walter de Gruyter. — Series Berolinensis.
59. Doukas (2026). Kotzabassi, S. (ed.). Historia. CFHB 59. Berlin – New York: Walter de Gruyter. — Series Berolinensis.

== Supplementa Byzantina ==
In addition to the CFHB, there exists a companion series called "Supplementa Byzantina" (SuByz) aimed at publishing monographs on all fields of Byzantine studies, including critical editions of texts of not necessarily historical interest.

=== Published volumes ===
1. Theodoros Stoudites (1968). Speck, P. (ed.). Jamben auf verschiedene Gegenstände. SuByz 1. Berlin: Walter de Gruyter.
2. Van Dieten, J.-L. (1971). Niketas Choniates: Erläuterungen zu den Reden und Briefen nebst einer Biographie. SuByz 2. Berlin: Walter de Gruyter.
3. Symeon Neos Theologos (1976). Kambylis, A. (ed.). Hymnen. SuByz 3. Berlin: Walter de Gruyter.
4. Caratzas, St. C. (1976). Les Tzacones. SuByz 4. Berlin: Walter de Gruyter.
5. Eideneier, H., ed. (1977). Spanos: Eine byzantinische Satire als Parodie. SuByz 5. Berlin: Walter de Gruyter.
6. Leon Magistros Choirosphaktes (2002). Vassis, I. (ed.). Chiliostichos Theologia. Editio princeps. SuByz 6. Berlin – New York: Walter de Gruyter.
7. Moennig, U., ed. (2004). Die Erzählung von Alexander und Semiramis. SuByz 7. Berlin – New York: Walter de Gruyter.
8. Vassis, I. (2005). Initia carminum Byzantinorum. SuByz 8. Berlin – New York: Walter de Gruyter.
  - Vassis, I. (2026). Initia carminum Byzantinorum. SuByz 8 (2nd ed.). Berlin – New York: Walter de Gruyter.
9. Metzler, K. (2006). Eustathios von Thessalonike und das Mönchtum. Untersuchungen und Kommentar zur Schrift "De emendanda vita monachica". SuByz 9. Berlin – New York: Walter de Gruyter.
10. Eustathius Thessalonicensis (2014). Cesaretti, P.; Ronchey, S. (eds.). Exegesis in canonem iambicum Pentecostalem. SuByz 10. Berlin – New York: Walter de Gruyter.
11. Kambylis, A. (2020). Kolovou, F.; Prinzig, G. (eds.). Graeca — Byzantina — Neograeca. SuByz 11. Berlin – New York: Walter de Gruyter.
12. Billerbeck, M.; Neumann-Hartmann, A. (2021). Stephanos von Byzanz: Grammatiker und Lexikograph. SuByz 12. Berlin – New York: Walter de Gruyter.
13. De Gregorio, G.; Prinzig, G.; Tocci, R., eds. (2025). Folia Byzantina: Schrift- und Buchkultur in Byzanz und in der Frühen Neuzeit. Festschrift zu Ehren von Erich Lamberz. SuByz 13. Berlin – New York: Walter de Gruyter.

== See also ==
- Corpus Scriptorum Historiae Byzantinae
- Monumenta Germaniae Historica
