= Judith Herrin =

British archaeologist (born 1942)

Judith Herrin FSA
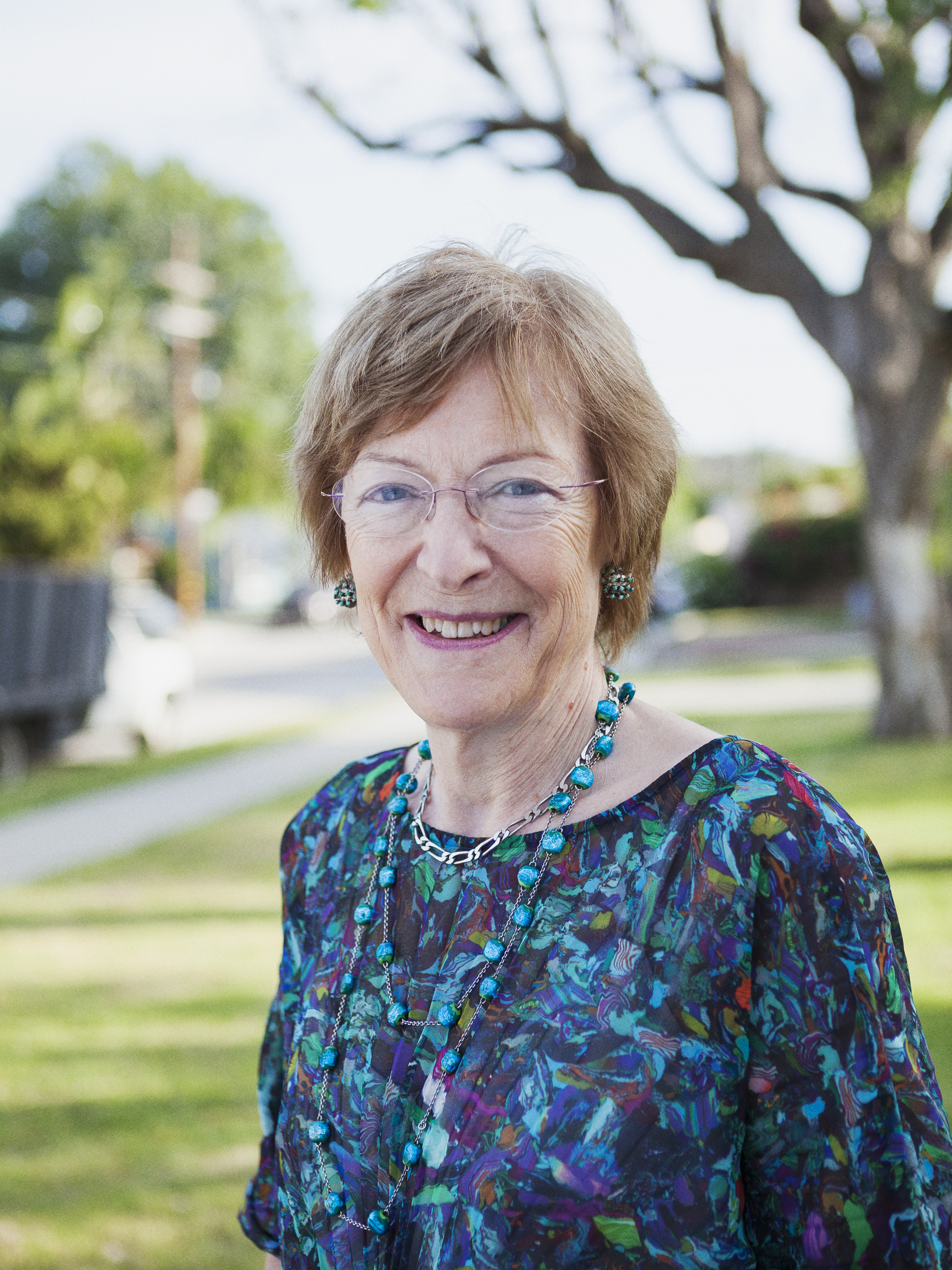
- Herrin in 2016
- Born: 1942 (age 83–84)
- Partner: Anthony Barnett
- Awards: Heineken Prize for History (2016); Duff Cooper Prize (2020)

Academic background
- Education: Newnham College, Cambridge (BA); University of Birmingham (PhD)
- Thesis: The Social and Economic Structure of Central Greece in the Late Twelfth Century (1972)

Academic work
- Discipline: Byzantine studies
- Institutions: Princeton University; King's College London

Judith Herrin (/ˈhɛrɪn/; born 1942) is an English archaeologist, Byzantinist, and historian of Late Antiquity. She was a professor of Late Antique and Byzantine studies and the Constantine Leventis Senior Research Fellow at King's College London (now emerita).

== Early life and education ==
Herrin attended Bedales School. She then studied history at Newnham College, Cambridge, and was awarded her Ph.D. in 1972 from the University of Birmingham. She trained in Paris, Athens and Munich.

== Career ==
Herrin worked as an archaeologist with the British School at Athens and on the site of Kalenderhane Mosque in Istanbul as a Dumbarton Oaks fellow. Between 1991 and 1995, she was Stanley J. Seeger Professor in Byzantine History, Princeton University. She was appointed Professor of Late Antique and Byzantine Studies at King's College London (KCL) in 1995, and was head of the Center for Hellenic Studies at KCL. She retired from the post in 2008, becoming Professor Emeritus. She was president of the International Congress of Byzantine Studies in 2011.

In 2016, Herrin won the Dr A.H. Heineken Prize for History.

Herrin's book Ravenna: Capital of Empire, Crucible of Europe was awarded the Duff Cooper Prize for 2020. It was shortlisted for the 2021 Wolfson History Prize.

== Critical reception ==
In 2013, G.W. Bowersock said in a New York Review of Books (NYRB) article that The Formation of Christendom had since its publication in 1987 meant "many historians suddenly discovered that early medieval Christianity was far more complex than they had ever imagined". Her book Unrivalled Influence: Women and Empire in Byzantium with its "comparative perspective on Byzantium, European Christendom, and Islam reflects a lifetime of distinguished work on the Byzantine Empire."

Byzantium: The Surprising Life of a Medieval Empire (2007) was similarly well received by academic historians writing in the UK broadsheet press. Norman Stone commented in The Guardian: "Herrin is excellent on the Ravenna of Justinian, with the extraordinary mosaics that somehow survived the second world war (when Allied bombing could be ruthless) and she is very good on that odd Byzantine (and Russian) phenomenon, the woman in power". He concluded "Judith Herrin can work her way into the mind of Byzantium, and she gives prominence especially to the artistic side. A very good book, all in all." In The Daily Telegraph, Noel Malcolm stated: "her general readers will mostly be people whose history lessons at school have left them thinking in terms of a West-centred sequence: 'Rome – Dark Ages – Middle Ages – Renaissance'. Their brains need some re-calibrating if they are to understand the rather different pattern of development that took place in the 'Rome of the East'; and that is the task which Judith Herrin has now performed, deftly and with much learning lightly worn".

== Honours ==
- Dr A.H. Heineken Prize for History (2016) for her pioneering research into medieval cultures in Mediterranean civilisations and for establishing the crucial significance of the Byzantine Empire in history.
- Golden Cross of the Order of Honour for services to Hellenism by the president of the Hellenic Republic of Greece (2002)
- Medal from the College de France (2000)
- Vice-Chairman of the Editorial Board, Past & Present
- Member of the Governing Board of the Warburg Institute, University of London (1995–2001)
- University of London appointed Governor of Camden School for Girls (1995–2002)
- Fellow of the Society of Antiquaries
- Member, British Academy Committee for the Prosopography of the Byzantine Empire
- Member, British Committee for the Reunification of the Parthenon Marbles

== Selected bibliography ==
- Ravenna. Capital of Empire, Crucible of Europe (Penguin Random House/Princeton University Press, 2020) ISBN 978-1-84614-466-0, 978-0-691-20197-9
- Ravenna, its role in earlier medieval change and exchange, edited with Jinty Nelson, (Institute of Historical Research, London, 2016) ISBN 978 1 909646 14 8, E-ISBN 978 0 691 20197 9.
- Margins and Metropolis: Authority across the Byzantine Empire (Princeton University Press, 2013) ISBN 978-0-691-15301-8, E-ISBN 978-1-400-84522-4.
- Unrivalled Influence: Women and Empire in Byzantium (Princeton University Press, 2013) ISBN 978-0-691-15321-6, E-ISBN 978-1-400-84521-7.
- Byzantium: The Surprising Life of a Medieval Empire (Allen Lane, the Penguin Press, London, 2007; Princeton University Press, Princeton, 2008) ISBN 978-0-691-13151-1, Greek, Italian, Japanese, Korean, Polish, Spanish, Swedish, and Turkish translations (2009–11), Princeton paperback ISBN 978-0-691-14369-9.
- Personification in the Greek World, eds Emma Stafford and Judith Herrin (Ashgate: Aldershot 2005) ISBN 978-0-7546-5031-7.
- Porphyrogenita: Essays on the History and Literature of Byzantium and the Latin East in Honour of Julian Chrysostomides, eds J. Herrin, Ch. Dendrinos, E. Harvalia-Crook, J. Harris (Publications for the Centre of Hellenic Studies, King's College London. Aldershot 2003). ISBN 978-0-7546-3696-0.
- Mosaic. Byzantine and Cypriot Studies in Honour of A.H.S. Megaw, eds. J. Herrin, M. Mullett, C. Otten-Froux (Supplementary Volume to the Annual of the British School at Athens, 2001) ISBN 0-904887-40-5.
- Women in Purple. Rulers of Medieval Byzantium (Weidenfeld and Nicolson, 2001, Princeton University Press, 2002) ISBN 978-1-84212-529-8 [on Irene (empress), Euphrosyne (9th century) and Theodora (9th century)]. Spanish translation (2002), Greek translation (2003), Czech translation (2004), Polish translation (2006).
- A Medieval Miscellany (Weidenfeld and Nicolson, 1999) ISBN 978-0-670-89377-5, Dutch and Spanish translations (2000).
- The Formation of Christendom (Princeton University Press and Basil Blackwell, 1987). Revised, illustrated paperback edition (Princeton University Press and Fontana, London, 1989), reissued by Phoenix Press, London, 2001, ISBN 978-1-84212-179-5.
- Constantinople in the Early Eighth Century: The Parastaseis Syntomoi Chronikai, Introduction, Translation and Commentary, edited with Averil Cameron. Columbia Studies in the Classical Tradition, vol. X (Leiden, 1984). ISBN 90-04-07010-9.
- Iconoclasm, edited with Anthony Bryer (Centre for Byzantine Studies, University of Birmingham, 1977). ISBN 0-7044-0226-2.
