= Maria Mavroudi =

Historian of Byzantine history

- Born: 1967 (age 58–59)
- Awards: MacArthur Fellowship

Academic background
- Education: Anatolia College, University of Thessaloniki, Harvard University
- Thesis: The So-called Oneirocriticon of Achmet: A Byzantine Book on Dream Interpretation and Its Arabic Sources (1998)
- Doctoral advisor: Ihor Ševčenko

Academic work
- Discipline: Byzantine studies, history, philology
- Institutions: University of California, Berkeley

Maria V. Mavroudi (born 1967) is a Greek-born American Byzantinist, historian, and philologist. She is a history professor at University of California, Berkeley.

== Education ==
Mavroudi graduated from Anatolia College in Thessaloniki, Greece; from the University of Thessaloniki with a Philology degree; and from Harvard University with a PhD in 1998 Byzantine Studies. Her doctoral advisor was Ihor Ševčenko.

== Career ==
She researches the recycling of the ancient tradition between Byzantium and Islam; Byzantine intellectual history; and the survival and transformation of Byzantine culture after 1453, along with other various topics.

Fluent in classical Greek and Arabic, she also understands Coptic, Latin, and Syriac, and speaks Modern Greek, French, and English fluently. She formerly taught at Princeton University.

== Awards ==
- 2004, MacArthur Fellowship

== Works ==
- Mavroudi, Maria V. (1998). The So-called Oneirocriticon of Achmet: A Byzantine Book on Dream Interpretation and Its Arabic Sources (dissertation). Harvard University.
- Mavroudi, Maria V. (2002). A Byzantine Book on Dream Interpretation: The Oneirocriticon of Achmet and Its Arabic Sources. Volume 36 of Medieval Mediterranean. Brill. ISBN 9789004120792.
- The Occult Sciences in Byzantium, Editors Paul Magdalino, Maria V. Mavroudi, La Pomme d'or, 2006, ISBN 978-954-8446-02-0
- "Theodore Hyrtakenos' Description of the Garden of St. Anna and the Ekphrasis of Gardens", Byzantine garden culture, Editors Antony Robert Littlewood, Henry Maguire, Joachim Wolschke-Bulmahn, Dumbarton Oaks, 2002, ISBN 978-0-88402-280-0
