= August Immanuel Bekker =

German classical scholar and philologist (1785–1871)

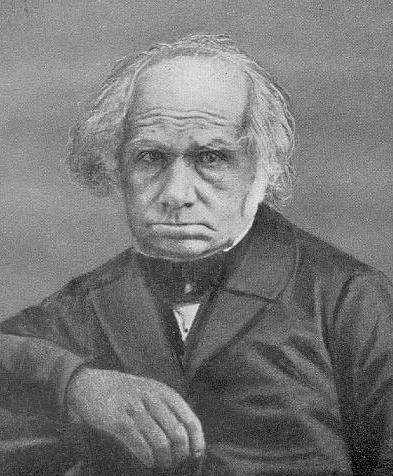
- Born: August Immanuel Bekker; 21 May 1785
- Died: 7 June 1871 (aged 86)
- Education: University of Halle

August Immanuel Bekker (21 May 1785 – 7 June 1871) was a German philologist and critic.

== Biography ==
Born in Berlin, Bekker completed his classical education at the University of Halle under Friedrich August Wolf, who considered him as his most promising pupil. In 1810 he was appointed professor of philosophy in the University of Berlin. For several years, between 1810 and 1821, he travelled in France, Italy, England and parts of Germany, examining classical manuscripts and gathering materials for his great editorial labours.

Some of the fruits of his researches were published in the Anecdota Graeca (3 vols, 1814–1821), but the major results are to be found in the enormous array of classical authors edited by him. His industry extended to nearly the whole of Greek literature with the exception of the tragedians and lyric poets. His best known editions are those of Plato (1816–1823), Oratores Attici (1823–1824), Aristotle (1831–1836), Aristophanes (1829), and twenty-five volumes of the Corpus Scriptorum Historiae Byzantinae. The only Latin authors edited by him were Livy (1829–1830) and Tacitus (1831).

Bekker confined himself entirely to manuscript investigations and textual criticism; he contributed little to the extension of other types of scholarship. Bekker numbers have become the standard way of referring to the works of Aristotle and the Corpus Aristotelicum. He was elected a Foreign Honorary Member of the American Academy of Arts and Sciences in 1861. He died in Berlin aged 86.

== Works ==
- Ducas, Michael, Ducae : Michaelis Ducae Nepotis Historia Byzantina, ed. by Bekker, August Immanuel (Bonn: Weber, 1834).
- Khoniátis, Nikítas, Narrative of Events after the Capture of the City [by the Franks], ed. by Bekker, August Immanuel (Bonn: Weber, 1835).
- Phrantzis, G., Chronicon, ed. by Bekker, August Immanuel (Bonn: Weber, 1838).
- Khalkokondhýlis, ‘Laónikos' (i.e. Nikólaos), De Origine et Rebus Gestis Turcarum, ed. by Bekker, August Immanuel (Bonn: Weber, 1843).
- Attaleiátis, Michael, Historia, ed. by Bekker, August Immanuel (Bonn: Weber, 1853).
