= Karl Wilhelm Dindorf =

German classical philologist (1802–1883)

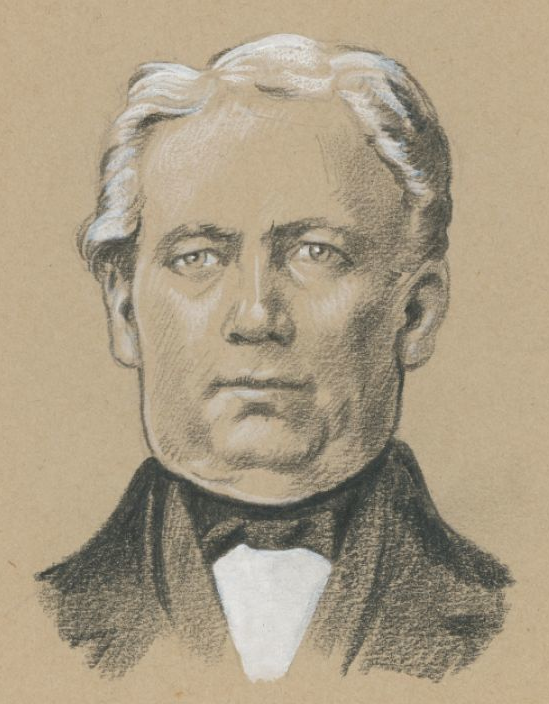
- Born: Karl Wilhelm Dindorf; 2 January 1802; Leipzig, Electorate of Saxony, Holy Roman Empire
- Died: 1 August 1883 (aged 81); Leipzig, Kingdom of Saxony, German Empire

Academic background
- Education: Leipzig University

Karl Wilhelm Dindorf (Latin: Guilielmus Dindorfius; 2 January 1802 – 1 August 1883) was a German classical scholar. He was born and died at Leipzig.

From his earliest years he showed a strong taste for classical studies, and after completing F. Invernizi's edition of Aristophanes at an early age, and editing several grammarians and rhetoricians, he was in 1828 appointed extraordinary professor of literary history in his native city. Disappointed at not obtaining the ordinary professorship when it became vacant in 1833, he resigned his post in the same year, and devoted himself entirely to study and literary work.

His attention had at first been chiefly given to Athenaeus, whom he edited in 1827, and to the Greek dramatists, all of whom he edited separately and combined in his Poetae scenici Graeci (1830 and later editions). He also wrote a work on the metres of the Greek dramatic poets, and compiled special lexicons to Aeschylus and Sophocles. He produced an edition of Sophoclean Scholia which he intended as a supplement to Elmsley's edition of Sophoclean scholia vetera. He edited Procopius for Niebuhr's Corpus of the Byzantine writers, and between 1846 and 1851 brought out at Oxford an important edition of Demosthenes; he also edited Lucian and Josephus for the Didot classics, while his work on Homeric scholarship is represented by his four-volume edition of the Homeric scholia.

His last important editorial labour was his work on Eusebius of Caesarea (1867–1871). Much of his attention was occupied by the re-publication of Stephanus's Thesaurus (Paris, 1831–1865), chiefly executed by him and his brother Ludwig, a work of prodigious labour and utility. His reputation suffered somewhat through the imposture practised upon him by the Greek Constantine Simonides, who succeeded in deceiving him by a fabricated fragment of the Greek historian Uranius. The book was printed, and a few copies had been circulated, when the forgery was discovered, just in time to prevent its being given to the world under the auspices of the University of Oxford. Shortly after the death of his brother, he lost all his property and his library by rash speculations.

== Ludwig Dindorf ==
His brother Ludwig August Dindorf (Latin: Ludovicus Dindorfius; Leipzig, 3 January 1805 – 6 September 1871, Leipzig) never held any academic position, and led so secluded a life that many doubted his existence, and declared that he was a mere pseudonym. The important share which he took in the edition of the Thesaurus is nevertheless authenticated by his own signature to his contributions. He also published valuable editions of Polybius, Dio Cassius, and other Greek historians.
