= Dionysios Zakythinos =

Greek academic, historian and politician (1905–1993)

Dionysios A. Zakythinos or Zakythenos (Greek: Διονύσιος Α. Ζακυθηνός; 1905 in Lixouri, Kefalonia – 18 January 1993, in Athens) was a leading Greek Byzantinist.

== Biography ==
Zakythinos was born in Kefalonia in 1905. After graduating from the University of Athens in 1927, he went to the Sorbonne, which at the time was a major center of Byzantine studies with scholars like Charles Diehl and Ferdinand Lot. His first major work was a detailed study of the late Byzantine Despotate of the Morea, published in French (Le despotat grec de Morée (1262–1460)) in two volumes, one in 1932 and the other, delayed by World War II, in 1953. From 1939 to 1970, he taught Byzantine and Modern Greek History in the University of Athens (among his students were Angeliki Laiou, Nikolaos Oikonomides, and Chryssa Maltezou), while in 1937–1946, he directed the Greek State Archives. He also taught modern Greek history in the Panteion University from 1951 to 1965, served as vice-chairman of the National Research Foundation in 1958, and was the first director of the Byzantine Research Institute from its foundation in 1960 to 1975. The Academy of Athens elected him as a full member in 1966, and Zakythinos went on to serve as its president in 1974. Zakythinos was also a Foreign Fellow of the British Academy. In 1971–76, he served as chairman of the International Association of Byzantine Studies (AIEB), and thereafter as its honorary president.

Zakythinos also served briefly as Minister to the Prime Minister in the interim 1963–64 government of Ioannis Paraskevopoulos, while after the fall of the Regime of the Colonels, he was elected to the Greek Parliament in the November 1974 elections, on the list of the conservative New Democracy party, serving until 1977. He died on 18 January 1993 in Athens.

== Sources ==
- Anthony Bryer (5 February 1993). "Obituary: Professor Dionysios Zakythinos". The Independent.
