= Athanasios Angelou =

Greek Byzantine literature professor

Athanasios Angelou (Greek: Αθανάσιος Αγγέλου) is a Greek university teacher of Byzantine Literature, and has served as Dean of the School of Philosophy at the University of Ioannina and artistic director of cultural presentations.

== Biographical ==
He was born on October 2, 1951. He completed his schooling at Athens College in 1970. He studied philosophy and classical philology at the Yale University in the United States, gaining a Bachelor of Arts degree (BA) cum laude. From 1974 to 1975 he attended classes in philosophy at the Paris-Sorbonne University under Ferdinand Alquié and Yvon Belaval. After 1975 he turned to Byzantine studies and in 1981 he received a Doctorate at the University of London having prepared his thesis under the guidance of the British Byzantinist, Robert Browning, on Nicholas of Methone's Refutation of the Elements of Theology, a 12th-century philosophical and theological response to the Neoplatonist philosopher Proclus.

For the next eight years of his time in England he taught Byzantine Literature and Greek Palaeography at Birkbeck, King's and Royal Holloway Colleges as well as at the Institute of Classical Studies, University of London. In 1985 he founded with Julian Chrysostomides and Joseph A. Munitiz the Byzantine Literature Seminar at the Warburg Institute of London University which brought together the interests of many students and researchers. In 1987 on the initiative of Jonathan Riley-Smith, Julian Chrysostomides and Athanasios Angelou the joint diploma / MA programme in Byzantine Studies was established at Royal Holloway College.

In 1989 he returned to Greece to take up his post as assistant professor of Byzantine Literature at the University of Ioannina. From 1995 he has been associate professor at the same university. He undertook administrative duties as Chairman of the Department of Philology from 2005 to 2009 and as Dean of the School of Philosophy from 2008 to 2013.

=== Research activities ===
His research interests focus upon Byzantine rhetoric and the history of Late Byzantine literature. In particular he has been engaged with the Histories of Niketas Choniates and John Kantakouzenos, examining questions which relate to the structure and organisation of the works. Especially, among other things, he has occupied himself with the personality and thought of Gennadios Scholarios, giving emphasis to the use in his work of the word "Hellene, as well as to the position which the event of the Fall of Constantinople in 1453 took in his thought.

=== Cultural activities ===
He has also developed extensive activities in the artistic field. Through a series of presentations combining music, words and images, he aimed to project Byzantium not only as geographical space but also as a synthesis of musical and literary phenomena in the tradition of the Greek East. He has collaborated with the musical ensemble En Chordais of Thessaloniki and Kyriakos Kalaitzides, the actors Dimitri Kataleipho, Lydia Koniordou, Karyofyllia Karampeti, Moni Ovadia, Alan Bates, the singers Melihat Gülses from Turkey, the Lebanese Ghada Shbeir and musicians from Turkey, Lebanon, Italy and England with performances in London, Brussels, Venice (Saint Mark's Basilica), Athens and Plovdiv. The concert of religious music organised with the English musician, Guy Prothero, in St Paul's Cathedral was attended by Charles, Prince of Wales, and reported in the leading article of The Times newspaper. The artistic exhibition in Venice was televised with a special dedication by the Greek state television (ET3), while the performance "Resonance World Wide" at the Megaron Concert Hall Athens 2006 was televised by ET1.

== Cultural presentations ==
- Byzantine Festival in London (with Guy Prothero), St Paul's Cathedral, Hellenic Centre London, 1998. στον κύκλο Σταυροδρόμια, Μέγαρο Μουσικής Αθηνών, 2000.
- Sounds from the Byzantine East, in the cycle Crossroads, Megaron Concert Hall Athens, 2000.
- Memory of Byzantium, Basilica of San Marco, Palazzo Querini Stampalia and Fondazione Giorgio Cini, Venice, 2001.
- Voice of Byzantium, Palais des Beaux-Arts, Brussels, 2003.
- Resonance World Wide, Byzantium and the Greek East, Megaron Concert Hall Athens, 2006.

== Publications ==
- Nicholas of Methone, Refutation of Proclus' Elements of Theology. A Critical Edition with an Introduction on Nicholas' Life and works, Athens/Leiden, Academy of Athens/E. J. Brill, 1984.
- Manuel Palaiologos, Dialogue with the Empress - Mother on Marriage. Introduction, Text and Translation, Vienna, Academie der Wissenschaft, Vienna 1991.
- «Ο Γεννάδιος Σχολάριος και η Άλωση», στο Η Άλωση της Πόλης επιμ. Ευάγγελος Χρυσός, 2η εκδ. Αθήνα, Εκδόσεις Ακρίτα, 1994.
- "Who am I?" Scholarios' answers and the Hellenic identity», in Φιλέλλην. Studies in honour of Robert Browning, Venice 1996, p. 1-19.
- «Rhetoric and History: The case of Nicetas Choniates', in History as Literature in Byzantium, ed. Ruth Macrides, Farnham, Ashgate 2010, p. 289-305.
- «Subversion and Duplicity in the Histories of John Kantakouzenos», in Power and Subversion in Byzantium, ed. Dimiter Angelov, Farnham, Ashgate 2013, p. 263-279.
- «Word and Deed: Types of Narrative in Kantakouzenos's Histories», in Pour une poétique de Byzance. Hommage à Vassilis Katsaros, ed. S. Efthymiadis, Charis Messis, P. Odorico, I. Polemis, Paris 2015, p. 57-74.

== See also ==
- Who's who in the World 2011, 28th ed. New Providence, Marquis Who's Who, 2010, p. 91.
- Who's who στην Ελλάδα, 3^{η} η εκδ. Ελβετία, Who's Who της Hübner, Έκδοση Εγκυκλοπαιδειών Προσωπικότητων, 2008, σ. 30.
