= Julian Chrysostomides =

Greek historian

- Born: Iouliane Chrysostomides; 21 April 1928; Istanbul, Turkey
- Died: 18 October 2008 (aged 80)
- Education: St. Anne's College, Oxford
- Occupation: Historian
- Years active: 1965–2008

Julian (Iouliane) Chrysostomides (Greek: Ιουλιανή Χρυσοστομίδη; 21 April 1928 – 18 October 2008) was a Greek historian of Istanbul. She lectured at Royal Holloway, University of London for nearly 30 years, and was instrumental in establishing it as a centre of Byzantine studies. She served for ten years as director of the Hellenic Institute at Royal Holloway, University of London, transforming it into a centre for interdisciplinary research into Greek and Byzantine history.

== Early life and education ==
Julian was the daughter of Cappadocian entrepreneur Chrysostomos Chrysostomides and his wife, Victoria, née Rizas, a phanariot. Her early education took place at the Zappeion School, a girls' Greek lyceum in Istanbul, and she initially pursued university education at the Sorbonne. Discouraged by the rising anti-Greek sentiment in Istanbul, she moved to England in 1950 to pursue a degree in Literae humaniores at St Anne's College, Oxford, from which she graduated in 1955. That year she began a BLitt at Royal Holloway under Professor Joan Hussey, writing on Emperor Manuel II Palaeologus and his policy towards the Ottomans. She became a naturalised citizen of the UK.

== Career ==
In 1965 Chrysostomides was appointed lecturer in history at Royal Holloway College. In 1983 she became senior lecturer and in 1992 reader in Byzantine history. She retired in 1993. Throughout her career she published on Byzantine history and historiography, political theory, economy, and society. Her publications explored Byzantine women, Venetian commercial activities in the Byzantine empire, Byzantine perceptions of war and peace, and the rise of the Ottomans. Among her major contributions were the critical edition and translation of Manuel II Palaeologus's Funeral Oration on his Brother Theodore (1985), and the edited sources collected in Monumenta Peloponnesiaca (1995). She also produced a number of volumes in co-operation with other scholars, including The Letter of the Three Patriarchs to Emperor Theophilos (with Joseph Munitiz and others, 1997), The Greek Islands and the Sea (with Charalambos Dendrinos and Jonathan Harris, 2004), ‘Sweet Land …’: Lectures on the History and Culture of Cyprus (with Charalambos Dendrinos, 2006), and a Catalogue of the Greek Manuscripts in Lambeth Palace Library (with John Barron and others, 2006).

Chrysostomides was also active in encouraging postgraduate students: with Joseph Munitiz and Athanasios Angelou, she established Britain’s first postgraduate seminar on editing Byzantine texts, and with Angelou and Jonathan Riley-Smith, established a MA program in Late Antique and Byzantine Studies at Royal Holloway. In 1998 she became director of the Hellenic Institute at Royal Holloway. In her ten years as director she reorganized the institute, establishing it as an interdisciplinary research centre for the study of the history of Greece and Byzantium, and raising funds to establish lectureships, fellowships, graduate studentships, and bursaries. In 1999, the Greek state bestowed on her the title of Ambassador of Hellenism in recognition of her long services to Hellenism and her contribution to Byzantine studies.

== Death ==
Julian Chrysostomides died on 18 October 2008 after a seven-month battle with cancer. Her funeral took place on 1 November 2008 at St Sophia's Cathedral, London, attended by representatives of Greece and the Republic of Cyprus as well as her former students, colleagues and friends. Joseph Munitiz provided the funeral oration. She is survived by her adopted son John, younger son of her twin brother Nikos.
