= Ihor Ševčenko =

Polish–Ukrainian philologist (1922–2009)

Ihor Ševčenko (Ukrainian: Ігор Іванович Шевченко; 10 September 1922 – 26 December 2009) was a Polish-born philologist and historian of Ukrainian origin. He was a Byzantinist and paleo-Slavic professor of classical philology at Harvard University. He died 26 December 2009, in Cambridge, Massachusetts.

== Biography ==
Ševčenko was born in Radość near Warsaw, Poland of Ukrainian parents and was educated at the Adam Mickiewicz Gymnasium and Lycaeum in Warsaw, the Deutsche Karlsuniversität in Prague, the Université Catholique de Louvain, and the Foundation Byzantine of Professor Henri Grégoire (as member of the Seminar) in Brussels. His work reflects the influence of the numerous scholarly traditions he encountered via this education, and the multiple source languages from which he was able to draw: he learned Greek and Latin at the Gymnasium in Warsaw, encountered German, Czech and francophone approaches to scholarship in Prague and Brussels, and was a fluent native speaker of Ukrainian, Russian and Polish. Ševčenko later moved to the United States, where he taught at the University of California, Berkeley, the University of Michigan, Columbia University, and Harvard University, where he was Dumbarton Oaks Professor of Byzantine History and Literature emeritus until his death. He was also a member of the Advisory Board of the Collegium Artium in Kraków. During his early years in the United States, Ševčenko became acquainted with Ernst Kantorowicz, an eminent medievalist who worked on political and intellectual history. Ševčenko was married to Margaret (née Bentley) Ševčenko and to Nancy (née Patterson) Ševčenko; both marriages ended in divorce.

== Scholarship ==
Ševčenko has contributed to two connected yet distinct disciplines, Byzantine studies and Slavic studies (especially Ukrainian Studies). His work addresses Byzantine written culture and society from the Late Antique period to the 15th century and explores contact between the Slavic world and Byzantium from the medieval to the early modern period. Ševčenko has written on philology, literature, epigraphy, paleography and codicology. He was noted for the engaging, "detective novel" style of his prose, as in his famous article “The Date and Author of the So-Called Fragments of Toparcha Gothicus”, which reveals that the text considered the earliest surviving narrative source on the history of the Kievan Rus’ is a 19th-century forgery crafted by its “discoverer” and editor Carl Benedict Hase.

Ševčenko's approach was noted for its extensive engagement with primary source material, not simply as edited texts but as original manuscripts. He uses these sources to elucidate key issues in Byzantine and Slavic studies, such as the evangelizing mission of Cyril and Methodius among the Slavs, Byzantine political ideology and its reception in the Slavic world, and the Zealot uprising in 14th century Thessaloniki. His most recent publication was an edition and English translation of the only extant secular biography in Byzantine literature, that of the life of the 9th century emperor Basil I, which was written by scholars associated with Basil's grandson, Emperor Constantine VII. Basil's biography is a major source for the political and cultural history of Byzantium and its neighbors in the 9th and 10th centuries.

== Animal Farm ==
While working with displaced Ukrainian persons after World War II, Ševčenko wrote to George Orwell and received permission to translate Animal Farm into Ukrainian, one of the first translations of the book. Orwell agreed, waiving his royalties and also writing a detailed preface for the edition.

== Ševčenko's law ==
Ševčenko's law or Ševčenko's law of the dog and the forest is the tendency of historians to repeat the coverage and the work of previous historians, to the disadvantage of general historical coverage. The situation is compared to a dog and a forest. A dog going into a virgin forest picks a tree at random, and urinates against it. Despite the tree having no intrinsic outstanding attraction as an object for urinating against, other dogs subsequently entering the same forest will show a tendency to urinate against the same tree.

== Awards and honors ==
- Elected member of the American Academy of Arts and Sciences (1974)
- Elected member of the American Philosophical Society (1978)
- Antonovych prize (1999) - Scientific Award of the International Foundation of O. and T. Antonovich for the study "Ukraine between East and West".

== Publications ==
- Ihor Ševčenko, Études sur la polémique entre Théodore Métochite et Nicéphore Choumnos (1962). ASIN: B000KJ9U8O
- Ihor Ševčenko, Society and Intellectual Life in Late Byzantium (1981) ISBN 0-86078-083-X, ISBN 978-0-86078-083-0
- Ihor Ševčenko, Ideology, Letters and Culture in the Byzantine World (1982)
- Ihor Ševčenko, Byzantium and the Slavs in Letters and Culture (1991) ISBN 0-916458-12-1, ISBN 978-0-916458-12-6
- Ihor Ševčenko, Ukraine between East and West (1996) ISBN 1-895571-15-4, ISBN 978-1-895571-15-8
- Ihor Ševčenko, ed. and trans., Chronographiae Quae Theophanis Continuati Nomine Fertur Liber V Quo Vita Basilii Imperatoris Amplectitur (Corpus Fontium Historiae Byzantinae) (2011) ISBN 978-3-11-018477-8
- Zakorzeniony kosmopolita. Ihor Szewczenko w rozmowie z Łukaszem Jasiną, Lublin: Instytut Europy Środkowo-Wschodniej 2010 ISBN 978-83-60695-51-7 .
