= George Ostrogorsky =

Russian Byzantinist (1902–1976)

- Born: 19 January 1902; St. Petersburg, Russian Empire
- Died: 24 October 1976 (aged 74); Belgrade, SFR Yugoslavia
- Spouse: Fanula Papazoglu

Academic background
- Education: University of Heidelberg (PhD)
- Thesis: The Rural Tax Community of the Byzantine Empire in the Tenth Century (1921)
- Academic advisors: Karl Jaspers; Heinrich Rickert; Alfred Weber; Ludwig Curtius; Percy Ernst Schramm

Academic work
- Discipline: Byzantine studies
- Institutions: University of Belgrade; University of Breslau; Serbian Academy of Sciences and Arts

George Alexandrovich Ostrogorsky (Russian: Георгий Александрович Острогорский, romanized: Georgiy Aleksandrovich Ostrogorskiy; Serbian: Георгије Александрович Острогорски, Georgije Aleksandrovič Ostrogorski; 19 January 1902 – 24 October 1976) was a Russian-born Yugoslav historian and Byzantinist who was widely known for his achievements in Byzantine studies. He was a professor at the University of Belgrade.

== Early life and education ==
Ostrogorsky was born in Saint Petersburg, Russian Empire, the son of a secondary school principal and a writer on pedagogical subjects. His mother Aleksandra Konstantinovna Lehmann was of German-Swiss descent. His father, Aleksandar Yakovlevich Ostrogorsky, was of Jewish origin.

He completed his secondary education in a St. Petersburg classical gymnasium and thus acquired knowledge of Greek early in life. His family became a part of the White Russian émigré in the wake of the Russian Civil War (1917–1923). He began his university studies at the University of Heidelberg (1921), where he devoted himself initially to philosophy, economics, and sociology, though he also took classes in classical archaeology. His teachers included Karl Jaspers, Heinrich Rickert, Alfred Weber and Ludwig Curtius. His interest in history, especially Byzantine history, was awakened by Percy Ernst Schramm. After studying various aspects of Byzantinology in Paris (1924–25), Ostrogorsky received his doctorate from the University of Heidelberg (1927) with the dissertation The Rural Tax Community of the Byzantine Empire in the Tenth Century. He then taught as Privatdozent in Breslau from 1928 and when the German Nazis gained power in 1933, he moved to Belgrade. Ostrogorsky concerned himself with three main areas of research: economic, social, and institutional history with a focus on Byzantine peasantry, Byzantine theology, and imperial ideology, and Byzantine-Slavic relations, in particular in the Balkans.

== Career ==
Ostrogorsky taught at the University of Belgrade's Faculty of Philosophy, where he was the chair for Byzantinology.

Ostrogorsky made the Kingdom of Yugoslavia his permanent home and taught at Belgrade for 40 years until his retirement in 1973, leaving the Chair for Byzantinology to Božidar Ferjančić. He was made a Corresponding Member of the Serbian Academy of Sciences and Arts in 1946 and a regular member two years later. An Institute of Byzantinology was created within the Academy in 1948 with himself as director, a post he held until his death. He was chief editor of the Institute's house organ, the Zbornik radova Vizantološkog instituta, through its 16th volume which appeared in 1975. He also supervised the monograph series of the Institute of which the choice items were his own study Pronija (1951) and the multivolume collection of Byzantine Sources for the History of the Nations of Yugoslavia.

Ostrogorsky repaid in more than one way the hospitality he met with in his new country; he created a new generation of Yugoslav Byzantinists, broadened the horizons of Yugoslav historians by the example of his personal research, and provided for them closer contacts with the world scholarly community. Under his guidance, the Belgrade Institute became, along with Munich, Paris, and Dumbarton Oaks, a leading center of research in the field of Byzantinology. Ostrogorsky remained faithful to Belgrade to the very end, although over the years suggestions were made that he take up residence in an American or Soviet center of Byzantine studies.

His best-known work was the standard History of the Byzantine State (German: Geschichte des byzantinischen Staates), a work which saw three German editions (1940, 1952, 1963) and two editions in the English language (1st ed. 1956 (UK) and 1957 (USA), 2nd ed. 1968 (UK) and 1969 (USA)), and translations into more than 10 other languages.

Ostrogorsky died in Belgrade in 1976.

== Selected works and editions ==
- Ostrogorsky, George (1956). History of the Byzantine State. Oxford: Basil Blackwell.
  - Ostrogorsky, George (1957). History of the Byzantine State. New Brunswick: Rutgers University Press. ISBN 978-0-8135-0599-2.
  - Ostrogorsky, George (1968). History of the Byzantine State. Oxford: Basil Blackwell. ISBN 978-0-631-11070-5.
  - Ostrogorsky, George (1969). History of the Byzantine State. New Brunswick: Rutgers University Press. ISBN 978-0-8135-0599-2.
- Ostrogorsky, George (1956). "The Byzantine Emperor and the Hierarchical World Order". The Slavonic and East European Review. 35 (84): 1–14. JSTOR 4204790.
- Ostrogorsky, George (1959). "The Byzantine Empire in the World of the Seventh Century". Dumbarton Oaks Papers. 13: 1–21. doi:10.2307/1291126. JSTOR 1291126.
- Ostrogorsky, George (1959). "Byzantine Cities in the Early Middle Ages". Dumbarton Oaks Papers. 13: 45–66. doi:10.2307/1291128. JSTOR 1291128.
- Острогорски, Георгије (1965). Серска област после Душанове смрти. Београд: Научно дело.
- Ostrogorsky, George (1965). "The Byzantine Background of the Moravian Mission". Dumbarton Oaks Papers. 19: 1–18. doi:10.2307/1291223. JSTOR 1291223.
- Ostrogorsky, George (1971). "Observations on the Aristocracy in Byzantium". Dumbarton Oaks Papers. 25: 1–32. doi:10.2307/1291302. JSTOR 1291302.
- Die ländliche Steuergemeinde des Byzantinischen Reiches im X. Jahrhundert, in: Vierteljahrschrift für Sozial- und Wirtschaftsgeschichte, Jg. 20 (1927), S. 1–108 [Dissertation] (Nachdruck 1969).
- Studien zur Geschichte des byzantinischen Bilderstreites. Breslau 1929 [Habilitation] (Nachdruck 1964).
- Geschichte des byzantinischen Staates. Handbuch der Altertumswissenschaft XII.1.2, C. H. Beck, München 1940, 3. Auflage 1963, ISBN 3-406-01414-3. – Sonderausgabe ohne wissenschaftlichen Apparat unter dem Titel Byzantinische Geschichte 324 bis 1453, C. H. Beck, München 1965 (und Nachdrucke, ISBN 3-406-39759-X).

== Sources ==
- Hunger, Herbert (1977). "Georg Ostrogorsky, Nachruf". Almanach der Österreichischen Akademie der Wissenschaften. 127: 538–544.
- Pamela Armstrong (2013). Authority in Byzantium. Ashgate Publishing, Ltd. pp. 330–. ISBN 978-1-4094-3608-9.

Academic offices
Preceded by Borivoje Drobnjaković	Dean of the Faculty of Philosophy; 1957–1958	Succeeded by Vojislav M. Đurić
