= Kypros Chrysostomides =

Cypriot politician (1942–2022)

Kypros Chrysostomides (Greek: Κύπρος Χρυσοστομίδης, pronounced [ˈcipros krisostoˈmiðis]; 5 July 1942 – 1 December 2022) was a Cypriot politician and member of the Cyprus Parliament, born in the village of Kathikas in Paphos.

== Early life and education ==
Chrysostomides graduated from the Paphos Gymnasium. He studied Law at the University of Athens on a scholarship granted by the Greek government. He continued his studies at the Luxembourg Law School, again on a scholarship, where he studied Comparative Law.

On a further scholarship granted by the German government, he pursued postgraduate studies at the University of Bonn where he obtained a Doctorate in Law (Ph.D.). The area of his specialisation was Business Law. Thereafter, he worked as a scientific assistant to the Professor of Private International Law at the University of Bonn and he continued his studies in England.

== Career ==
For four years (1969–1973) Kypros Chrysostomides worked with the European Commission of Human Rights of the Council of Europe in Strasbourg, France. He returned to Cyprus in 1973 and began practicing law in Nicosia, shortly before the Coup d'état and the Turkish Invasion in 1974.

In 1973, he was appointed a Corresponding Collaborator at the International Institute for the Unification of Private Law (UNIDROIT). In 1999, Cyprus became a full member of UNIDROIT.

From 1981 until his appointment as government spokesman in 2003, he practised law from his own law firm in Nicosia. From 2003, when Tassos Papadopoulos became President of Cyprus, he was the government spokesman until 2006.

Chrysostomides left this post in 2006 in order to take part in the parliamentary elections of 2006 as a result of which he became a member of the House of Representatives (Cyprus) where he served until March 2008, when he was appointed Minister of Justice and Public Order. He resigned from his post in December 2008, following the escape of a convict from the Cyprus Central Prison. Chrysostomides was not personally to blame for this event, and had no knowledge or control over events that led to the escape. His resignation was an assumption of the idea of ministerial responsibility: the doctrine that a minister takes the blame if something goes wrong in his department, even if it is not his fault and he has no knowledge of it. At the time his resignation was widely acclaimed as an act of dignity and a rare acceptance of political responsibility. It continues to this day to be praised as an unusual act of nobility and a high water mark in Cypriot public life. Chrysostomides declined to receive the government pension to which he was entitled, opting instead for the money to be placed in a Government fund.

In 1998 he established the movement "Epalxis Anasiggrotisis Kentrou" ('Επαλξη Ανασυγκρότησης Κέντρου): Political Grouping for the Restructure of the Centre. In 2006, he cooperated with AKEL Left-New Powers for the 2006 Cypriot legislative election. During those elections he was elected AKEL Left-New Powers member in the House of Representatives of Cyprus.

Chrysostomides always maintained an avid interest in public affairs and became politically active in the progressive and democratic centre. He has also been involved in the scientific and social life in Cyprus. He was the president of the Political Grouping for the Restructure of the Centre, which was established in 1998.

Chrysostomides was a founding member of the Consumers' Association, a member of the Association of Sciences, of the Greek Civilization Association and of the Historic Studies Association. He was the president of the Cyprus Institute of Political Research and European Affairs, which closely cooperates with various scientific institutions of Greece and elsewhere. He was also a member of the International Association of International Law, the Greek Institute of International Law, the International Law Association as well as other International Organizations.

Chrysostomides was a member of the International Chamber of Commerce International Court of Arbitration (ICC) for two consecutive terms, until June 2018. He was a member of the ICC Commission on Arbitration and Alternative Dispute Resolution (ADR), serving his second term.

== Personal life ==
Chrysostomides married lawyer Eleni G. Polyviou in 1974. They had two daughters, Daphne and Georgia.

Chrysostomides died on 1 December 2022, at the age of 80.

== Publications ==
Chrysostomides participated in and was the rapporteur and speaker at numerous international conferences, and a number of his articles were published in the Greek and foreign press. He was keenly interested in matters of international and constitutional law, human rights, and local government for which he has gained international recognition.

Professor Christopher Greenwood's introduction to "The Republic of Cyprus. A Study In International Law", describes how Doctor Chrysostomides examines:

"with great care the constitutional history of the Republic of Cyprus, the legal principles applicable to the Turkish invasion of 1974 and subsequent occupation and the substantial body of case law and State practice regarding Cyprus since that date. He discusses the competing legal arguments concerning the application of the Republic of Cyprus to join the European Union, the controversial decisions of the European Court and Commission of Human Rights and the debate regarding the status of the occupied northern part of Cyprus. .Dr Chrysostomides has performed an invaluable service to the international community by providing an analysis of the legal issues which is both careful and timely".

Chrysostomides' book Cyprus: Legal and Political Reflections, received praise for its depth and extensive analysis of the application of international law and ethics in Cyprus. Writing for the Cyprus Review, Stelios Perrakis described it as "an interesting source of information and arguments that serve as a basis for a global reflection on Cyprus and its future as a sovereign, independent, and undivided Republic."

Chrysostomides' last book on International Law entitled "Διεθνές Δίκαιο: Παραβίαση και Παρακμή: Το κράτος Ανδρείκελο στην κατεχόμενη Κύπρο" ("International Law: Violation and Decline. The Puppet state in the occupied part of Cyprus") (November 2022, Rizes Publications) received very favourable reviews. One such review is available in the Spring 2023 issue of The Cyprus Review. The full review is available here.

Chrysostomides was also the author of two children's stories namely, Ο Αρλεκίνος της Φεγγαρόπολης (2013) and Στο μικρό τους σπίτι στο μικρό τους χωριό (2021). Both have won critical acclaim and have been included in the syllabus of Cyprus public elementary schools. The Ministry of Education and Culture approved the book in an official letter dated 2 February 2022.

== Human rights ==
During the period 1969–1973 Kypros Chrysostomides worked with the European Commission of Human Rights of the Council of Europe in Strasbourg, France. During his term at the European Commission, he participated in the Commission's investigation of the accusations against the Greek Junta for violations of human rights.

As a member of the legal secretariat of the European Commission which visited Athens and examined witnesses regarding the allegations against the Greek Junta, Dr. Chrysostomides participated in the team under one of the leaders of the investigation, Professor James Fawcett.

Doctor Chrysostomides conducted interviews of witnesses including politicians under house arrest and other civilians who suffered torture and degrading treatment at the hands of the Junta police. Various locations were visited by the team and police officers, who were suspected of carrying out acts of torture, were examined. Hearings took place at the Evgenideion Foundation Building.

Chrysostomides was one of the first lawyers to defend cases of refugees and other victims of the Turkish invasion before the European Court of Human Rights in Strasbourg. One of his clients was Archimandrite Georgios Papachrysostomou who in 2023 became the Archbishop of Cyprus. During these proceedings Papachrysostomou was awarded pecuniary damages for having suffered humiliating and degrading treatment at the hands of the Turkish army (Application No. 15300/89, adopted on 8 July, 1993).

== Honours ==
- In 1991 during the presidency of François Mitterrand, he was honoured by the French government with the medal of the "Chevalier de l'Ordre National du Merite" (Ordre National du Merite) and then by the Government of Jacques Chirac in 2004 with the medal of "Officier de l'Ordre National du Merite".
- He was also honoured with the "Grand Cross of the Order of Phoenix" («Μεγαλόσταυρος του Τάγματος του Φοίνικα») by the then President of the Third Republic of Greece, Kostis Stephanopoulos.
- In 2020, he was awarded the Cyprus Business Leader Award by the Cyprus Chamber of Commerce and Industry.
- In November 2022, he was honoured with the "Lifetime Achievement Award" in the Cyprus Review Annual Book Awards (CRABA 2022) at the University of Nicosia, in recognition of his significant body of published work, especially on the international aspects of the Cyprus Question.
- In 2023, he posthumously received an award from the Cyprus Consumers Association (of which he was a founding member) in recognition of his life long contribution to consumers and the consumer cause.
- Several legal and academic conferences and events have taken place in 2023 in memory of Kypros Chrysostomides and as a tribute to the wealth of his contribution to the Cyprus legal, political and academic scene.
  - Notably, in March 2023, the Cyprus Bar Association organised and held at Frederick University a conference entitled "The Cyprus Problem: Quo vadis", paying tribute to Kypros Chrysostomides. A significant number of leading Cypriot and Greek academics and practitioners delivered speeches and presented topics that touch upon current domestic and international law issues pertinent to the Cyprus problem, which was Chrysostomides' prime field of academic interest.
  - In December 2023, the Department of Law of the University of Cyprus held a scientific conference in his memory, during which four significant academic speakers shared views and ideas on current legal developments in the fields of European, Commercial and International law. During this conference, Kypros Chrysostomides' latest book entitled International Law: Illegality and Decadence: The puppet state in occupied Cyprus was presented.
