= Society for the Promotion of Byzantine Studies =

Organization

The Society for the Promotion of Byzantine Studies (SPBS) is a scholarly society established in 1983 "with the object of furthering study and knowledge of the history and culture, language and literature of the Byzantine Empire and its neighbours".

The executive of the SPBS is also the UK committee of the Association Internationale des Études Byzantines (AIEB). Its current President is Dame Averil Cameron.

== Publications ==
The society publishes an annual journal, the Bulletin of British Byzantine Studies, and an annual newsletter. An annual Spring Symposium is held, the proceedings of which are published by Ashgate in their Publications of the Society for the Promotion of Byzantine Studies series.
