= Collegium Artium =

Nonprofit science and culture organization

Collegium Artium is an independent, non-profit organisation registered in Poland with a charitable status (according to Polish law: a public benefit organization) promoting open science and open culture.

Projects conducted by Collegium Artium are related to cultural heritage in the broadest sense, with particular emphasis on the history of art. The organisation carries out research projects, publishes a book series and awards fellowships and prizes. As a signatory of, among others, the Berlin Declaration on Open Access to Knowledge in the Sciences and Humanities, it participates in the open science and culture movement and contributes to the creation of the world’s greatest open-access repository of art-historical texts operated by the Heidelberg University Library.

Collegium Artium is a member of Polish National Federation of Non-Governmental Organisations (OFOP) and the Coalition for Open Education (KOED). Supervision: Ministry of Science and Higher Education of the Republic of Poland. The activity of Collegium Artium is managed by the Board, the Council is its controlling body.

== Council ==
- prof. Małgorzata Dąbrowska (University of Łódź)
- prof. Jerzy Miziołek (University of Warsaw)

== Board ==
- Director - Jacek Maj

== Documents ==
Collegium Artium is a signatory of the following documents:

- Budapest Open Access Initiative Declaration
- Berlin Declaration on Open Access to Knowledge in the Sciences and Humanities
- Public Domain Manifesto
- Washington Declaration on Intellectual Property and the Public Interest
- San Francisco Declaration on Research Assessment
- Zurich Declaration on Digital Art History
- Lyon Declaration on Access to Information and Development
- Mainz Declaration on Digital Art History in Teaching
- London Manifesto for Fair Copyright Reform for Libraries and Archives in Europe
- Hague Declaration on Knowledge Discovery in the Digital Age
- Initiative Open Access 2020
