= Gilbert Dagron =

French historian

Gilbert Dagron (January 26, 1932 – August 4, 2015, Paris, France) was a French historian, Byzantine scholar, professor at the College de France (1975–2001), president of the International Association for Byzantine Studies, member of the Academy of Inscriptions and Fine Arts.

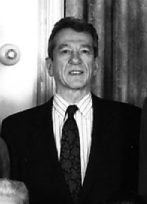
Gilbert Dagron in 1992.

== Education ==
In 1956 he graduated from the École Normale Supérieure with a degree in classical literature. In 1956–1957 he taught at the Lyceum in Lana.

== Career ==
Since 1960, an employee of the Directorate for Culture and Technology of the French Foreign Ministry. In 1962–1964 he worked as a cultural attaché at the French Embassy in Moscow.

Since 1969 – Assistant Professor of the History of the Middle Ages at the Sorbonne University. In 1972 he received a doctorate in philology and the humanities. Since 1975 professor of history and civilization of the Byzantine world at the College de France. Since 1994 – an ordinary member of the French Academy of Inscriptions and Fine Arts. 1997–2000 – Administrator of the College de France, President of the Assembly of Professors. President of the Academy of Inscriptions and Fine Arts (2003).

Member of the Academy of Athens, Accademia dei Lincei (Rome), American Academy of Arts and Sciences, member of French scientific associations of late antiquity, medieval studies.

== Honours and awards ==
- Officier of the Legion of Honour
- Commander of the Ordre des Palmes académiques
- Cross for Military Valour
- Diane Potier-Boès Prize of the Académie Française (1985).
- Honorary degree of the National and Kapodistrian University of Athens (1991).
- Prize of the Revue des deux Mondes (2008).

== Death ==
He died on August 4, 2015. The farewell ceremony took place on August 10 at the Church of Saint Leon, in the XV arrondissement of Paris.

== Works ==
- Naissance d'une capitale. Constantinople et ses institutions de 330 à 451 (Bibliothèque byzantine), Paris, Presses universitaires de France, 1974, 578 p.
- Leçon inaugurale au Collège de France, 30 January 1976, Paris, 1976.
- Ed., Vie et miracle de sainte Thècle, texte grec, traduction et commentaire, Bruxelles, Subsidia Hagiographica, 1978, 456 p.
- Ed., avec P. Lemerle et S. Cirkovic, Archives de l'Athos. Tome II: Actes de saint Pantéléèmôn, Paris, 1982, 238 p.
- La romanité chrétienne en Orient: héritages et mutations, Londres, Variorum Reprints, 1984, 330 p.
- Constantinople imaginaire. Études sur le recueil des Patria, Paris, Bibliothèque byzantine, 1984, 358 p. Prix Diane-Potier-Boès 1985
- Ed., Le traité sur la guérilla de l'empereur Nicéphore Phocas (963-969), Paris, 1986, 358 p.
- Ed., avec D. Feissel, Inscriptions de Cilicie, Paris, Travaux et mémoires du Centre de recherche, d'histoire et de civilisation byzantines, 1987, 297 p.
- « Le christianisme byzantin du VIIe au milieu du XIe siècle », in Histoire du christianisme. Tome 4, Paris, Desclée de Brouwer, 1993, p. 7–371.
- Empereur et prêtre. Étude sur le "césaropapisme" byzantin, Paris, Gallimard, 1996, 435 p.
- Ed., avec J. Beaucamp, La transmission du patrimoine. Byzance et l'aire méditerranéenne, Paris, Travaux et mémoires du Centre de recherche, d'histoire et de civilisation byzantines, 1998.
- « L'organisation et le déroulement des courses d'après le Livre des cérémonies », in Travaux et mémoires du Centre de recherche, d'histoire et de civilisation byzantine, Paris, 2000, p. 1–200.
- Décrire et peindre. Essai sur le portrait iconique, Paris, Gallimard, 2007, 298 p.
- L'hippodrome de Constantinople, Paris, Gallimard, 2011, 448 p.
- Idées byzantines, 2 tomes, Paris, Centre d’histoire et civilisation de Byzance du Collège de France, 2012
