= Byzantine studies =

Studies about the Byzantine Empire

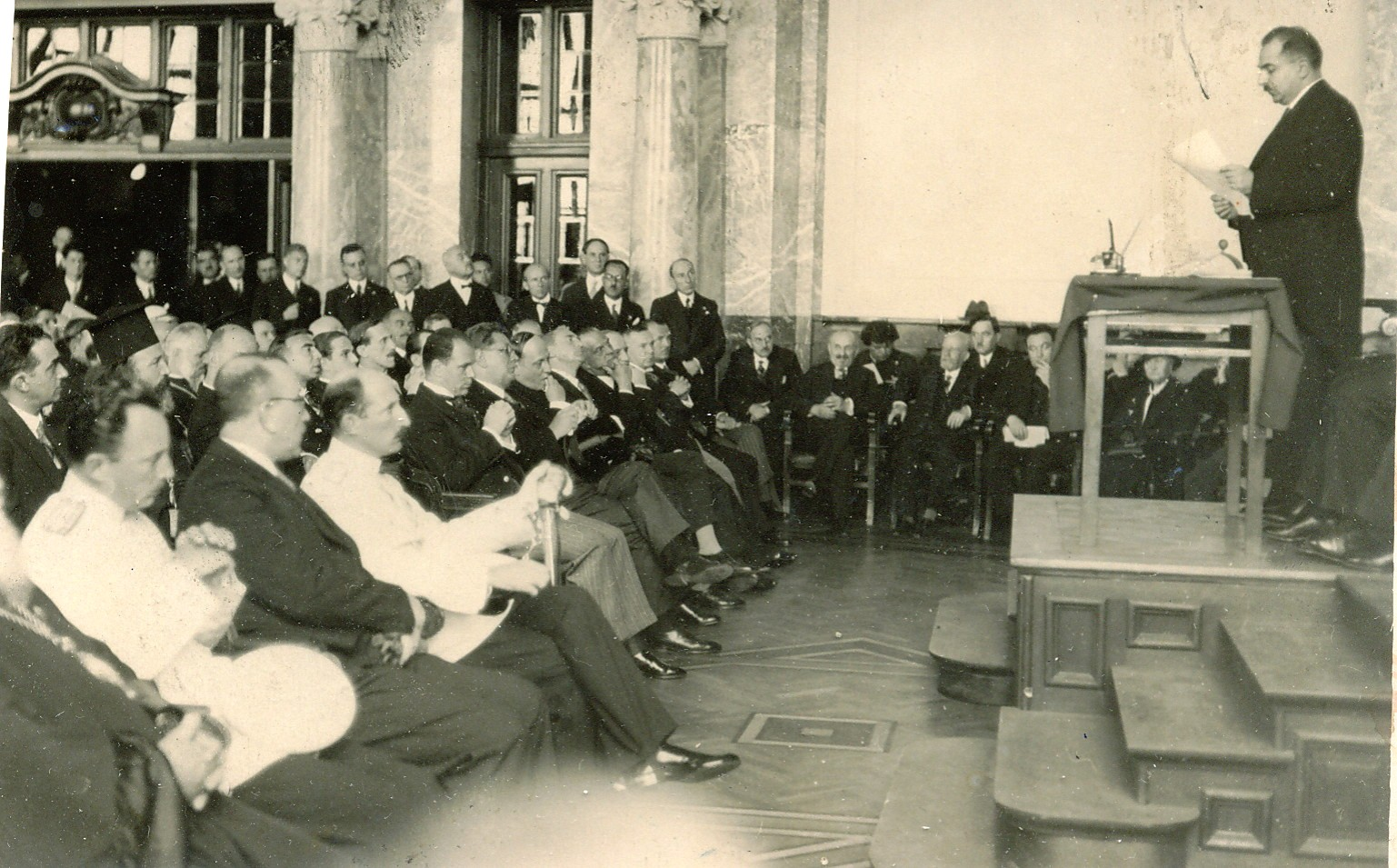
The opening session of the IV International Congress of Byzantine Studies in the Aula of the University of Sofia, 9 November 1934

Byzantine studies is an interdisciplinary branch of the humanities that addresses the history, culture, demography, dress, religion/theology, art, literature/epigraphy, music, science, economy, coinage and politics of the Roman Empire as it evolved into the Byzantine Empire. The German Humanist, Hieronymus Wolf is often credited with applying the name "Byzantine" to describe the Eastern part of the Roman Empire first, which continued after the Western Roman Empire collapsed in 476 AD. About 100 years after the final conquest of Constantinople by the Ottomans, Wolf began to collect, edit, and translate the writings of Byzantine philosophers. Other 16th-century humanists introduced Byzantine studies to Holland and Italy. The subject may also be called Byzantinology or Byzantology, although these terms are usually found in English translations of original non-English sources. A scholar of Byzantine studies is called a Byzantinist.

== Structure ==
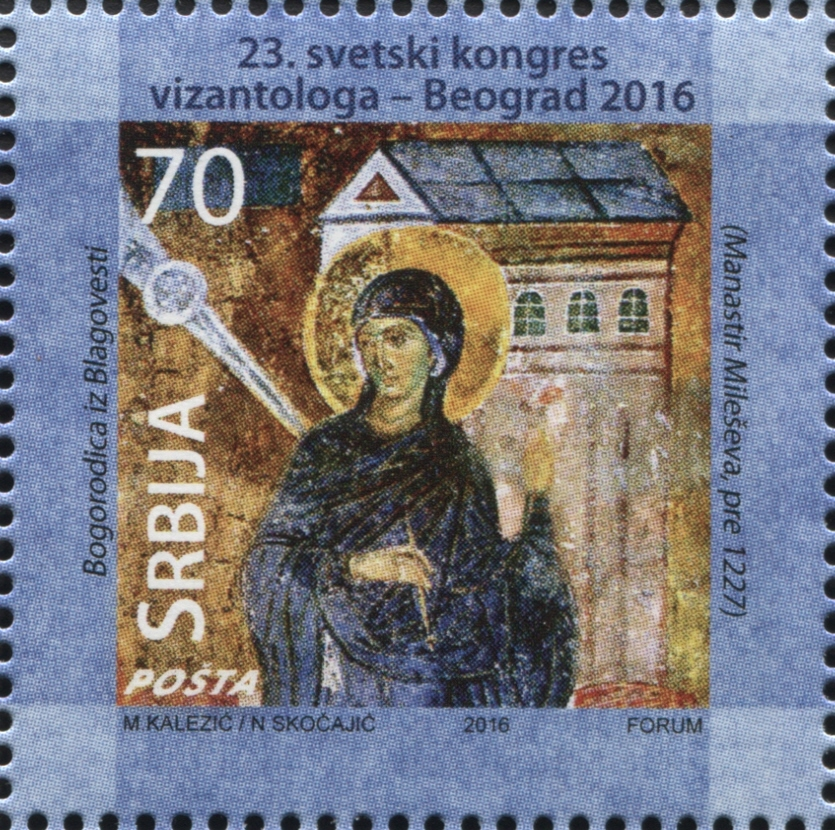
23rd Byzantology Congress in Belgrade, 2016 post stamp of Serbia

=== Definition ===
Byzantine studies is the discipline that addresses the history and culture of Byzantium (Byzantium ↔ Byzantine Empire, the Greek Middle Ages; Byzantium = Constantinople [as capital of the Byzantine Empire]). Thus the unity of the object of investigation ("Byzantium") stands in contrast to the diversity of approaches (= specializations) that may be applied to it. – There were already "Byzantine" studies in the high medieval Byzantine Empire. In the later Middle Ages, the interest in Byzantium (in particular the original Greek sources) was carried on by Italian humanism, and it expanded in the 17th century throughout Europe and Russia. The late 19th and early 20th centuries brought the formation of Byzantine studies as an independent discipline.

=== Byzantium ===
Greek-Hellenistic culture, Roman state traditions, Oriental influence and Christian faith, together with a relative unity of language and culture, constitute medieval Byzantium. The starting point of Byzantine history is usually taken to be the reign of Constantine the Great (306–337) and the foundation of Constantinople (330). The "East Roman" (or Late Antique) era of Byzantium begins at the latest with the division of the Roman Empire into a Western Roman Empire and an Eastern Roman Empire (395). This "Early Byzantine" period lasts until approximately 641 AD. Emperor Justinian I (527–65) reconquered Italy, north Africa, and southern Spain, but after the expansion of Islam (634/98) a reorganized Byzantium, now based on administration by Themes, was limited to the Greek-speaking regions of the Balkan peninsula, Asia Minor, and southern Italy; Latin was abandoned as the language of officialdom. This may be perceived as the "end of antiquity", and the beginning of the "Middle Byzantine" era.

This was also the era of Iconoclasm (717–843) and of the origin of the Holy Roman Empire (800). Under the Macedonian Dynasty (10th–11th centuries) Byzantium regained power against the Islamic and Bulgarian states, but the death of Emperor Basil II marked a turning point, with Byzantine power in Asia Minor and southern Italy suffering from the Battle of Manzikert (1071) and the rise of the Normans, respectively. A certain stability was achieved under the Comnenian Dynasty, at least until the Battle of Myriokephalon (1176). Internal conflicts facilitated the sack of Constantinople by the Crusaders (the Fourth Crusade of 1204) and the establishment of Latin states in the south Balkans.

The late period of the Byzantine Empire as a small state begins with the Palaiologos dynasty, which was particularly threatened by the advances of the Ottoman Empire and the economic influence of Venice and Genoa. An empire weakened in part through civil war suffered a severe blow when Thessalonica was captured in 1430, and finally fell to the Ottomans (Fall of Constantinople in 1453, and of Mistras in 1461). The Empire of Trebizond (1204–1461), founded in the wake of the Fourth Crusade, also forms a part of Byzantine history.

=== Languages ===
It is possible to distinguish between three levels of speech: Atticism (the literary language), Koine (the common language of the Hellenistic period), and Demotic (the popular language, and the forerunner of modern Greek). Thus a certain diglossia between spoken Greek and written, classical Greek may be discerned.

Major genres of Byzantine literature include historiography (both in the classical mode and in the form of chronicles), hagiography (in the form of the biographical account or bios and the panegyric or enkomion); hagiographic collections (the menaia and synaxaria), epistolography, rhetoric, and poetry. From the Byzantine administration, broadly construed, we have works such as description of peoples and cities, accounts of court ceremonies, and lists of precedence. Technical literature is represented, for example, by texts on military strategy. Collections of civil and canon law are preserved, as well as documents and acta (see "Diplomatics" below). Some texts in the demotic are also preserved.

=== Identity ===
There are currently three main schools of thought on medieval eastern Roman identity in modern Byzantine scholarship: 1) a potentially preponderant view that considers "Romanity" the mode of self-identification of the subjects of a multi-ethnic empire, in which the elite did not self-identify as Greek and the average subject considered him/herself as "Roman", 2) a school of thought that developed largely under the influence of modern Greek nationalism, treating Romanness as the medieval manifestation of a perennial Greek national identity, 3) a line of thought recently proposed by Anthony Kaldellis arguing that Eastern Roman identity was a pre-modern national identity.

=== Auxiliary sciences ===
==== Byzantine archaeology ====
Byzantine archaeology has increasingly developed into a distinct academic discipline concerned with its architecture and material culture. Historically, the field has been shaped by a strong emphasis on ecclesiastical studies and art history, although more recent scholarship has begun to place greater weight on secular themes and everyday objects.

Early classical excavations in territories of the former Byzantine world often showed little regard for these later periods and instead focused primarily on more prominent Hellenistic remains. Consequently, a significant number of Byzantine and occasionally even Roman remains were lost due to overzealous excavation practices. By contrast, excavations in Near Eastern archaeology have at times demonstrated a more careful and systematic approach to Byzantine strata, as exemplified by the secondary but nonetheless well-documented 10th–12th-century monastic complex at the prominent site of Hattusa.

==== Modes of transmission ====
Modes of transmission entail the study of texts that are preserved primarily on papyrus, parchment or paper, in addition to inscriptions, coins, and medals. The papyrus rolls of antiquity (papyrology) are quickly replaced by the parchment codices of the Middle Ages (codicology), while paper arrives in the 9th century via the Arabs and Chinese.

==== Diplomatics ====
Diplomatics entails the study of Byzantine documents. Documents may be classified according to their producers as secular (imperial and private documents) or sacred (patriarchal and episcopal documents), or according to their means of preservation (the originals, imitations, or simple copies). Imperial documents may be divided into those that promulgate law (types: edikton, typos, pragmatikos typos, thespisma, neara, nomos, sakra; mandatum principis), present decisions regarding specific cases (Epistula type: epistule, sakra; Subscriptio type: lysis [administration, taxes], semeiosis), documents of foreign policy (treaties, letters to foreign rulers) (types: sakrai, grammata, basilikon, chrysobullos horismos, chrysobullon sigillon, prokuratorikon chrysobullon) and administrative documents (types: prostagmata, horismoi, sigillia, codicilli). Sacred documents are the documents and official letters of the patriarchs, including the gramma, homologia (creeds), diatheke (testaments), 'aphorismos (excommunication), paraitesis (abdication) as well as the ceremonial praxis (synodike) and the hypotyposis (the resolution of a synod) and the tomos (dogmatic edicts). The most splendid form of privileged communication, in the form of a letter, was chrysobullos logos so called because the Emperor's word (logos) appeared three times in red ink. They were used in the appointments of Imperial ambassadors and they were stamped with the Imperial golden seal (Chrysos = gold and bulla = seal).

===== Sigillography and palaeography =====
Specific subsets of diplomatics entail sigillography, the study of seals, and palaeography, the study of scripts.

=== Epigraphy ===
Byzantine epigraphy entails the study of various stone, metal, ivory, mosaic, enamel, and paint inscriptions.

=== Numismatics ===
Byzantine numismatics entails the study of imperial coins and mints. Building on the gold standard of Late Antiquity, the Byzantine monetary system was, until the middle of the 14th century, based on a gold standard, and included silver, bronze, and copper coins. With the economic and political decline of the late period, the gold standard was abandoned in the final century of Byzantine history, and replaced by a silver-based system.

=== Metrology ===
Byzantine metrology entails the study of Byzantine weights and measures. A great number of measures of length were used, including modified forms of the Greek and Roman units of the finger, kondylos, anticheir, palaiste, dichas, spithame, pechys, pace, fathom, schoenus (field measurement), plethron, mile, allage, and an average day's journey. Measure of volume included: litra, tagarion, pinakion, modios, and those of surface area modios, megalos modios and zeugarion. Measures for water and wine were called megarikon, metron and tetartion. Measures of weight were krithokokkon, sitokokkon, gramma, obolos, drachme, ungia, litra, kentenarion, gomarion and pesa.

=== Chronology ===
Byzantine chronology entails the study of the computation of time. According to the various Byzantine calendar systems, Year 1 AD. = Year 754 ab urbe condita = the first year of the 195th Olympiad = Year 49 of the Antiochean era = Year 5493 of the Alexandrine era = Year 312 of the Seleucid era = Year 5509 from the formation of the world. The Byzantine year began with 1 September, believed to be the Day of Creation, e.g., 1 January through 31 August belonged to the year 5508, 1 September through 31 December to the year 5509. Dating according to indiction remained standard.

== Organizations ==
- Institute for Byzantine Studies (Serbian: Vizantološki institut), academic institute of the Serbian Academy of Science and Arts
- Institut für Byzanzforschung (IBF) (in German), Austrian Academy of Sciences
- Institute for Byzantine and Modern Greek Studies (IBMGS), non-profit cultural organization, Belmont, Massachusetts
- International Association of Byzantine Studies (AIEB)
- Byzantine Studies Association of North America, Inc. (BSANA)
- Australian Association for Byzantine Studies (AABS), non-profit organization, Australia and New Zealand
- Society for the Promotion of Byzantine Studies (SPBS), U.K.
- Byzantine Institute of America, Dumbarton Oaks, Washington D.C.
- Leibniz-WissenschaftsCampus Mainz: Byzanz zwischen Orient und Okzident, Germany.
- International Association of South-East European Studies
- Byzantinische und neugriechische Philologie, Leipzig, Germany

== Journals ==
- Byzantine and Modern Greek Studies, Birmingham, ISSN 0307-0131.
- Byzantina Symmeikta, Athens, ISSN 1105-1639.
- Byzantinische Zeitschrift, Munich, ISSN 0007-7704.
- Byzantinoslavica, Prague, ISSN 0007-7712
- Byzantion: revue internationale des études byzantines, Brussels.
- Dumbarton Oaks Papers, Washington, ISSN 0070-7546.
- Gouden hoorn, Amsterdam, ISSN 0929-7820
- Greek, Roman, and Byzantine Studies,
- Jahrbuch der Österreichischen Byzantinistik, Vienna, ISSN 0378-8660.
- Revue des études byzantines, Paris, ISSN 0373-5729.
- Rivista di studi bizantini e neoellenici, Rome, ISSN 0557-1367.
- The Byzantine Review, Münster, ISSN 2699-4267.(The Byzantine Review)
- Vizantiyskiy Vremennik, Moscow, ISSN 0132-3776
- Zbornik radova Vizantološkog instituta, Belgrade, ISSN 0584-9888.

== Notable people ==
- Athanasios Angelou (b. 1951), Greek, literature
- Sergey Averintsev (1937–2004), Russian, culture
- Peter Charanis (1908–1985), Greek and American, history and demography
- Igor Chichurov (1946-2008), Russian, history and literature
- Franz Dölger (1891–1968), German, diplomatics
- Božidar Ferjančić (1929–1998), Serbian, history
- Henri Grégoire (1881–1964), Belgian, philology
- Philip Grierson (1910-2006), British, history and numismatics
- Venance Grumel (1890–1967), French, history and chronology
- Judith Herrin (b. 1942), British, archaeology
- Karl Hopf (1832–1873), German, history
- Herbert Hunger (1914–2000), Austrian, literature
- Sergey Ivanov (b. 1956), Russian, history and literature
- Anthony Kaldellis (b. 1971), American, history and culture
- Alexander Kazhdan (1922–1997), Russian and American, history
- Héctor Herrera Cajas (1930–1997), Chilean, diplomatics
- Angeliki Laiou (1941–2008), Greek-American, society
- Viktor Lazarev (1897–1976), Russian, art
- Ruth Macrides (1969-2019), American and British, history, literature and law
- Maria Mavroudi (b. 1967), Greek-American, philology
- John Meyendorff (1926–1992), French and American, theology
- Gyula Moravcsik (1892–1972), Hungarian, philology
- Wilhelm Nyssen (1925–1994), German, theology
- George Ostrogorsky (1902–1976), Yugoslav-Russian
- Vassili (Wilhelm) Eduardovich Regel (1857–1932), Russia
- Émile Renauld (1870–?), French, history
- Silvia Ronchey (b. 1958), Italian, philology
- Semavi Eyice (1922-2018), Turkish art historian
- Steven Runciman (1903–2003), English, Byzantium and the Crusades
- Gustave Schlumberger (1844–1929), French, numismatics
- Nicolae Șerban Tanașoca (1941–2017), Romanian, history and philology
- Warren Treadgold (b. 1949), American, Byzantine Military Organisation
- Fyodor Uspensky (1845–1928), Russian, Byzantine-Bulgarian relations
- Alexander Vasiliev (1867–1953), Russian, history and culture
- Vasily Vasilievsky (1838–1899), Russian
- Andrey Vinogradov (b. 1976), Russian, history, hagiography, epigraphy, architecture
- Speros Vryonis (1928–2019), Greek and American, history
- Dionysios Zakythinos (1905–1993), Greek, history

== See also ==
- Balkan studies
- Classics
- Hellenic studies
- Slavic studies

== Literature ==
- Evans, Helen C. & Wixom, William D. (1997). The glory of Byzantium: art and culture of the Middle Byzantine era, A.D. 843-1261. New York: The Metropolitan Museum of Art. ISBN 9780810965072.
- Baynes, Norman Hepburn (1955). Byzantine studies and other essays. London: U. of London.
- Kazhdan, Aleksandr Petrovich (1982). People and power in Byzantium: an introduction to modern Byzantine studies. Dumbarton Oaks.
- Gregory, Timothy E. (1990). "Intensive archaeological survey and its place in Byzantine studies". Byzantine Studies. 13 (2): 155–175.
- Charanis, Peter (1972). Studies on the demography of the Byzantine empire: collected studies. Variorum Publishing.
- Hendy, Michael F. (1969). "Coinage and money in the Byzantine Empire, 1081-1261". 12. Dumbarton Oaks Center for Byzantine Studies.
- Ivanova, Mirela; Anderson, Benjamin (2024). "The Politics of Byzantine Studies: Between Nations and Empires". The English Historical Review.
- Jeffreys, Elizabeth; Haldon, John F.; Cormack, Robin (2008). The Oxford handbook of Byzantine studies. Oxford University Press.
- Barker, Ernest, ed. (1957). Social and Political Thought in Byzantium: From Justinian I to the Last Palaeologus. Oxford: Clarendon Press.
- Vasiliev, Alexander A. (1927). "Byzantine Studies in Russia, Past and Present". The American Historical Review. 32 (3): 539–545. doi:10.2307/1837746. JSTOR 1837746.
- Beck, Hans-Georg (1977). Byzantinistik heute (in German). Berlin: De Gruyter. ISBN 3-11-007220-3.
- Hunger, Herbert (1973). Byzantinische Grundlagenforschung (in German). London.
- Irmscher, Johannes (1971). Einführung in die Byzantinistik (in German). Berlin.
- Mazal, Otto (1989). Handbuch der Byzantinistik (in German). Graz.
- Moravcsik, Gyula (1976). Einführung in die Byzantologie (in German). Darmstadt.
- Stouraitis, Ioannis (2014). "Roman Identity in Byzantium: A Critical Approach" (PDF). Byzantinische Zeitschrift. 107 (1): 175–220. doi:10.1515/bz-2014-0009. S2CID 174769546.
