= List of Guggenheim Fellowships awarded in 1964 =

Three hundred and twelve scholars and artists were awarded Guggenheim Fellowships in 1964. More than $1,882,000 was disbursed.

== 1964 U.S. and Canadian Fellows ==
Category	Field of Study	Fellow	Institutional association	Research topic	Notes	Ref
Creative Arts	Choreography	Alwin T. Nikolais	Henry Street Playhouse	Choreography	Also won in 1967	
Creative Arts	Drama and Performing Arts	Jan Alfred Hartman		Writing		
Creative Arts	Drama and Performing Arts	Herbert H. Lieberman		Writing		
Creative Arts	Drama and Performing Arts	Jack Carter Richardson	Columbia University	Writing		
Creative Arts	Fiction	Edward M. Hoagland		Writing	Also won in 1975	
Creative Arts	Fiction	Robie Macauley	Kenyon Review	Writing		
Creative Arts	Fiction	Alan Richard Marcus		Writing		
Creative Arts	Fiction	Larry McMurtry	Rice University	Writing		
Creative Arts	Fiction	Reynolds Price	Duke University	Writing		
Creative Arts	Fiction	Kit Reed		Writing		
Creative Arts	Fiction	Samuel Yellen	Indiana University	Writing		
Creative Arts	Fine Arts	Robert Maurice Broderson	Duke University	Painting		
Creative Arts	Fine Arts	Peter Grippe	Brandeis University	Sculpture		
Creative Arts	Fine Arts	Robert Mallary	Pratt Institute	Sculpture		
Creative Arts	Fine Arts	Michael Burton Mazur	Rhode Island School of Design			
Creative Arts	Fine Arts	James McGarrell	Indiana University	Painting		
Creative Arts	Fine Arts	Anthony Padovano	University of Connecticut	Sculpture		
Creative Arts	Fine Arts	Gabor Peterdi	Yale School of Art	Printmaking		
Creative Arts	Fine Arts	Robert H. Rohm	Pratt Institute	Sculpture		
Creative Arts	Fine Arts	James Rosati	Yale University	Sculpture		
Creative Arts	Fine Arts	Frank Roth	School of Visual Arts	Painting		
Creative Arts	Fine Arts	Jerome Anthony Savage	University of Illinois	Painting		
Creative Arts	Fine Arts	Romas Viesulas	Temple University		Also won in 1958, 1969	
Creative Arts	Music Composition	Dominick Argento	University of Minnesota	Composing	Also won in 1957	
Creative Arts	Music Composition	Ernst Bacon	Wesleyan University	Composing	Also won in 1939, 1942	
Creative Arts	Music Composition	William Bolcom	Stanford University	Composing	Also won in 1968	
Creative Arts	Music Composition	Michael C. Colgrass		Composing	Also won in 1967	
Creative Arts	Music Composition	Gene Gutchë		Composing	Also won in 1963	
Creative Arts	Music Composition	Robert Helps		Composing		
Creative Arts	Music Composition	Ulysses Kay	Broadcast Music, Inc. (consultant)	Composing		
Creative Arts	Music Composition	Donald H. Keats	Antioch College	Composing	Also won in 1972	
Creative Arts	Music Composition	Ezra Laderman		Composing	Also won in 1956, 1958	
Creative Arts	Music Composition	Marvin David Levy		Composing	Also won in 1960	
Creative Arts	Music Composition	Robert Lombardo	University of Hartford	Composing		
Creative Arts	Music Composition	Roger Reynolds		Composing		
Creative Arts	Music Composition	Halsey Stevens	University of Southern California	Composing	Also won in 1971	
Creative Arts	Music Composition	Lester Trimble	University of Maryland	Composing		
Creative Arts	Music Composition	Donald Waxman		Composing		
Creative Arts	Music Composition	Charles Whittenberg	Columbia-Princeton Electronic Music Center	Composing	Also won in 1963	
Creative Arts	Photography	Robert Adelman		Context of contemporary affluence		
Creative Arts	Photography	William Ralph Current		Prehistoric dwelling sites in the American Southwest		
Creative Arts	Photography	Dave Heath		Human condition in the United States	Also won in 1963	
Creative Arts	Photography	Garry Winogrand		American life	Also won in 1969, 1978	
Creative Arts	Poetry	Robert Bly		Writing	Also won in 1972	
Creative Arts	Poetry	Philip Booth	Wellesley College	Writing	Also won in 1958	
Creative Arts	Poetry	Robert Creeley	University of New Mexico	Writing	Also won in 1971	
Creative Arts	Poetry	Jack Gilbert	Juniata College	Writing		
Creative Arts	Poetry	Jerome Mazzaro	State University of New York at Cortland	Writing		
Creative Arts	Poetry	Robert Sward	Cornell University	Writing		
Creative Arts	Poetry	James Wright	Macalester College	Writing	Also won in 1978	
Humanities	American Literature	Joseph L. Blotner	University of Virginia	William Faulkner	Also won in 1967	
Humanities	American Literature	William Merriam Gibson	New York University	Critical study of Mark Twain, emphasizing the "despair group" of his writings	Also won in 1976	
Humanities	American Literature	William Henry Gilman	University of Rochester		Also won in 1960	
Humanities	American Literature	Richard Warren Schickel		American comic novel from 1945 to present		
Humanities	American Literature	Eleanor M. Tilton	Barnard College	Edits of over 1,000 letters of Ralph Waldo Emerson		
Humanities	American Literature	Hyatt Howe Waggoner	Brown University	Critical history of American poetry	Also won in 1971	
Humanities	American Literature	Christof A. Wegelin	University of Oregon	American genre of international fiction, that is, of fiction dealing with confrontation between Americans and Europeans		
Humanities	Architecture, Planning and Design	Clay Lancaster		Studies in the development of Kentucky architecture	Also won in 1953	
Humanities	Architecture, Planning and Design	Janko Ivan Rasic		Design of a contemporary museum of classical sculpture in Aphrodisias, Turkey		
Humanities	Architecture, Planning and Design	Lloyd Rodwin	Massachusetts Institute of Technology	National policies for urban and regional planning in developing countries		
Humanities	Architecture, Planning and Design	Bernard Rudofsky	Museum of Modern Art	Nonformal, nonclassified architecture with particular reference to communal art	Also won in 1963, 1971	
Humanities	Architecture, Planning and Design	Paolo Soleri			Also won in 1967	
Humanities	Bibliography	Thomas R. Buckman	Libraries of Kansas	Organization of the book trade and the book distribution abroad		
Humanities	Biography	Howard Mumford Jones	Harvard University	American thought	Also won in 1932, 1935	
Humanities	British History	Alfred M. Gollin			Also won in 1961, 1971	
Humanities	British History	Mary Peter Mack	Columbia University	British political thought in the 20th century		
Humanities	British History	Leonard M. Thompson	University of California, Los Angeles		Also won in 1981	
Humanities	British History	David E. Underdown	University of Virginia	Politics of the English Puritan Revolution	Also won in 1991	
Humanities	Classics	William Musgrave Calder	Columbia University	Dramatic techniques of Sophocles		
Humanities	Classics	George E. Dimock	Smith College	The Odyssey		
Humanities	Classics	Demetrius J. Georgacas	University of North Dakota	Compilation of a modern Greek-English dictionary	Also won in 1957	
Humanities	Classics	George A. Kennedy	Haverford College			
Humanities	Classics	Ramsay MacMullen	Brandeis University	Patterns of unrest in the Roman Empire		
Humanities	Classics	Emily Townsend Vermeule	Boston University	Aesthetics of late Mycenaean and Minoan art		
Humanities	East Asian Studies	Kenneth K. Chen	Princeton University			
Humanities	East Asian Studies	Howard S. Hibbett	Harvard University	Psychological novel in Japan since 1900		
Humanities	Economic History	Thomas C. Smith	Stanford University	History of Japanese corporate societies		
Humanities	English Literature	Martin Carey Battestin	University of Virginia	Editing of three major novels by Henry Fielding -- Joseph Andrews; The History of Tom Jones, a Foundling; and Amelia		
Humanities	English Literature	David M. Bevington	University of Virginia	Divine right of kings and related topics in the early Renaissance theater	Also won in 1981	
Humanities	English Literature	Kalman Aaron Burnim	Tufts University	Biographical dictionary of stage performers in London, 1669-1800		
Humanities	English Literature	Jack Parker Dalton		Edition of the 66 notebooks used by James Joyce in writing Finnegans Wake	Also won in 1966	
Humanities	English Literature	Robert Allen Durr	Syracuse University	Work on his book Poetic Vision and the Psychedelic Experience (pub. 1970)		
Humanities	English Literature	Brendan Peter O Hehir	University of California, Berkeley	The prince as a poetic principle in English Augustan poetry		
Humanities	English Literature	F. David Hoeniger	University of Toronto	Shakespeare and the natural history of his time		
Humanities	English Literature	Irving Howe	Hunter College	Idea of modernism in European and American literature during the last hundred years	Also won in 1971	
Humanities	English Literature	George Morrow Kahrl	Elmira College	David Garrick		
Humanities	English Literature	Ralph James Kaufmann	University of Rochester	English tragedy and intellectual history		
Humanities	English Literature	Maynard Mack	Yale University	Alexander Pope	Also won in 1942, 1982	
Humanities	English Literature	Thomas A. McFarland	Western Reserve University		Also won in 1973	
Humanities	English Literature	Samuel I. Mintz	City College of New York	Thomas Hobbes		
Humanities	English Literature	Arthur Mizener	Cornell University			
Humanities	English Literature	Daniel Seltzer	Harvard University	Development of Shakespeare's ethical view and artistic method		
Humanities	English Literature	Jack Clifford Stillinger	University of Illinois	University of Illinois	Keats, Wordsworth, and English romanticism	
Humanities	English Literature	Harold Earl Toliver	Ohio State University		Also won in 1975	
Humanities	English Literature	Andrew Winchester Turnbull		Life of Thomas Wolfe		
Humanities	English Literature	John E. Unterecker	Columbia University	Yeats and the Abbey Theater		
Humanities	Film, Video, and Radio Studies	Pauline Kael	University of California, Berkeley	Relationship of film to other arts and other popular media		
Humanities	Fine Arts Research	John Walker McCoubrey	University of Pennsylvania			
Humanities	Fine Arts Research	Jules Prown	Yale University	Life and works of 18th-century American artist John Singleton Copley		
Humanities	Fine Arts Research	Donald Robertson	Tulane University			
Humanities	Fine Arts Research	Irving Sandler	New York University; The New York Post	American abstract expressionism		
Humanities	Folklore and Popular Culture	Richard Mercer Dorson	Indiana University	Uses of oral tradition to the historian	Also won in 1949, 1971	
Humanities	French Literature	Pierre Aubery	University at Buffalo	Mécislas Golberg		
Humanities	French Literature	Alfred Glauser	University of Wisconsin			
Humanities	French Literature	Léon-François Hoffmann	Princeton University			
Humanities	French Literature	Basil James Guy	University of California, Berkeley	Prince Charles de Ligne and his works		
Humanities	French Literature	Renée Riese Hubert	San Fernando Valley State College	Functions of visual elements in the French prose-poem		
Humanities	French Literature	Gita May	Columbia University	Intellectual and emotional temper of the direct heirs of the French Enlightenment who played a significant role during the French Revolution		
Humanities	General Nonfiction	Emile Capouya	New School for Social Research	Book publishing in the United States		
Humanities	General Nonfiction	Franklin A. Russell		Natural history of the St. Lawrence maritime region		
Humanities	German and East European History	Andreas Tietze	University of California, Los Angeles			
Humanities	German and East European History	Peter F. Sugar	University of Washington			
Humanities	German and Scandinavian Literature	Karl S. Guthke	University of California, Berkeley	Mythology of nihilism in German literature		
Humanities	German and Scandinavian Literature	Walter G. Johnson	University of Washington	Booktrade in contemporary Sweden	Also won in 1957	
Humanities	German and Scandinavian Literature	Michael Mann	University of California, Berkeley	Romanticism in German literature and music, 1780-1840		
Humanities	German and Scandinavian Literature	Franz H. Mautner	Swarthmore College	Book about G. C. Lichtenberg	Also won in 1968	
Humanities	German and Scandinavian Literature	William G. Moulton	Princeton University			
Humanities	German and Scandinavian Literature	Theodore Joseph Ziolkowski	Columbia University	Time in the modern German novel		
Humanities	History of Science and Technology	Asger Hartvig Aaboe	Yale University	Ancient mathematical astronomy		
Humanities	History of Science and Technology	Thomas Neville Bonner	University of Cincinnati	History of the United States home front during World War II	Also won in 1958	
Humanities	History of Science and Technology	Gerald Joseph Gruman	Lake Erie College	Work on a book concerning people of the 19th and early 20th centuries to tried to cope with the problems and ageing and death		
Humanities	History of Science and Technology	Brooke Hindle	New York University	Transit of technology to the United States in the period 1783 to 1812		
Humanities	Iberian and Latin American History	Townsend Miller		Enrique IV		
Humanities	Iberian and Latin American History	Richard McGee Morse	Yale University	General theory of Latin American urban history		
Humanities	Intellectual and Cultural History	Gian N. Orsini	University of Wisconsin			
Humanities	Italian Literature	Aldo S. Bernardo	Harpur College	Relationship between the 14th-century poet Petrarch and Laura		
Humanities	Latin American Literature	José Juan Arrom	Yale University	Contemporary Spanish-American literature in relation to its cultural environment	Also won in 1947	
Humanities	Latin American Literature	Mario Rodríguez	University of Southern California			
Humanities	Linguistics	Henrik Birnbaum	University of California, Los Angeles			
Humanities	Linguistics	Isidore Dyen	Yale University	Language limit problem	Also won in 1949	
Humanities	Linguistics	Mary Rosamond Haas	University of California, Berkeley	American Indian languages		
Humanities	Linguistics	Gene M. Schramm	University of California, Berkeley	Generative morphophonemic analysis of literary Hebrew with primary emphasis on the verbal system		
Humanities	Linguistics	Francis James Whitfield	University of California, Berkeley	Slavic linguistics		
Humanities	Literary Criticism	Robert B. Heilman	University of Washington	Tragedy and melodrama	Also won in 1975	
Humanities	Literary Criticism	Eric Donald Hirsch	Yale University	General theory of textual interpretation		
Humanities	Literary Criticism	John O. McCormick	Rutgers University		Also won in 1979	
Humanities	Literary Criticism	Richard M. Ohmann	Wesleyan University	Syntactic foundations of literary style		
Humanities	Literary Criticism	M. L. Rosenthal	New York University	British poetry and poetic criticism since World War II	Also won in 1960	
Humanities	Literary Criticism	Maurice Valency	Columbia University	Dramatic works of Chekhov, Pirandello, and Shaw	Also won in 1960	
Humanities	Medieval History	Thomas N. Bisson	Brown University			
Humanities	Medieval History	Peter Riesenberg	Washington University in St. Louis			
Humanities	Medieval Literature	Morton Wilfred Bloomfield	Harvard University	Problems of medieval narrative	Also won in 1949	
Humanities	Medieval Literature	Curt F. Bühler	Morgan Library & Museum	Edition of Stephen Scrope's Epistle of Othea	Also won in 1976	
Humanities	Medieval Literature	Richard M. Hazelton	Washington University in St. Louis			
Humanities	Medieval Literature	Jerome Taylor	University of Chicago	Literary theory during the 12th, 13th, and 14th centuries		
Humanities	Music Research	Jan P. LaRue	New York University	Background of the classical symphony		
Humanities	Music Research	Gilbert Reaney	University of California, Los Angeles			
Humanities	Music Research	Hans Tischler	Roosevelt University	Evolution of the musical and poetic styles of the early 13th century motet		
Humanities	Near Eastern Studies	George T. Dennis	Loyola Marymount University	Detailed examination of the writings of the Emperor Manuel II Palaeologus		
Humanities	Near Eastern Studies	Norman Golb	University of Chicago	Economic, social, and religious history of the Jews of Fatima, Egypt	Also won in 1966	
Humanities	Philosophy	Alan Ross Anderson	Yale University	Concept of entailment or logical consequence		
Humanities	Philosophy	Stephen Francis Barker	Ohio State University			
Humanities	Philosophy	Paul Edwards	New York University	Contemporary existentialists		
Humanities	Philosophy	John Rawls	Harvard University	Concept of justice	Also won in 1977	
Humanities	Philosophy	Julius Rudolph Weinberg	University of Wisconsin			
Humanities	Religion	Josef Lewis Altholz	University of Minnesota	English Christian churches of the 19th century		
Humanities	Religion	Horton Davies	Princeton University		Also won in 1959	
Humanities	Religion	William R. Farmer	Southern Methodist University	Origins of the Christian religion in Palestine and Syria		
Humanities	Religion	Paul L. Holmer	Yale University	Critical reassessment of theological language		
Humanities	Religion	Helmut Heinrich Koester	Harvard Divinity School	Growth and development of the so-called Gospel tradition in second century		
Humanities	Religion	Millard Richard Shaull	Princeton Theological Seminary			
Humanities	Renaissance History	Lauro Martines	Reed College	Political role of the lawyer in Renaissance Florence		
Humanities	Renaissance History	Gerald Strauss	Indiana University	Intellectual and social history of Germany and the 16th century	Also won in 1972	
Humanities	Russian History	George Fischer	Cornell University			
Humanities	Russian History	David Joravsky	Brown University			
Humanities	Russian History	Hans Rogger	University of California, Los Angeles			
Humanities	Russian History	Donald W. Treadgold	University of Washington			
Humanities	Russian History	Serge Aleksandr Zenkovsky	Stetson University	Impact of Eastern European religious movements in the 17th and 18th centuries and how they tied in with the rise of capitalism in Russia in the 19th century		
Humanities	Slavic Literature	Victor Erlich	Yale University	Narrative art of Nikolai Gogol	Also won in 1957, 1976	
Humanities	Spanish and Portuguese Literature	José Francisco Cirre	Wayne State University			
Humanities	Spanish and Portuguese Literature	Miguel Enguídanos	University of Texas	Life and works of Rubén Darío		
Humanities	Spanish and Portuguese Literature	Otis H. Green	University of Pennsylvania	Castilian mind in literature from Cantar de mio Cid to Calderón		
Humanities	Spanish and Portuguese Literature	Edwin S. Morby	University of California, Berkeley	Lope de Vega's prose	Also won in 1950	
Humanities	Spanish and Portuguese Literature	Paul Richard Olson	Johns Hopkins University			
Humanities	Theatre Arts	Anthony Caputi	Cornell University			
Humanities	Theatre Arts	Richard Gilman		Postwar theater in Europe and the United States		
Humanities	Theatre Arts	Andrew Joseph Sabol	Brown University	Music of the English Court masque in the early 17th century		
Humanities	United States History	David H. Donald	Johns Hopkins University		Also won in 1985	
Humanities	United States History	Gilbert C. Fite	University of Oklahoma	Work on his book The Agricultural Frontier, 1865-1890		
Humanities	United States History	Frank Freidel	Harvard University	Biography of Franklin D. Roosevelt		
Humanities	United States History	Jack Phillip Greene	Western Reserve University			
Humanities	United States History	William Greenleaf	University of New Hampshire	Impact of the American Civil War on business organization and leadership		
Humanities	United States History	William Turrentine Jackson	University of California, Davis	British mining investments at the turn of the century	Also won in 1957	
Humanities	United States History	Edward Lurie	Wayne State University			
Humanities	United States History	Walter T. K. Nugent	Indiana University	Urban and agrarian tensions in America after the Civil War		
Humanities	United States History	Clarence L. Ver Steeg	Northwestern University	Changing concepts of liberty in early America		
Humanities	United States History	Francis Russell		Life of Warren G. Harding in relation to his time	Also won in 1965	
Natural Sciences	Applied Mathematics	Ralph Bolgiano	Cornell University			
Natural Sciences	Applied Mathematics	George Francis Carrier	Harvard University	Analytical investigations of questions in fluid dynamics	Also won in 1968	
Natural Sciences	Applied Mathematics	Chieh Su Hsu	University of California, Berkeley	Oscillations of thin elastic shells		
Natural Sciences	Applied Mathematics	Victor Henry Rumsey	University of California, Berkeley	Sources of radio waves		
Natural Sciences	Applied Mathematics	Theodore Yaotsu Wu	California Institute of Technology			
Natural Sciences	Astronomy and Astrophysics	William Liller	Harvard University	Telescopic observations of the emission component of an ionized calcium line in cool stars		
Natural Sciences	Astronomy and Astrophysics	Albert Simon	General Atomics			
Natural Sciences	Chemistry	Kenneth Leslie Babcock	University of California, Berkeley	Chemical properties of alkali soil		
Natural Sciences	Chemistry	Russell A. Bonham	Indiana University	Electron scattering from atoms and molecules		
Natural Sciences	Chemistry	John Green Burr	North American Aviation Science Center			
Natural Sciences	Chemistry	Robert Norman Clayton	University of Chicago	Metamorphism of rocks in geothermal areas		
Natural Sciences	Chemistry	Theodore A. Geissman	University of California, Los Angeles		Also won in 1950	
Natural Sciences	Chemistry	James Briggs Hendrickson	Brandeis University	Relation of the structure and biosynthesis of natural products to the phylogeny of the plant families from which they derive		
Natural Sciences	Chemistry	John R. Huizenga	Argonne National Laboratory	Nuclear fission of elements in the vicinity of gold at moderate excitation energies	Also won in 1973	
Natural Sciences	Chemistry	Richard M. Lemmon	University of California, Berkeley	Radiation chemistry and DNA and RNA		
Natural Sciences	Chemistry	Bruno Linder	Florida State University	Many-body aspects of intermolecular forces and an attempt to relate thermodynamic potentials to dissipative functions		
Natural Sciences	Chemistry	Wilmer Glenn Miller	University of Iowa	Polymer-solvent interactions using synthetic polypeptides		
Natural Sciences	Chemistry	Ronald Lewis Sass	Rice University	Electron spin resonance and self-consistent molecular orbital treatment of charge-transfer complexes		
Natural Sciences	Chemistry	Paul von Ragué Schleyer	Princeton University			
Natural Sciences	Chemistry	Eugene Earle van Tamelen	Stanford University	Chemical research laboratory visits	Also won in 1973	
Natural Sciences	Chemistry	Owen Howard Wheeler	University of Puerto Rico at Mayagüez			
Natural Sciences	Computer Science	William Ross Ashby	University of Illinois	Development of a theory of mechanisms that are part determinate and part stochastic, and the application of this theory to systems, especially the cerebral, that have distributed memory		
Natural Sciences	Earth Science	John McDougall Christie	University of California, Los Angeles			
Natural Sciences	Earth Science	William R. Dickinson	Stanford University	Geological research in New Zealand and the Fiji Islands		
Natural Sciences	Earth Science	James Freeman Gilbert	Scripps Institution of Oceanography		Also won in 1972	
Natural Sciences	Earth Science	Myra Keen	Stanford University	Technical methods for the investigation of living invertebrates in use at the principal marine stations in Europe and the United States		
Natural Sciences	Earth Science	Arcie Lee McAlester	Yale University	Early Paleozoic bivalve molluscs		
Natural Sciences	Earth Science	Leon Theodore Silver	California Institute of Technology			
Natural Sciences	Earth Science	Raúl Alberto Zardini	University of Buenos Aires			
Natural Sciences	Engineering	John Atwater Duffie	University of Wisconsin			
Natural Sciences	Engineering	Jacques Wayne Duffy	Brown University			
Natural Sciences	Engineering	John Frank Elliott	Massachusetts Institute of Technology	Process dynamics and control as applied to metallurgical systems		
Natural Sciences	Engineering	Wilbert James Lick	Harvard University	Fundamental characteristics of energy transfer by radiation in conjugation with conduction and convection		
Natural Sciences	Engineering	Daniel D. Perlmutter	University of Illinois	Aspects of reactor behavior		
Natural Sciences	Engineering	John Melville Roberts	Rice University	Interaction between point defects and moving dislocations in anisotropic metal crystals		
Natural Sciences	Engineering	Lambert Tall	Lehigh University			
Natural Sciences	Mathematics	David John Benney	Massachusetts Institute of Technology	Non-linear oscillations in fluid motions		
Natural Sciences	Mathematics	David A. Buchsbaum	Brandeis University	Zeta functions of semisimple algebras over number fields		
Natural Sciences	Mathematics	Bernard M. Dwork	Johns Hopkins University		Also won in 1975	
Natural Sciences	Mathematics	Sigurdur Helgason	Massachusetts Institute of Technology	Theory of functions on symmetric spaces		
Natural Sciences	Mathematics	James Johnston Stoker	New York University	Differential geometry	Also won in 1973	
Natural Sciences	Medicine and Health	Alan Clifford Aisenberg	Massachusetts General Hospital, Harvard University Medical School	Immunological investigations related to human disease		
Natural Sciences	Medicine and Health	Carleton B. Chapman	University of Texas Southwestern Medical School	Cardiac failure		
Natural Sciences	Medicine and Health	Robert Eugene Johnson	University of Illinois	Interrelationships of metabolism, physical environment, physical work, and nutritional stress		
Natural Sciences	Medicine and Health	Thomas Taylor White	University of Washington			
Natural Sciences	Molecular and Cellular Biology	A. Earl Bell	Purdue University	Extension of population genetics theory		
Natural Sciences	Molecular and Cellular Biology	John Ramsey Bronk	Columbia University	Manner in which energy is supplied for active transport and protein synthesis by mucosal cells of the small intestine		
Natural Sciences	Molecular and Cellular Biology	John Machlin Buchanan	Massachusetts Institute of Technology	Biochemical aspects of the action of nerve growth factors isolated from Sarcoma 180 tumor, snake venom, and mouse salivary glands		
Natural Sciences	Molecular and Cellular Biology	Willy Burgdorfer	Rocky Mountain Laboratories	Dynamics of viral and Rickettsial infection in tissues of arthropod vectors by means of cytochemical and immunochemical staining procedures and electronmicroscopy		
Natural Sciences	Molecular and Cellular Biology	Frederick Hiltman Carpenter	University of California, Berkeley	Synthesis of insulin		
Natural Sciences	Molecular and Cellular Biology	John Walter Drake	University of Illinois	Genetic mechanisms at the molecular level, with particular reference to mutation and recombination in viruses		
Natural Sciences	Molecular and Cellular Biology	Thomas Eisner	Cornell University		Also won in 1972	
Natural Sciences	Molecular and Cellular Biology	E. Peter Geiduschek	University of Chicago	Phage genetics		
Natural Sciences	Molecular and Cellular Biology	Paul Griminger	Rutgers University	Vitamins and metabolism		
Natural Sciences	Molecular and Cellular Biology	Terrell Hunter Hamilton	University of Texas	Mechanism whereby estrogen induces synthesis of ribonucleic acids and proteins		
Natural Sciences	Molecular and Cellular Biology	Edward James Hehre	Albert Einstein College of Medicine	Biological synthesis of complex carbohydrates		
Natural Sciences	Molecular and Cellular Biology	Bernard Norman Jaroslow	Argonne National Laboratory	Quantitative changes in maturation and proliferation of antibody-forming cells with and without exposure to radiation		
Natural Sciences	Molecular and Cellular Biology	Nathan Oram Kaplan	Brandeis University	Human biochemical genetics and molecular biology	Also won in 1974	
Natural Sciences	Molecular and Cellular Biology	Edwin L. Schmidt	University of Minnesota	Microorganisms that form nitrate nitrogen		
Natural Sciences	Molecular and Cellular Biology	Jordan J. Tang	University of Oklahoma	Catalytic action of proteolytic enzymes		
Natural Sciences	Molecular and Cellular Biology	John R. Vallentyne	Cornell University	Biogeochemical studies		
Natural Sciences	Molecular and Cellular Biology	Robert Harold Wasserman	Cornell University		Also won in 1971	
Natural Sciences	Molecular and Cellular Biology	George A. Zentmyer	University of California, Riverside	Jarrah Forest pandemics		
Natural Sciences	Neuroscience	Edith K. MacRae	University of Illinois	Photoreceptor systems in Turbellarians in terms of fine structure and possible mechanism		
Natural Sciences	Organismic Biology and Ecology	Norman John Berrill	McGill University			
Natural Sciences	Organismic Biology and Ecology	Melvin Joseph Cohen	University of Oregon	Central and peripheral nervous system of Arthropoda using combined electrophysiological, hostological, and behavioral techniques		
Natural Sciences	Organismic Biology and Ecology	Vincent Gaston Dethier	University of Pennsylvania		Also won in 1972	
Natural Sciences	Organismic Biology and Ecology	Charles Remington Goldman	University of California, Davis	Alpine lakes and their contents		
Natural Sciences	Organismic Biology and Ecology	Marcos Kogan	Oswaldo Cruz Foundation		Also won in 1967	
Natural Sciences	Organismic Biology and Ecology	Peter Robert Marler	University of California, Berkeley	Field study of East African monkeys		
Natural Sciences	Organismic Biology and Ecology	Donald More Maynard	University of Michigan			
Natural Sciences	Organismic Biology and Ecology	Powers S. Messenger	University of California, Berkeley	Climatic factors in control of insects		
Natural Sciences	Organismic Biology and Ecology	Boyd L. O'Dell	University of Missouri	Origin and metabolism of aortic elastin		
Natural Sciences	Organismic Biology and Ecology	Robert Keith Selander	University of Texas	Adaptive significance and relationships of mating systems and sexual dimorphism in birds		
Natural Sciences	Organismic Biology and Ecology	Richard Douglas Taber	Montana State University	Relations of man to free living animals in West Punjab, Pakistan		
Natural Sciences	Physics	Myer Bloom	University of British Columbia	Magnetic resonance		
Natural Sciences	Physics	Mark Bolsterli	University of Minnesota	Nuclear scattering and reaction theory		
Natural Sciences	Physics	Nina Byers	University of California, Los Angeles			
Natural Sciences	Physics	Thomas R. Carver	Princeton University			
Natural Sciences	Physics	Thomas Fulton	Johns Hopkins University			
Natural Sciences	Physics	Sulamith Goldhaber	University of California, Berkeley	High energy particles		
Natural Sciences	Physics	Lee Grodzins	Massachusetts Institute of Technology	Theory of nuclear reactions and of experimental techniques for the measurement of the magnetic moments of nuclear excited states	Also won in 1971	
Natural Sciences	Physics	Norton Mark Hintz	University of Minnesota	Current nucleon models		
Natural Sciences	Physics	Lawrence W. Jones	University of Michigan			
Natural Sciences	Physics	William Arthur Little	Stanford University	Solid-state and low temperature physics		
Natural Sciences	Physics	Paul H. Meijer	Catholic University of America			
Natural Sciences	Physics	Donald S. Rodbell	General Electric Company			
Natural Sciences	Physics	Raymond Sheline	Florida State University	Determination of spins and parities of deformed nuclei	Also won in 1955, 1956	
Natural Sciences	Physics	Henry Cutler Torrey	Rutgers University			
Natural Sciences	Physics	Kent Melville Terwilliger	University of Michigan			
Natural Sciences	Plant Sciences	David Paul Bloch	University of Texas in Austin	Effects of histones in the modification of nuclear function		
Natural Sciences	Plant Sciences	Theodore Delevoryas	Yale University	Morphological and evolutionary investigations of the Cycadeoideas		
Natural Sciences	Plant Sciences	Oswaldo Fidalgo			Also won in 1966	
Natural Sciences	Plant Sciences	Walter H. Gardner	Washington State University	Soil microenvironment		
Natural Sciences	Plant Sciences	Arthur Lee Hooker	University of Illinois	Genetic studies of plant parasite interactions		
Natural Sciences	Plant Sciences	Job Kuijt	University of British Columbia	Parasitic flowering plant study		
Natural Sciences	Plant Sciences	Bruce Bernot Stowe	Yale University	Plant biochemistry		
Natural Sciences	Plant Sciences	David Richard Viglierchio	University of California, Davis	Plant growth regulators		
Natural Sciences	Plant Sciences	Grady Linder Webster	Purdue University	Comparative morphological studies on taxa of the angiosperm family Euphorbiaceae		
Natural Sciences	Statistics	William Gemmell Cochran	Harvard University	Monograph on planning of observational studies for the use of research workers in the social sciences, medicine, and public health		
Social Science	Anthropology and Cultural Studies	Bernard S. Cohn	University of Rochester			
Social Science	Economics	Murray Brown	Harvard University, U.S. Department of Commerce			
Social Science	Economics	Howard Scott Gordon	Indiana University			
Social Science	Economics	Gregory Grossman	University of California, Berkeley	Non-market, command economies		
Social Science	Economics	Hugh T. Patrick	Yale University	Contribution of government fiscal policy to the growth of the postwar Japanese economy		
Social Science	Economics	Richard Thomas Selden	Cornell University			
Social Science	Education	James Edward McClellan	Temple University			
Social Science	Geography and Environmental Studies	Johan Jacob Groot	University of Delaware	Pollen and spores in deep sea sediments of the Argentine Basin and the adjacent sub-Antarctic region for the purpose of interpreting vegetational and climatic changes during the ice ages		
Social Science	Geography and Environmental Studies	Arthur H. Robinson	University of Wisconsin		Also won in 1977	
Social Science	Geography and Environmental Studies	Robert H. T. Smith	University of Wisconsin			
Social Science	Law	Abraham S. Goldstein	Yale University	Methods of police interrogation and judicial and administrative treatment of mentally ill offenders	Also won in 1975	
Social Science	Law	Calvin Woodard	Yale University	History of the welfare state		
Social Science	Political Science	Inis Lothair Claude	University of Michigan			
Social Science	Political Science	Daniel J. Elazar	University of Minnesota	Federal-state-local relations in the United States before 1913	Also won in 1980	
Social Science	Political Science	William Jay Foltz	Yale University	West African politics		
Social Science	Political Science	Stanley Hoffmann	Harvard University	Fall of the French Third Republic and Vichy regime	Also won in 1987	
Social Science	Political Science	Otto Kirchheimer	Columbia University	Parliament and party in Western Europe		
Social Science	Political Science	Nadav Safran	Harvard University	Role of bureaucracy in advanced and developing countries		
Social Science	Political Science	John Homer Schaar	University of California, Berkeley	Literary Hebrew		
Social Science	Political Science	Warner R. Schilling	Columbia University	Considerations leading to President Truman's decision in January 1950 that the United States should make an H-bomb		
Social Science	Political Science	Raymond Edwin Wolfinger	Stanford University	Political leadership		
Social Science	Psychology	Robert Ray Bush	University of Pennsylvania			
Social Science	Psychology	Leo Hurvich	University of Pennsylvania			
Social Science	Psychology	Arthur Robert Jensen	University of California, Berkeley	Psychology of learning		
Social Science	Psychology	Alvin M. Liberman	University of Connecticut	Language and perception		
Social Science	Sociology	Guy Edwin Swanson	University of Michigan			
Social Science	Sociology	Ralph Herbert Turner	University of California, Los Angeles			

== 1964 Latin American and Caribbean Fellows ==
Category	Field of Study	Fellow	Institutional association	Research topic	Notes	Ref
Creative Arts	Choreography	Hernán Baldrich Meneses	Chilean National Ballet			
Creative Arts	Fine Arts	Eduardo Martínez Bonati	University of Chile			
Creative Arts	Fine Arts	Enrique Castro-Cid			Also won in 1965	
Creative Arts	Fine Arts	Jorge Dubon Cruz			Also won in 1969, 1979	
Creative Arts	Fine Arts	Mauricio Lasansky	University of Iowa	Printmaking	Also won in 1943, 1944, 1945, 1953	
Creative Arts	Fine Arts	José Manuel Schmill Ordoñez				
Humanities	Music Research	María Ester Grebe Vicuña	University of Chile		Also won in 1977	
Humanities	Philosophy	Claudio Gutiérrez Carranza	University of Costa Rica			
Humanities	Philosophy	Udo Rukser Coester				
Natural Science	Earth Science	Nestor C. L. Granelli	Embassy of Argentina, Washington, D.C.			
Natural Science	Mathematics	Guillermo Restrepo Sierra	University of Southern California			
Natural Science	Medicine and Health	Manuel López Ortiz	Pontificia Universidad Javeriana		Also won in 1965	
Natural Science	Molecular and Cellular Biology	Victor Nussenzweig	University of São Paulo		Also won in 1963	
Natural Science	Molecular and Cellular Biology	Firmino Torres de Castro	Ministry of Health			
Natural Science	Molecular and Cellular Biology	Peter Seeligmann	Instituto Miguel Lillo			
Natural Science	Neuroscience	Enrique López Mendoza	National Institute of Cardiology		Also won in 1962, 1963	
Natural Science	Organismic Biology and Ecology	Clare R. Baltazar	National Institute of Science and Technology		Also won in 1957	
Natural Science	Organismic Biology and Ecology	Jayme de Loyola e Silva	Federal University of Paraná			
Natural Science	Organismic Biology and Ecology	Ubirajara Ribeiro Martins de Souza	Ministry of Agriculture in São Paulo			
Natural Science	Plant Sciences	Juan Accorinti	Bernardino Rivadavia Natural Sciences Argentine Museum			
Natural Science	Plant Sciences	Maria Eneyda Pacheco Kauffman Fidalgo	Botanical Garden of São Paulo		Also won in 1966	
Natural Science	Plant Sciences	María Teresa Murillo Pulido	National University of Colombia		Also won in 1965	
Natural Science	Plant Sciences	Francisco N. Tamolang	University of the Philippines			
Social Science	Anthropology and Cultural Studies	Federico Kauffmann Doig	Lima Art Museum			
Social Science	Anthropology and Cultural Studies	Virginia Gutiérrez de Pineda			Also won in 1952	
Social Science	Anthropology and Cultural Studies	Pedro Ignacio Porras Garcés	Josefina del Napo Mission			
Social Science	Sociology	Juan Carlos Agulla	National University of Córdoba			

== See also ==
- Guggenheim Fellowship
- List of Guggenheim Fellowships awarded in 1963
- List of Guggenheim Fellowships awarded in 1965
