= Byzantinisches Archiv =

The Byzantinisches Archiv ("Byzantine Archive"; shortened as ByzA or ByzArch) is an academic series of monographs concerned with various topics of Byzantine studies (archaeology, hagiography, history, literature, philology, etc.). It includes monographs, critical editions of Byzantine texts and sources, and miscellaneous volumes such as Festschriften.

== Editorial History ==
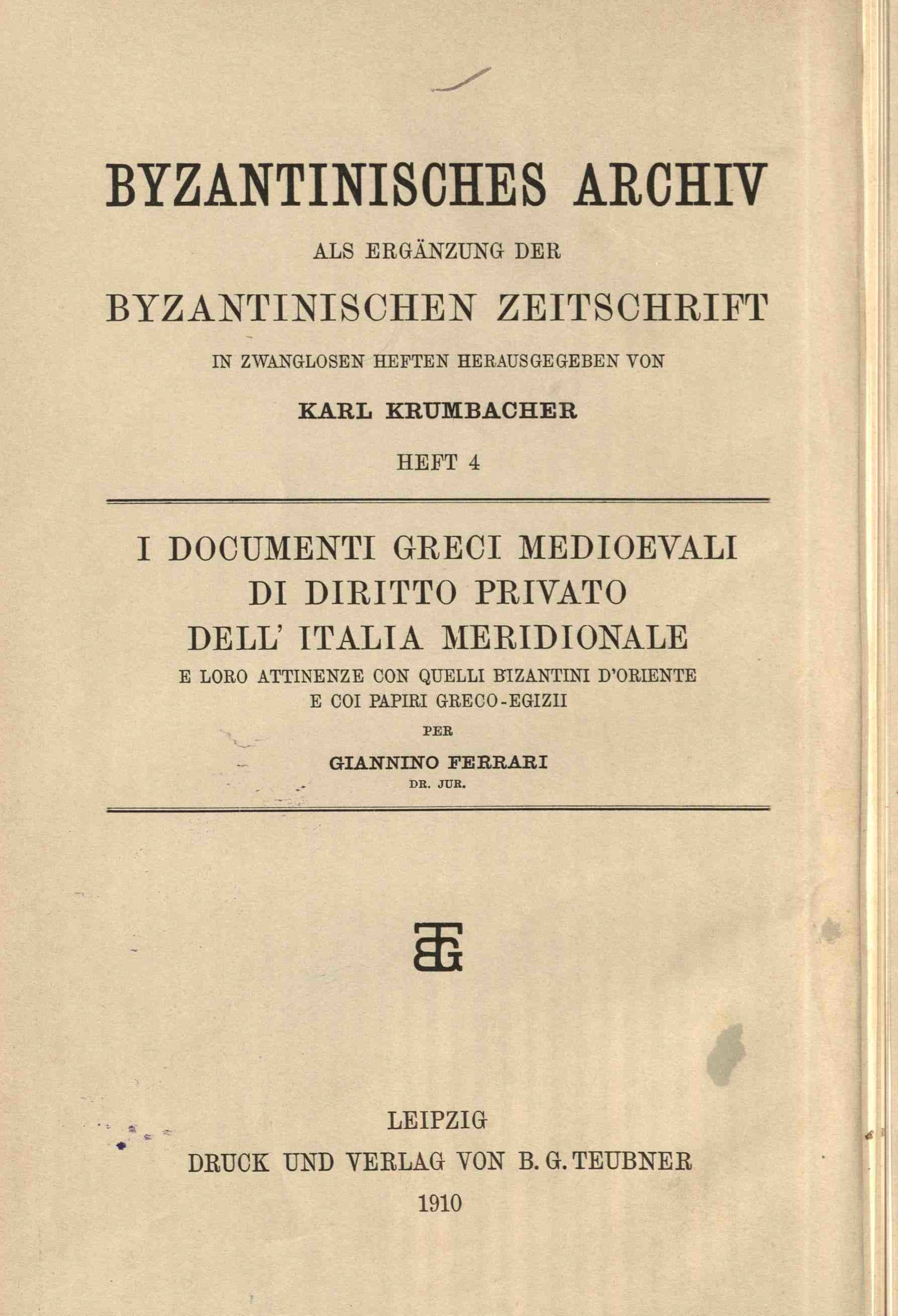
Cover of Vol. 4 (Ferrari dalle Spade 1903).

The series was founded by Karl Krumbacher in 1898 as supplementary volumes to the academic journal Byzantinische Zeitschrift ("begründet ... als Ergänzung der Byzantinische Zeitschrift"), published "in irregular issues" ("in zwanglosen Heften") by B. G. Teubner Verlag in Leipzig (Vols. 1–4). Krumbacher served as general editor of both "Byzantinische Zeitschrift" and "Byzantinisches Archiv" until his death in 1909, at which point he was succeeded by August Heisenberg (editor, 1910–1931).

After a hiatus of almost 20 years during the Nazi regime in Germany and World War II, the series restarted with vol. 10 under the editorship of Franz Dölger (since 1931 Professor in Middle and Modern Greek Philology at the Ludwig-Maximilians-Universität München and editor of the "Byzantinische Zeitschrift"), printed by C. H. Beck in Munich. He was succeeded by Hans-Georg Beck, Friedrich Deichmann and Herbert Hunger, editors of the "Byzantinische Zeitschrift" since 1964, from Vol. 11 to Vol. 15.

Armin Hohweg served as editor of Vol. 16 and was succeeded by Peter Schreiner (Vols. 17–19, 1997–2000), under whose editorship both the journal and the series returned to B. G. Teubner Verlag. With the Teubner firm being purchased by Water de Gruyter GmbH, the series also entered the latter editor's catalogue.

Albrecht Berger, general editor of the "Byzantinische Zeitschrift" from 2004 to 2024, served as the editor of "Byzantinisches Archive" Vols. 20–32 and 34–45. Under his editorship, two subseries ("Byzantinisches Archiv — Series Medica", edited by Sergej Mariev; and "Byzantinisches Archiv — Series Philosophica", edited by Berger and Isabel Grimm-Stadelmann) were also launched.

Since 2025, the "Byzantinische Zeitschrift" and its related series are edited by Zachary Chitwood.

== List of Volumes ==
1. Dietrich, K. (1898). Untersuchungen zur Geschichte der griechischen Sprache. Von der hellenistischen Zeit bis zum 10. Jh. n. Chr. Leipzig: B. G. Teubner – via Google Books.
2. Strzygowski, J. (1899). Der Bilderkreis des griechischen Physiologus des Kosmas Indikopleustes und Oktateuch nach Handschriften der Bibliothek zu Smyrna. Leipzig: B. G. Teubner – via Google Books.
3. Gardthausen, V. (1903). Sammlungen und Cataloge griechischer Handschriften. Leipzig: B. G. Teubner – via Internet Archive.
4. Ferrari dalle Spade, G. (1903). I documenti greci medioevali di diritto privato dell’Italia meridionale e loro attinenze con quelli bizantini d’Oriente e coi papiri greco-egizii. Leipzig: B. G. Teubner – via Central University Library, Bucharest.
5. Aufhauser, J. B. (1911). Das Drachenwunder des Heiligen Georg in der griechischen und lateinischen Überlieferung. Leipzig: B. G. Teubner – via Internet Archive.
6. Glas, A. (1914). Die Kirchengeschichte des Gelasios von Kaisareia. Leipzig: B. G. Teubner.
7. Sigalas, A. (1921). Des Chrysippos von Jerusalem Enkōmion auf den hl. Theodōros Teron. Leipzig: B. G. Teubner. doi:10.1515/9783112325667. eISSN 2366-7052. ISBN 9783112325674. ISSN 1864-9785.
8. Fuchs, F. (1926). Die höheren Schulen von Konstantinopel im Mittelalter. Leipzig – Berlin: B. G. Teubner. doi:10.1515/9783112325667. eISSN 2366-7052. ISBN 9783112325650. ISSN 1864-9785.
9. Dölger, F. (1927). Beiträge zur Geschichte der byzantinischen Finanzverwaltung besonders des 10. und 11. Jahrhunderts. Leipzig – Berlin: B. G. Teubner – via Bavarian State Library. — Habilitationsschrift (1925).
10. Karayannopoulos, I. (1959). Die Entstehung der byzantinischen Themenordnung. München: C. H. Beck'sche Verlagsbuchhandlung. doi:10.1515/9783112325766. eISSN 2366-7052. ISBN 9783112325759. ISSN 1864-9785.
11. Mitsakis, K. (1967). The Language of Romanos the Melodist. München: C. H. Beck'sche Verlagsbuchhandlung. doi:10.1515/9783112325902. eISSN 2366-7052. ISBN 9783112325896. ISSN 1864-9785.
12. Riedinger, R. (1969). Pseudo-Kaisarios. Überlieferungsgeschichte und Verfasserfrage. München: C. H. Beck'sche Verlagsbuchhandlung.
13. Claude, D. (1969). Die byzantinische Stadt im 6. Jahrhundert. München: C. H. Beck'sche Verlagsbuchhandlung.
14. Speck, P. (1974). Die Kaiserliche Universität von Konstantinopel. Präzisierungen zur Frage des höheren Schulwesens in Byzanz im 9. und 10. Jahrhundert. München: C. H. Beck'sche Verlagsbuchhandlung. doi:10.1515/9783112325803. eISSN 2366-7052. ISSN 1864-9785.
15. Podskalsky, G. (1977). Theologie und Philosophie in Byzanz. Der Streit um die theologische Methodik in der spätbyzantinischen Geistesgeschichte (14./15. Jh.), seine systematischen Grundlagen und seine historische Entwicklung. München: C. H. Beck'sche Verlagsbuchhandlung. doi:10.1515/9783112325865. eISSN 2366-7052. ISBN 9783112325858. ISSN 1864-9785. — Habilitationsschrift (1975).
16. Sinos, S. (1985). Die Klosterkirche der Kosmosoteira in Bera (Vira). München: C. H. Beck'sche Verlagsbuchhandlung. doi:10.1515/9783112325827. eISSN 2366-7052. ISBN 9783112325810. ISSN 1864-9785.xx
17. Makris, G. (1997). Ignatios Diakonos und die Vita des Hl. Gregorios Dekapolites. Edition und Kommentar. Stuttgart und Leipzig: B. G. Teubner. doi:10.1515/9783110953992. eISSN 2366-7052. ISSN 1864-9785. — Habilitationsschrift.
18. Külzer, A. (1999). Disputationes graecae contra Iudaeos. Untersuchungen zur byzantinischen antijüdischen Dialogsliteratur und ihrem Judenbild. Stuttgart und Leipzig: B. G. Teubner. doi:10.1515/9783110946291. eISSN 2366-7052. ISSN 1864-9785.
19. Scholz, C.; Makris, G., eds. (2000). Polypleuros nous. Miscellanea für Peter Schreiner zu seinem 60. Geburtstag. Stuttgart und Leipzig: B. G. Teubner. doi:10.1515/9783110959505. eISSN 2366-7052. ISSN 1864-9785.
20. Hinterberger, M.; Schiffer, E., eds. (2007). Byzantinische Sprachkunst. Studien zur byzantinischen Literatur gewidmet Wolfram Hörandner zum 65. Geburtstag. Berlin – New York: Walter de Gruyter. doi:10.1515/9783110918229. eISSN 2366-7052. ISSN 1864-9785.
21. Hinterberger, M., ed. (2009). Das hagiographische Dossier der heiligen Theodosia von Konstantinopel. Berlin – New York: Walter de Gruyter. doi:10.1515/9783110219869. eISSN 2366-7052. ISSN 1864-9785.
22. Hinterberger, M.; Mavromatis, G., eds. (2009). Realia Byzantina. Berlin – New York: Walter de Gruyter. doi:10.1515/9783110222319. eISSN 2366-7052. ISSN 1864-9785. — Festschrift for Athanasios Karpozilos.
23. Spanos, A., ed. (2010). Codex ›Lesbiacus Leimonos‹ 11. Annotated Critical Edition of an Unpublished Byzantine ›Menaion‹ for June. Berlin – New York: Walter de Gruyter. doi:10.1515/9783110221305. eISSN 2366-7052. ISSN 1864-9785.
24. Kolovou, F., ed. (2012). Byzanzrezeption in Europa. Spurensuche über das Mittelalter und die Renaissance bis in die Gegenwart. Berlin – New York: Walter de Gruyter. doi:10.1515/9783110272253. eISSN 2366-7052. ISSN 1864-9785.
25. Mariev, S.; Stock, W.-M., eds. (2013). Aesthetics and Theurgy in Byzantium. Berlin – New York: Walter de Gruyter. doi:10.1515/9781614512615. eISSN 2366-7052. ISSN 1864-9785.
26. Aerts, W. J. (2014). The Byzantine Alexander Poem. Berlin – New York: Walter de Gruyter. doi:10.1515/9781614513070. eISSN 2366-7052. ISSN 1864-9785.
27. Kotzabassi, S., ed. (2013). The Pantokrator Monastery in Constantinople. Berlin – New York: Walter de Gruyter. doi:10.1515/9781614514602. eISSN 2366-7052. ISSN 1864-9785.
28. Pizzone, A., ed. (2014). The Author in Middle Byzantine Prose. Berlin – New York: Walter de Gruyter. doi:10.1515/9781614515197. eISSN 2366-7052. ISSN 1864-9785.
29. Antonopoulou, Th.; Kotzabassi, S.; Loukaki, M., eds. (2015). Myriobiblos. Essays on Byzantine Literature and Culture. Berlin – New York: Walter de Gruyter. doi:10.1515/9781501501562. eISSN 2366-7052. ISSN 1864-9785.
30. Cuomo, A. M., ed. (2016). Ioannis Canani ›De Constantinopolitana obsidione narratio‹. Berlin – New York: Walter de Gruyter. doi:10.1515/9781501502880. eISSN 2366-7052. ISSN 1864-9785.
31. Berger, A.; Mariev, S.; Prinzig, G.; Riehle, A., eds. (2016). Koinotaton Doron. Das späte Byzanz zwischen Machtlosigkeit und kultureller Blüte (1204–1461). Berlin – New York: Walter de Gruyter. doi:10.1515/9783110469851. eISSN 2366-7052. ISSN 1864-9785. — Festschrift for Franz Tinnefeld.
32. Taxidis, I., ed. (2017). Les Épigrammes de Maxime Planude. Berlin – New York: Walter de Gruyter. doi:10.1515/9783110528558. eISSN 2366-7052. ISSN 1864-9785.
33. Tocci, R., ed. (2026). Anonymi Chronicon. Prolegomena, Erstedition, Übersetzung und Kommentar. Berlin – New York: Walter de Gruyter. doi:10.1515/9783110545289. eISSN 2366-7052. ISSN 1864-9785.
34. Zervan, V., ed. (2019). Die Lehnwörter im Wortschatz der spätbyzantinischen historiographischen Literatur. Berlin – New York: Walter de Gruyter. doi:10.1515/9783110587678. eISSN 2366-7052. ISSN 1864-9785.
35. Daskas, B., ed. (2025). Nicola Mesarite, «La sedizione di Giovanni Comneno detto ‹il Grasso›». Introduzione, edizione critica, traduzione e note. Berlin – New York: Walter de Gruyter. doi:10.1515/9783111367408. eISSN 2366-7052. ISSN 1864-9785.
36. Loukaki, M., ed. (2020). Les Grâces à Athènes. Éloge d’un gouverneur byzantin par Nikolaos Kataphlôron. Berlin – New York: Walter de Gruyter. doi:10.1515/9783110634716. eISSN 2366-7052. ISSN 1864-9785.
37. Kermanidis, M. (2020). Episteme und Ästhetik der Raummodellierung in Literatur und Kunst des Theodoros Metochites. Ein frühpalaiologischer Byzantiner im Bezug zur Frühen Neuzeit. Berlin – New York: Walter de Gruyter. doi:10.1515/9783110643916. eISSN 2366-7052. ISSN 1864-9785.
38. Kubina, M. (2020). Die enkomiastische Dichtung des Manuel Philes. Form und Funktion des literarischen Lobes in der frühen Palaiologenzeit. Berlin – New York: Walter de Gruyter. doi:10.1515/9783110634839. eISSN 2366-7052. ISSN 1864-9785.
39. Dendrinos, Ch.; Giarenis, I., eds. (2021). Bibliophilos. Books and Learning in the Byzantine World. Berlin – New York: Walter de Gruyter. doi:10.1515/9783110718492. eISSN 2366-7052. ISSN 1864-9785. — Festschrift for Costas N. Constantinides.
40. Hadjiafxenti, Ch., ed. (2021). Die Heiligenenkomien des Nikolaos Kabasilas. Einleitung und kritische Edition. Berlin – New York: Walter de Gruyter. doi:10.1515/9783110711561. eISSN 2366-7052. ISSN 1864-9785.
41. Grimm-Stadelmann, I.; Riehle, A.; Tocci, R.; Vučetić, M. M., eds. (2023). Anekdota Byzantina. Studien zur byzantinischen Geschichte und Kultur. Festschrift für Albrecht Berger anlässlich seines 65. Geburtstags. Berlin – New York: Walter de Gruyter. doi:10.1515/9783111070315. eISSN 2366-7052. ISBN 9783111068329. ISSN 1864-9785.
42. Alexakis, A.; Georgakopoulos, D. S., eds. (2023). Kalligraphos – Essays on Byzantine Language, Literature and Palaeography. From Byzantine Historiography to Post-Byzantine Poetry. Berlin – New York: Walter de Gruyter. doi:10.1515/9783111010335. eISSN 2366-7052. ISBN 9783111009810. ISSN 1864-9785. — Gedenkschrift for Ioannis Mavromatis.
43. Riehle, A., ed. (2023). Die Briefsammlungen des Nikephoros Chumnos. Einleitung, Edition, Übersetzung. Berlin – New York: Walter de Gruyter. doi:10.1515/9781614514428. eISSN 2366-7052. ISBN 9781614516019. ISSN 1864-9785.
44. Gioffreda, A.; Mondini, U.; Rhoby, A., eds. (2024). Die metrische Psalmenmetaphrase des Manuel Philes. Einleitung, kritische Edition und Indices. Berlin – New York: Walter de Gruyter. doi:10.1515/9783110796544. eISSN 2366-7052. ISBN 9783110793024. ISSN 1864-9785.
45. Davis, J. C.; Hinterberger, M., eds. (2024). The Metaphrase of Niketas Choniates' ›History‹. Introduction, Edition, Commentary. Berlin – New York: Walter de Gruyter. doi:10.1515/9781614514480. eISSN 2366-7052. ISBN 9781614515968. ISSN 1864-9785.
46. Kyriacou, C.; Dendrinos, C., eds. (2026). Identities, Boundaries and Connectivities in the Late Byzantine and Post-Byzantine Mediterranean: Reality and Reception. Berlin – New York: Walter de Gruyter. doi:10.1515/9783112230909. eISSN 2366-7052. ISBN 9783112230893. ISSN 1864-9785.

=== Series Medica ===
1. Grimm-Stadelmann, I. (2020). Untersuchungen zur Iatromagie in der byzantinischen Zeit. Zur Tradierung gräkoägyptischer und spätantiker iatromagischer Motive. Berlin – New York: Walter de Gruyter. doi:10.1515/9783110619041. eISSN 2702-5594. ISBN 9783110612929. ISSN 2700-5739.x
2. Valentino, D. (2027). Das Anthologium Iatrosophicum des Codex Panormitanus XIII C 3. Berlin – New York: Walter de Gruyter. eISSN 2702-5594. ISBN 9783110793970. ISSN 2700-5739.x
3. Gonetz, P. (2023). Antike und byzantinische ›Compendia Medica‹. Ihre Intention und Dimension für die Medizin- und Pharmaziegeschichtsschreibung. Berlin – New York: Walter de Gruyter. doi:10.1515/9783111062020. eISSN 2702-5594. ISBN 9783111058238. ISSN 2700-5739.x
4. Lauritzen, F. (2026). Byzantine Medicine and Charitable Foundations. From Constantinople to the Scuola Grande di San Marco in Venice. Berlin – New York: Walter de Gruyter. eISSN 2702-5594. ISBN 9783111000497. ISSN 2700-5739.

=== Series Philosophica ===
1. Mariev, S., ed. (2017). Byzantine Perspectives on Neoplatonism. Berlin – New York: Walter de Gruyter. doi:10.1515/9781501503597. eISSN 2702-5543. ISBN 9781501511677. ISSN 2702-5535.
2. Searby, D. M., ed. (2017). Never the Twain Shall Meet? Latins and Greeks learning from each other in Byzantium. Berlin – New York: Walter de Gruyter. doi:10.1515/9783110561074. eISSN 2702-5543. ISBN 9783110559583. ISSN 2702-5535.
3. Mariev, S., ed. (2021). Bessarion’s Treasure. Editing, Translating and Interpreting Bessarion’s Literary Heritage. Berlin – New York: Walter de Gruyter. doi:10.1515/9783110683035. eISSN 2702-5543. ISBN 9783110601800. ISSN 2702-5535.
4. Athanasopoulos, P., ed. (2022). Translation Activity in Late Byzantine World. Contexts, Authors, and Texts. Berlin – New York: Walter de Gruyter. doi:10.1515/9783110677089. eISSN 2702-5543. ISBN 9783110677003. ISSN 2702-5535.
5. Mariev, S., ed. (2027). Bessarion, In Calumniatorem Platonis V. Editio princeps of Greek and Latin Versions. Berlin – New York: Walter de Gruyter. eISSN 2702-5543. ISBN 9783110756005. ISSN 2702-5543.
6. Monfasani, J., ed. (2023). Bessarion, Liber Defensionum contra Obiectiones in Platonem. Cardinal Bessarion’s Own Latin Translation of His Greek Defense of Plato against George of Trebizond. Berlin – New York: Walter de Gruyter. doi:10.1515/9783111250137. eISSN 2702-5543. ISBN 9783111246352. ISSN 2702-5535.
