= Nicolae Bănescu =

Romanian historian (1878–1971)

- Born: 16 December 1878; Călărași, Principality of Romania
- Died: 11 September 1971 (aged 92); Bucharest, Socialist Republic of Romania
- Occupation: Academic

Academic background
- Education: University of Bucharest; Ludwig-Maximilians-Universität München
- Thesis: Die Entwicklung des griechischen Futurums von der frühbyzantinischen Zeit bis zur Gegenwart (1914)
- Doctoral advisor: August Heisenberg

Academic work
- Discipline: History
- Sub-discipline: Byzantine studies
- Institutions: University of Cluj; University of Bucharest

Nicolae P. Bănescu (16 December 1878 – 11 September 1971) was a Romanian historian, elected a titular member of the Romanian Academy in 1936.

He was born in Călărași, the third of 14 children of Petre Bănescu, a lawyer, and his wife Ecaterina, née Drăgulănescu. After spending his childhood in Găești, he attended from 1889 to 1996 the Saint Sava High School in Bucharest. He pursued his studies at the Faculty of Letters and Philosophy of the University of Bucharest, graduating in 1901, after which he taught at the Carol I High School in Craiova and the I.C. Brătianu High School in Pitești. In 1907, he was appointed by Spiru Haret, the Minister of Religious Affairs and Public Instruction, school inspector in Argeș County and then in Bucharest and, at the same time, director and teacher at Dimitrie Cantemir High School and teacher at Matei Basarab, Gheorghe Lazăr, and Saint Sava high schools.

From 1910 to 1912, Bănescu attended the Ludwig-Maximilians-Universität München, where he obtained his Ph.D. degree in Byzantine studies in July 1914, with thesis Die Entwicklung des griechischen Futurums von der frühbyzantinischen Zeit bis zur Gegenwart written under the direction of August Heisenberg. From 1912 to 1914 he was director of the Mănăstirea Dealu Military Lyceum in Târgoviște and in the summer of 1913 he participated in the Second Balkan War as officer in the reserves. When Romania entered World War I in 1916 on the side of the Allies, he joined the Romanian Land Forces as a lieutenant. From 1917 to 1918 he was the director of studies at the military academy in Dorohoi. In 1919 he was named professor of Byzantine studies at the University of Cluj; from 1924 to 1926, he was rector of the university and in 1928, he served as director of the Cluj National Theatre. In 1938, he joined the Byzantine studies department at the University of Bucharest, which he headed until his retirement in 1946. After the assassination of Nicolae Iorga in 1940, he headed the Institute of Byzantine Studies and the Institute of South-East European Studies until 1948.

Bănescu was elected corresponding member of the Romanian Academy in 1920, and titular member in 1936; from 1946 to 1948, he served as vice-president of the Academy. Along with more than 100 other members, he was purged from the Academy in 1948 by the Communist regime, but he was restored to the academy in 1990, after he died in Bucharest in 1971, at age 92. A street in Craiova is named after him.

== Works ==
- Bănescu, Nicolae (1915). Die Entwicklung des griechischen Futurums von der frühbyzantinischen Zeit bis zur Gegenwart (in German).
- "Istoria Imperiului Bizantin (2 vol.)". Anticariat Online (in Romanian). 2015-07-09.
- "Chipuri din istoria Bizanțului". Anticariat Online (in Romanian). 2015-07-09.
