= Byzantinische Zeitschrift =

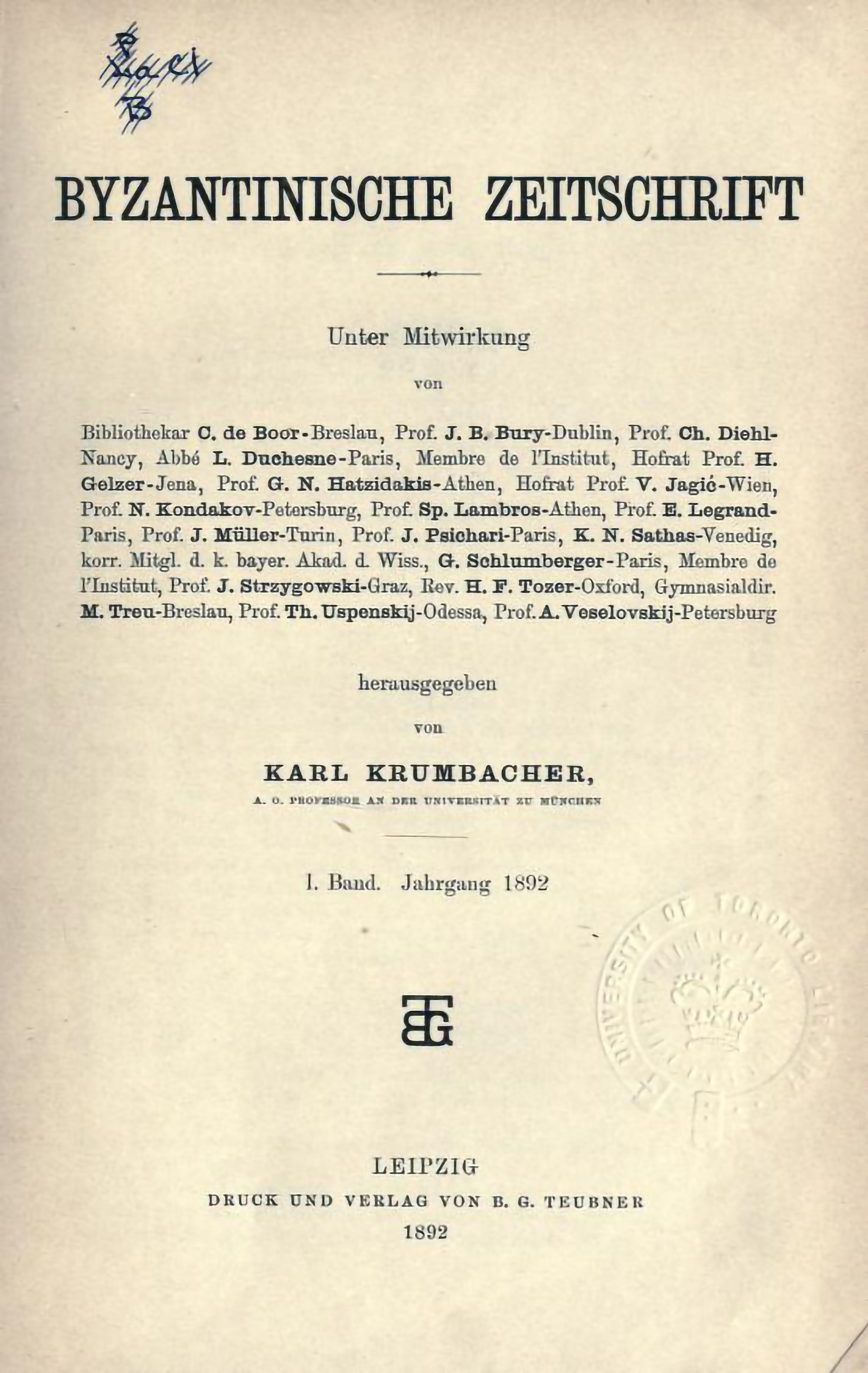
- Discipline: Byzantine studies
- Language: German
- Edited by: Albrecht Berger (since 2004)

Publication details
- History: 1892–1914, 1919–1943, 1949–present
- Publisher: Walter de Gruyter (since 2008) (Germany)

Standard abbreviations
- ISO 4: Byz. Z.

Indexing
- ISSN: 0007-7704 (print); 1868-9027 (web)

Links
- Journal homepage

Byzantinische Zeitschrift (abbr. BZ and ByzZ) is a Byzantine studies journal established in 1892 by Karl Krumbacher. It is currently published by De Gruyter.

After Krumbacher's death it was edited by Paul Marc (1909–1927) and August Heisenberg (1910–1930), followed by Franz Dölger (1928–1963), Hans-Georg Beck (1964–1977), Friedrich Wilhelm Deichmann (1964–1980) and Herbert Hunger (1964–1980), Armin Hohlweg (1978–1990), Peter Schreiner (1991–2004), and since 2004 by Albrecht Berger. The publication ceased in 1914–1919 and 1920–1923 due to World War I and the subsequent troubles in Germany, and again in 1943–1949 due to World War II. From 1950 to 2001 it was published by the Verlag C.H. Beck in Munich, then by the K. G. Saur Verlag, and since 2008 by Walter de Gruyter. Its editorial board is currently located in the Institut für Byzantinistik, Neogräzistik und Byzantinische Kunstgeschichte of LMU Munich.

The journal is published quarterly, divided into three sections: essays, reviews, and bibliographical notices, announcements and obituaries. Its themes range from philology over historical and religious studies to archaeology and art history. In addition, since 1898 the journal was complemented by the Byzantinisches Archiv series, which was completely split off from the journal in 1994, as well as the infrequent Supplementum bibliographicum, independently published by Robert Browning.
