= Hans-Georg Beck =

German scholar of Byzantine studies (1910–1999)

- Born: 18 February 1910; Schneizlreuth, Bavaria, German Empire
- Died: 25 May 1999 (aged 89); Unterfinning, Bavaria, Germany
- Spouse: Erni Hamann-Beck

Academic background
- Education: Ludwig-Maximilians-Universität München
- Thesis: Vorsehung und Vorherbestimmung in der theologischen Literatur der Byzantiner (1936)
- Doctoral advisor: Martin Grabmann
- Other advisor: Franz Dölger

Academic work
- Discipline: Byzantine studies
- Sub-discipline: Byzantine literature, History of the Eastern Orthodox Church
- Institutions: Ludwig-Maximilians-Universität München (1949–1975)
- Doctoral students: Vera von Falkenhausen; Peter Schreiner; Günter Prinzing; Ralph-Johannes Lilie
- Notable works: Kirche und theologische Literatur im Byzantinischen Reich (1959); Geschichte der byzantinischen Volksliteratur (1971); Das byzantinische Jahrtausend (1978)

Hans-Georg Beck FBA (18 February 1910 – 25 May 1999) was a German scholar who specialised in Byzantine studies. He held the chair of Byzantine studies and modern Greek language and literature at the Ludwig-Maximilians-Universität München from 1960 to 1975, and was editor-in-chief of the Byzantinische Zeitschrift from 1964 to 1977.

== Biography ==
He was born in the village of Schneizlreuth near Bad Reichenhall in Bavaria in 1910. He was educated at the humanistic gymnasia in Scheyern (1920–25) and Ettal (1925–29). In 1929, following his graduation, he entered the Benedictine monastery of Scheyern. After studying philosophy at the Ludwig-Maximilians-Universität München under Joseph Geyser, Dietrich von Hildebrand and Kurt Huber during the summer term in 1930, he spent the 1930/31 academic year on scholastic theology at the Anselmianum in Rome. While in Rome, he experienced Eastern Orthodox liturgy and befriended the Belgian François Masai, who turned his interest to Byzantine studies.

Beck returned to the Ludwig-Maximilians-Universität München to pursue Catholic theology, Byzantine studies and classics from 1931 to 1936; his professors included Eduard Eichmann, Georg Pfeilschifter, Franz Dölger, Eduard Schwartz and Rudolf Pfeiffer. He travelled to Italy for research purposes again in 1934 before embarking on his doctoral thesis in Byzantine theology under the supervision of Martin Grabmann. In November 1936, he defended his dissertation, entitled Vorhersehung und Vorherbestimmung in der theologischen Literatur der Byzantiner (Providence and Predestination in Byzantine Theological Literature) and published in Rome the following year as volume 114 of the Orientalia Christiana Analecta series, with the dedication "To friends in need". It dealt at some length with the Byzantine relationship to Islam, and according to Günter Prinzing will have been prompted to address the development of belief in providence by Adolf Hitler's frequent invocation of the term.

After the completion of his studies, Beck served as the librarian of Scheyern Abbey and from 1940 organised its Byzantine Institute (later incorporated into the Patristic Commission of the Bavarian Academy of Sciences) jointly with Johannes Maria Hoeck. His time at the monastery was marked by a long-standing conflict with Abbot Franz Seraph Schreyer, the former vicar of Scheyern and a pre-1933 supporter of the Catholic Centre Party, who was appointed in October 1936. The conflict, which had to do with the relationship between the Catholic Church and the Nazi government, led Beck to abandon his faith and the church, but not theology. He quit monastic life in 1944, according to an oral tradition on his February birthday.

In the years following the end of World War II, he worked as a literary editor for the Munich publishers Michael Beckstein and Ehrenwirth, and contributed to the Munich Catholic magazine Hochland after it was revived in 1946.

In 1949, he achieved habilitation in Byzantine and modern Greek language and literature at the Ludwig-Maximilians-Universität München's Faculty of Philosophy with the work Theodoros Metochites. Die Krise des byzantinischen Weltbildes im 14. Jahrhundert (English: Theodoros Metochites: The Crisis of the Byzantine Worldview in the Fourteenth Century), prepared under the guidance of Franz Dölger, and began his academic career at the same institution. He was appointed außerplanmäßiger Professor in 1956 and joined the editorial board of the Byzantinische Zeitschrift around the same time. He organised and hosted the 11th International Congress of Byzantine Studies in Munich in 1958. After publishing his monumental handbook of Byzantine church organisation and religious literature in 1959, he succeeded Dölger as the chair of Byzantine studies and modern Greek language and literature at the Ludwig-Maximilians-Universität München in the following year. He joined Herbert Hunger and Friedrich Wilhelm Deichmann as co-editor-in-chief of the Byzantinische Zeitschrift in 1964.

Beck was a member of many national academies of sciences and scientific societies. In 1962, he became a full member of the Bavarian Academy of Sciences and Humanities, where he chaired commissions on the publication of the 'Corpus of Greek Acts' and on patristics. In 1966, he was elected a corresponding member of the Austrian Academy of Sciences, in 1975 he became a foreign member of the Athens Academy, in 1977 he was admitted to the British Academy (corresponding member) and the Royal Academies for Science and the Arts of Belgium, and in 1988 to the American Philosophical Society.

He was the vice-president of the humanities division of the German Research Foundation from 1965 to 1968, a member of the German Science and Humanities Council in 1968, and president of the German Study Centre in Venice from 1970 to 1984.

Beck retired from his teaching position at the Ludwig-Maximilians-Universität München in 1975 and from his editorial responsibilities with the Byzantinische Zeitschrift in 1977.

In the privately circulated 1990 text Abschied von Byzanz (Farewell to Byzantium), dedicated to the memory of his wife, Beck repudiated his 1959 magnum opus, describing it as a "burnt offering" and an "abandoned quarry".

He died on 25 May 1999 at his son's house in Unterfinning in Upper Bavaria.

== Books ==
- Theodoros Metochites. Die Krise des byzantinischen Weltbildes im 14. Jahrhundert [Theodoros Metochites: The Crisis of the Byzantine Worldview in the Fourteenth Century] (PDF) (in German). München: C.H. Beck. 1952.
- Geistliches Biedermeier im altbayerischen Raum [Ecclesiastical Biedermeier in the Old Bavarian Region] (in German). Regensburg: Pustet. 1954.
- Saitenspiel des Daseins [Playing the Strings of Existence] (in German). Ettal: Pustet; Buch-Kunstverlag. 1958.
- Kirche und theologische Literatur im Byzantinischen Reich [The Church and Theological Literature in the Byzantine Empire] (in German). München: C.H. Beck. 1959 – via the Internet Archive.
- Geschichte der byzantinischen Volksliteratur (in German). München: C.H. Beck. 1971. ISBN 978-3-406-01420-8 – via the Internet Archive.
- Ideen und Realitäten in Byzanz. Gesammelte Aufsätze [Ideas and Realities in Byzantium: Collected Essays]. Collected Studies (in German). Vol. 12. London: Variorum. 1972. ISBN 0-902-08941-2 – via the Internet Archive.
- Byzantinistik heute [Byzantine Studies Today] (in German). Berlin: de Gruyter. 1977. ISBN 3-11-007220-3.
- Das byzantinische Jahrtausend [The Byzantine Millennium] (in German). München: C.H. Beck. 1978. ISBN 3-406-05997-X – via the Internet Archive.
- Byzantinisches Lesebuch [The Byzantine Reader] (in German). München: C.H. Beck. 1982. ISBN 3-406-08584-9.
- Vom Umgang mit Ketzern. Der Glaube der kleinen Leute und die Macht der Theologen [On Dealing With Heretics: The Faith of the Little People and the Power of the Theologians] (in German). München: C.H. Beck. 1993. ISBN 3-406-37618-5.

== Bibliography ==
- Falkenhausen, Vera von (2013). "Hans-Georg Beck". In Armstrong, Pamela (ed.). Authority in Byzantium. Farnham: Ashgate. pp. 337–343. ISBN 9781409436089.
- Falkenhausen, Vera von (28 June 2010), "Zum 100sten Geburtstag von Hans-Georg Beck" (PDF), propylaeum.de (in German), pp. 1–8, archived from the original (PDF) on 11 December 2010
- Kresten, Otto (2000), "Hans-Georg Beck 18.2.1910 – 25.5.1999" (PDF), Jahrbuch der Bayerischen Akademie der Wissenschaften (in German): 302–309
- Prinzing, Günter (1999), "Hans-Georg Beck (1910–1999)", Südost-Forschungen (in German), 58: 345–350. CEEOL 171922
- Schreiner, Peter (2011), "Hans-Georg Beck und die byzantinische Theologie. Zum hundertsten Geburtstag eines grossen Gelehrten", in Rigo, Antonio (ed.), Byzantine Theology and its Philosophical Background (in German), Turnhout: Brepols, pp. 197–212, doi:10.1484/M.SBHC-EB.1.100968 (Russian translation: "Ханс Георг Бек и византийское богословие (к 100-летию со дня рождения выдающегося учёного)", Vestnik PSGU, 36, 2011, pp. 7–19)
