= Peter Schreiner =

Peter Schreiner may refer to:

- Peter Schreiner (chemist) (born 1965), German chemist
- Peter Schreiner (Byzantinist) (born 1940), German Byzantinist
