= Mairi MacInnes (poet) =

American literary scholar

- Born: 1925; Norton-on-Tees, County Durham, England
- Died: 2017 (aged 91–92); York, England
- Spouse: John O. McCormick (married 1954)
- Children: 3 (two sons and a daughter)

Academic background
- Education: Helmsley and Somerville College, Oxford

Mairi MacInnes (1925–2017) was an English poet. She was granted awards from the National Endowment for the Arts, and an Ingram-Merrill Fellowship. She was educated at Somerville College, Oxford and married to John O. McCormick.

== Books ==
- Splinters (1953)
- Admit One (1956)
- Herring, Oatmeal, Milk & Salt (1982)
- The House on the Ridge Road (1988)
- Elsewhere and Back (1988)
- The Ghostwriter (1999)
- The Girl I Left Behind Me: Poems of a Lifetime (2003)
- Amazing Memories of Childhood, etc (2015)
- The Quondam Wives (1993)
- Clearances (2002)
