= Vera von Falkenhausen =

German Byzantinist (born 1938)

Vera Falkenhausen
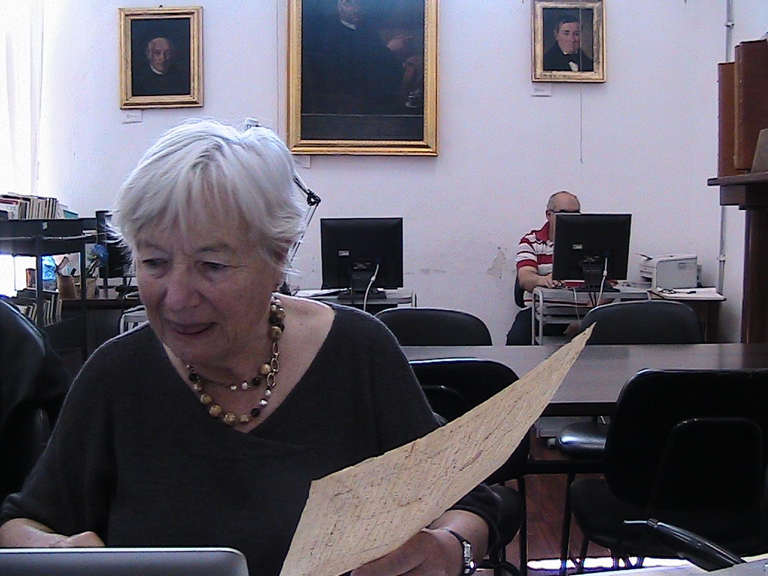
- Falkenhausen in 2013
- Born: 19 February 1938 (age 88); Essen, Germany

Academic background
- Education: LMU Munich
- Doctoral advisor: Hans-Georg Beck

Academic work
- Discipline: Byzantine Studies
- Sub-discipline: Byzantine history; Byzantine literature
- Institutions: University of Pisa; University of Basilicata; Gabriele d'Annunzio University; University of Rome Tor Vergata

Vera von Falkenhausen (born 19 February 1938) is a German Byzantinist who lives and works in Italy.

== Life ==
Vera von Falkenhausen pursued Byzantine studies at LMU Munich, where she wrote her thesis in 1966 under Hans-Georg Beck. She then spent the years from 1968 to 1970 at the Dumbarton Oaks Center for Byzantine Studies in Washington, D.C., on a scholarship. Since 1974, she has been active as a professor of Byzantine history and literature at the University of Pisa, the University of Basilicata in Potenza, Gabriele d'Annunzio University, and finally at the University of Rome Tor Vergata. Since 2007, she is a professor emerita.

Her field of research are the various aspects of Byzantine rule in southern Italy and Sicily. Much of her work has been devoted to the analysis and critical edition of Greek primary sources. Since 2006, she is the editor of the Archivio storico per la Calabria e la Lucania, founded in 1931 by Paolo Orsi and Umberto Zanotti Bianco, on behalf of the Associazione Nazionale per gli Interessi del Mezzogiorno d'Italia. In addition, she is a member of the scientific advisory council of the journal Nea Rhome, founded in 2004.

From 2010 to 2012, she was the chair of the Associazione Italiana di Studi Bizantini.

== Works (selection) ==
- Untersuchungen über die byzantinische Herrschaft in Süditalien vom 9. bis ins 11. Jahrhundert. Wiesbaden 1967 (published thesis).
  - Expanded Italian edition: La dominazione bizantina nell'Italia meridionale dal IX all'XI secolo. Bari 1978.
- I ceti dirigenti prenormanni al tempo della costituzione degli stati normanni nell’Italia meridionale e in Sicilia. in: Forme di potere e struttura sociale in Italia nel Medioevo. Bologna 1977, pp. 321–377.
- Zur Sprache der mittelalterlichen griechischen Urkunden aus Süditalien und Sizilien. in: La cultura in Italia fra Tardo Antico e Alto Medioevo. Atti del Convegno tenuto a Roma (Consiglio Nazionale delle Ricerche, 12–16 November 1979). Vol. II, Rome 1981, pp. 611–618.
- Die Städte im byzantinischen Italien. in Mélanges de l'École française de Rome Moyen Âge 101/2 (1989), pp. 401–464 (online).
- Gregor von Burtscheid und das griechische Mönchtum in Kalabrien. in: Römische Quartalschrift für christliche Altertumskunde und Kirchengeschichte. 93 (1998), pp. 215–250.
- Zur Regentschaft der Gräfin Adelasia del Vasto in Kalabrien und Sizilien (1101–1112). in: Aetos. Studies in honour of Cyril Mango presented to him on April 14, 1998. Stuttgart-Leipzig 1998, pp. 87–115.
- Griechische Beamte in der duana de secretis von Palermo. Eine prosopographische Untersuchung. in: Zwischen Polis, Provinz und Peripherie. Beiträge zur byzantinischen Geschichte und Kultur. Wiesbaden 2005, pp. 381–411.
- The South Italian Sources. in: Byzantines and Crusaders in Non-Greek Sources, 1025–1204. Oxford 2007 (Proceedings of the British Academy, 132), pp. 95–121.
- Straußeneier im mittelalterlichen Kampanien. in: Ot Zargrada do Belogo Morja. Sbornik statej posrednevekovomu iskustsvu v čest E. C. Smirnovoj. Moscow 2007, pp. 581–598.
- Straßen und Verkehr im byzantinischen Süditalien (6. bis 11. Jahrhundert). in: Die Welt der europäischen Straßen von der Antike bis in die frühe Neuzeit. Cologne-Weimar-Vienna 2009, pp. 219–237.
- Sprachengewirr - wer behält das letzte Wort? Sprachliche Vielfalt im sakralen und profanen Kontext. in: A. Wieczorek, B. Schneidmuller, S. Weinfurter: Die Staufer und Italien. Drei Innovationsregionen im mittelalterlichen Europa. I. Essays. Mannheim 2010, pp. 341–347.
- Adalbert von Prag und das griechische Mönchtum in Italien. in: Italien–Mitteldeutschland–Polen. Geschichte und Kultur im europäischen Kontext vom 10. bis zum 18. Jahrhundert. Leipzig 2013 (Schriften zur sächsischen Geschichte und Volkskunde, 42), pp. 39–56.
- Die Juden im byzantinischen Süditalien und Sizilien (6.–11. Jahrhundert). in: Studien zum mittelalterlichen Judentum im byzantinischen Kulturraum: Süditalien und Sizilien, Konstantinopel und Kreta. Arye Maimon-Institut für Geschichte der Juden: Studien und Texte, Trier 2013, pp. 9–36.

== Sources ==
- Ἀμπελοκήπιον. Studi di amici e colleghi in onore di Vera von Falkenhausen. in: Νέα Ῥώμη / Nea Rhome. Rivista di ricerche bizantinistiche, I: 1, 2004 (pp. 7–22: Bibliografìa di Vera von Falkenhausen); II: ibid, 2, 2005; III: ibid, 3, 2006; IV: ibid, 4, 2007, (index online).
