= Francis Russell (author) =

American writer (1910–1989)

Francis Russell (January 12, 1910 – March 20, 1989) was an American author specializing in American history and historical figures, who was born in Boston, Massachusetts and died in Falmouth, Massachusetts. Russell is best known for his book on Warren G. Harding, The Shadow of Blooming Grove. He graduated from Bowdoin College, and from Harvard University, with a master's degree in 1937. He served in the Canadian Army from 1941 to 1946.

He married Rosalind Lawson. He had a daughter from a previous marriage.

His papers are kept at Bowdoin College.

Russell became embroiled in a lawsuit with some of the heirs of Warren Harding around the publication of his 1968 biography of the former president. Alleging that they had been embarrassed by the previous publication of some of the love letters of Harding, the heirs sued and won a judgement preventing the publication of the letters by Russell.

His work on the Sacco-Vanzetti case, the award-winning Tragedy in Dedham: The Story of the Sacco-Vanzetti Case (1962), continued with the 1986 publication of Sacco & Vanzetti: The Case Resolved. In it, he claimed to solve the case, proposing that only Nicola Sacco was guilty and Bartholomew Vanzetti was innocent.

== Awards ==
- 1963 Edgar Award for Best Fact Crime book, for Tragedy In Dedham : The Story of the Sacco-Vanzetti Case
- 1964 Guggenheim Fellowship

== Works ==
- Tragedy In Dedham : The Story of the Sacco-Vanzetti Case, McGraw-Hill, 1962
- Lexington, Concord and Bunker Hill (with the Editors of American Heritage) (1963)
- The Great Interlude (1964)
- The Shadow of Blooming Grove (published in the UK as President Harding: His Life and Times 1866-1923) (1968)
- The Horizon Concise History of Germany (1973)
- Adams: An American Dynasty, American Heritage Pub. Co., 1976, ISBN 9780070543027; reprint Castle Books, 2005, ISBN 978-0-7858-1882-3
- A City in Terror: 1919, the Boston Police Strike, Viking Press, 1975, ISBN 978-0-670-22449-4; reprint, Beacon Press, 2005, ISBN 978-0-8070-5033-0
- The President Makers: From Mark Hanna to Joseph P. Kennedy (1976)
- Sacco & Vanzetti: The Case Resolved (1986)
- The Knave of Boston & Other Ambiguous Massachusetts Characters (1987)
