= Peter Grippe =

American sculptor, printmaker, and painter

- Born: August 11, 1912; Buffalo, New York
- Died: November 18, 2002 (aged 90); Suffolk, New York
- Occupations: sculptor, painter, printmaker, artist

Peter Grippe (August 11, 1912 – October 18, 2002) was an American sculptor, printmaker, and painter. As a sculptor, he worked in bronze, terracotta, wire, plaster, and found objects. His "Monument to Hiroshima" series (1963) used found objects cast in bronze sculptures to evoke the chaotic humanity of the Japanese city after its incineration by atomic bomb. Other Grippe Surrealist sculptural works address less warlike themes, including that of city life. However, his expertise extended beyond sculpture to ink drawings, watercolor painting, and printmaking (intaglio). He joined and later directed Atelier 17, the intaglio studio founded in London and moved to New York at the beginning of World War II by its founder, Stanley William Hayter. Today, Grippe's 21 Etchings and Poems, a part of the permanent collection at the Davis Museum and Cultural Center at Wellesley College in Wellesley, Massachusetts, is available as part of the museum's virtual collection.

== Biography ==
Grippe, a member of the American Abstract Artists group, was born on August 11, 1912, in Buffalo, New York, and died on October 18, 2002, in Suffolk, New York. While primarily known as a sculptor working in bronze and clay, he created a portfolio of etchings by 21 artists (examples include Willem de Kooning, Jacques Lipchitz, and Peter Grippe himself) and 21 poets (including Frank O'Hara, Dylan Thomas, and Thomas Merton) in a work entitled 21 Etchings and Poems. The collective work took three years to print and was published by New York's Morris Gallery in 1960.

Grippe was educated at the Albright-Knox Art School (today the Buffalo Fine Arts Academy) and the Art Institute of Buffalo. He moved to New York in the 1930s, and his work reflects a move into the Cubist and Surrealist schools. According to Bob Mattison, Marshall R. Metzgar Professor of Art History at Lafayette College, Easton, Pennsylvania, “Moving away from simply realist depictions in public monuments, Grippe and his colleagues embraced Cubism with its openwork multidimensional view of the world and Surrealist imagery drawn from the subconscious thus bringing American sculpture into the modern era.” As Grippe's artistic and academic career progressed, he taught at several higher education institutions, including Brandeis University, where he was named the first professor of sculpture. He was awarded a Guggenheim Fellowship in the category of fine arts in 1964.

A transcribed interview with Grippe is available at the Smithsonian Institution's Archives of American Art. The interviewer, Dorothy Seckler, spoke with him in 1968. Grippe is also mentioned in a transcribed Smithsonian Institution interview in 2002 with Ruth Asawa in her San Francisco in which she discusses his technique and their associates during the period from 1946 to 1949.

Seven years after Grippe's death, his widow, Florence, made a gift of his work, his personal collection of art, and his personal papers to the Allentown Art Museum of the Lehigh Valley (Pennsylvania). He had a gallery exhibition in the Susan Teller Gallery of New York in November 2010.

== Exhibitions and awards ==
Peter Grippe’s career was marked by many exhibitions, awards, and other honors, noted in the following partial list listed chronologically with information from exhibition catalogues, primarily a retrospective catalogue published by the Sid Deutsch Gallery for a one-man exhibition in 1991. The catalogues are available to view at Brooklyn Museum of Art Library, Brooklyn, N.Y.

- Orrefors Gallery, New York, N.Y. 1942 (sole exhibition).
- Willard Gallery, New York, 1944, 1945, 1948 (multiple sole exhibitions).
- Whitney Museum of American Art, New York, N.Y., 1945 (group exhibition, “Annual Exhibition of Contemporary Sculpture, Drawings & Watercolours”).
- Clay Club, New York, N.Y., 1946 (group exhibition, “Abstract & Non-Objective Sculpture”).
- Willard Gallery, New York, N.Y. “Peter Grippe Watercolors and Sculpture,” October 8 to November 2, 1946 (sole exhibition).
- Brooklyn Museum, Brooklyn, N.Y., 1947 (prize, “Purchase Prize - First Annual Print Exhibition of Brooklyn Museum”)
- Museum of Modern Art, New York, N.Y., 1951 (group exhibition, “Abstract Painting & Sculpture in America”).
- Metropolitan Museum of Art, New York, N.Y., 1952 (award, “Contemporary Watercolors, Drawings & Prints Award”, $500 print prize).
- Print Club, Philadelphia, Pennsylvania, 1953 (award, “Charles M. Lea Award”)
- Arts Commission of Boston, Boston, Massachusetts, 1955 (award, “Boston Arts Festival Award”, $200 first prize for sculpture).
- National Council for U.S. Art, 1955 (award, $1000 sculpture award).
- Brandeis University, Waltham, Massachusetts, 1957 (designed medallion for Creative Arts Award given by Brandeis University).
- Slosberg Gallery, Brandeis University. Waltham, Massachusetts (in co-operation with the Peridot Gallery, New York City). “Sculpture Drawings Prints by Peter Grippe,” Monday, February 10, 1958 (sole exhibition opening).
- Peridot Gallery. “Peter Grippe.” April 14 to May 11, 1959 (sole exhibition).
- Nordness Gallery, New York, 1960 (sole exhibition).
- Nordness Gallery, New York. May 21 to June 8, 1963 (sole exhibition).
- Guggenheim Fellowship for Sculpture, New York, N.Y. (award, “Guggenheim Fellowship for Sculpture).
- American Academy, Rome, Italy, 1965 (group exhibition).
- Sculptors Guild, New York, N.Y., 1967 (group exhibition).
- Museum of Modern Art, New York, N.Y., 1969 (group exhibition, “The New American Painting & Sculpture: The First Generation”).
- Institute of Contemporary Art, Boston, Massachusetts, 1969 (group exhibition, “Boston Now”).
- Boston Athenaeum, Boston, Massachusetts, 1979 (group exhibition, “American Contemporary Sculpture”).
- Whitney Museum of American Art, 1980 (group exhibition, “The Figurative Tradition”).
- Parrish Museum, Southampton, N.Y., 1985, (group exhibition, “Painting & Sculpture in New York, 1936-1946”).
- Sid Deutsch Gallery, New York, N.Y.. “Peter Grippe - Selections from the 30s and 40s: Sculpture, Paintings & Drawings.” October 5–30, 1991 (sole exhibition).
- Allentown Art Museum, “Peter Grippe [...].” [start date] to [close date], 2010 (sole exhibition; also includes “21 Etchings and Poems” portfolio). Posthumous retrospective exhibition after Florence Grippe’s gift of the artist’s personal collection and papers to the Allentown Art Museum in 2009.

== Public commissions ==
- Brandeis University, Waltham, Massachusetts. Theodore Shapiro Forum, sculpture, 1963.
- Brandeis University, Waltham, Massachusetts. Portrait of composer Irving Fine, 1964.
- Simmons College, Boston. Sculpture for Science Building lobby, 1969.
- Brandeis University, Waltham, Massachusetts. Portrait of Marver H. Bernstein, university president, 1980.

== Locations of permanent collections ==
- Addison Gallery of American Art, Andover, Massachusetts
- Albright-Knox Art Gallery, Buffalo, N.Y.
- Allentown Art Museum of the Lehigh Valley, Allentown, Pennsylvania
- Blanden Memorial Gallery, Fort Dodge, Iowa
- Brandeis University, Waltham, Massachusetts
- Brooklyn Museum, Brooklyn, N.Y.
- Hirshhorn Museum and Sculpture Garden, Washington, D.C.
- Library of Congress, Washington, D.C.
- Museum of Modern Art, New York, N.Y.
- National Gallery of Art (Rosenwald Collection), Washington, D.C.
- New York Public Library (print collection), New York, N.Y.
- Newark Museum, Newark, N.J.
- Philadelphia Museum of Art, Philadelphia, Pennsylvania
