= George T. Dennis =

American Jesuit and Byzantinist (1923–2010)

- Born: November 17, 1923; Somerville, Massachusetts, United States of America
- Died: March 7, 2010 (aged 86); Los Gatos, California, United States of America
- Occupations: Jesuit; University professor

Academic background
- Education: Gonzaga University; Jesuit School of Theology, Santa Clara; Pontifical Oriental Institute
- Thesis: The Reign of Manuel II Palaeologus in Thessalonica, 1382–1387
- Doctoral advisor: Raymond-Joseph Loenertz
- Other advisors: Franz Dölger; Joseph Gill SJ

Academic work
- Discipline: Byzantine studies
- Sub-discipline: Byzantine history
- Institutions: Loyola University; Catholic University of America

George Thomas Dennis SJ (17 November 1923 – 7 March 2010) was an American Byzantinist, Jesuit and university professor, emeritus professor of history at the Catholic University of America.

== Biography ==
Born in Somerville, Massachusetts, on 17 November 1923, Dennis relocated to Santa Monica, California, as a teenager, where he graduated from the local high school and entered the Sacred Heart Novitiate in Los Gatos (1941). He studied the classics and history at the Santa Clara University, received a B.A. from Gonzaga University in Spokane (1947), and the Licentiate in Theology from the Jesuit School of Theology (then Alma College) in Los Gatos-Santa Clara (1955). He had previously spent three years teaching Latin and Greek at St. Ignatius High School in San Francisco, and had been ordained to priesthood in 1954.

In 1956, he moved to Italy, where he spent his tertianship in Florence and studied under Joseph Gill SJ and Raymond-Joseph Loenertz OP at the Pontifical Oriental Institute, also spending a semester and Munich where he was taught by Franz Dölger. With Loenertz, Dennis prepared and defended a dissertation on the five-year reign of Manuel II Palaiologos in Thessaloniki (1382–1387).

From 1961 to 1966, Dennis taught medieval history at the Loyola University in Los Angeles, and obtained a Guggenheim Fellowship which allowed him a leave to spend 1964–65 studying Greek manuscripts at the Bibliothèque Nationale de France. In 1966, he moved to the Catholic University of America, where he was to spend the rest of his career. In 1986–87, he served as visiting professor at the Pontifical Oriental Institute. In 1990–91, he obtained a Dumbarton Oaks Fellowship and served as Senior Fellow at the college from 1995 to 2001. Due to declining health conditions, in 2001 he retired from Catholic University of America and returned to Loyola University as adjunct professor of history, definitely retiring in 2005.

Dennis was involved in charity throughout his whole life. Before moving to Rome, he spent some time at the orphanage of an US Army base in Casablanca, Morocco; in Washington, he devoted much of his spare time to the local disadvantaged teenagers, playing American football with them and helping organise job fairs and summer rock concerts, and regularly celebrated the Sunday Mass at a local retirement home. As early as 1971, he criticised his own Catholic University's disinterest in off-campus charity and detachment from the community:

The Speech and Drama Department represents about all that the rest of the city knows about CU. The University plays little or no role in the development of the community, yet it has facilities, leadership potential, and a great deal more to offer. ‘Neutrality’ is only the position of some administrators and, as is fairly obvious, does not represent the feeling of the University’s faculty or students. If the University does not loudly let its real stand on vital issues be known, it might as well relocate to some remote spot on the planet.

— George T. Dennis (1971)

His off-campus involvement in charity included serving as Head of the Neighborhood Planning Council for Northwestern Washington and protesting the 1971 curfew imposed by the local administration with an article on the local newspaper "The Tower".

In theological matters, in 1968 Dennis criticised Pope Paul VI's encyclical Humanae Vitae together with Charles Curran, at the time also of the Catholic University of America, and in 1984 he criticised the engagement by some bishops against abortion and the increasing politicization of the Catholic Church. In 1992, he protested against the founding of a library that would become the Saint John Paul II National Shrine.

Dennis suffered from a much challenged health in his final decade. A stroke in 2000 lost him the ability to move his right hand and confined him on a wheelchair. In 2005, due to declining health conditions, Dennis moved to a Jesuit retirement home in Los Gatos, where he died in 2010. His private library was donated to the Ukrainian Catholic University in Lviv.

== Research activity ==
Dennis began his scholarly activity when still in seminary, discovering an autograph of Philipp Melanchthon in the rare books collection of the Gonzaga University. He was primarily interested in Byzantine military history and contributed four volumes to the Corpus Fontium Historiae Byzantinae, three of which concerned with Byzantine military treatises. Other lines of research of his were Manuel II Palaiologos and his reign, with the edition and translation of the emperor's surviving letter collection and the first edition of documents issued by him; and Byzantine rhetoric, contributing to the Teubner Psellos directed by Leendert Westerink with the critical edition of the panegyrics and the forensic speeches. In 1967, he published the complete text of the Byzantine-Turkish treaty of Gallipoli (1403).

A collection of Kleine Schriften, mostly concerned with late Byzantine history and including the unpublished critical edition of the letters of Byzantine diplomat Theodoros Potamios (late XIV century), was published in 1982 by Variorum reprints.

A Festschrift in his honour was edited in 1995.

== Works (selection) ==
The complete bibliography up to 1995 was published in the Festschrift in his honour.

- Dennis, G. T. (1955). "An Unnoticed Autograph of Philip Melanchthon and of Paul Eber". Medievalia et Humanistica. 9: 100–103.
- Dennis, G. T. (1960). The Reign of Manuel II Palaeologus in Thessalonica (1382–1387). Orientalia Christiana Analecta, 159. Rome: Pontifical Oriental Institute.
- Dennis, G. T. (1965). "Un fondo sconosciuto di atti notarili veneti in San Francisco". Studi Veneziani. 7: 424–432.
- Dennis, G. T. (1967). "The Byzantine-Turkish Treaty of 1403". Orientalia Christiana Periodica. 33: 72–88.
- Dennis, G. T. (1968). "Two Unknown Documents of Manuel II Palaeologus". Travaux & Mémoires. 3: 397–404.
- Dennis, G. T. (1971). "Official Documents of Manuel II Palaeologus". Byzantion. 41: 45–58. JSTOR 44170305.
- Dennis, G. T., ed. (1977). The Letters of Manuel II Palaeologus. Corpus Fontium Historiae Byzantinae, 8. Washington, D. C.: Dumbarton Oaks.
- Dennis, G. T., ed. (1981). Das Strategikon des Maurikios. Corpus Fontium Historiae Byzantinae, 17 (in German). Translated by Gamillscheg, E. Vienna: Österreichischen Akademie der Wissenschaften.
- Dennis, G. T. (1982). Byzantium and the Franks, 1350–1420. Collected Studies, 150. London: Variorum Reprints. — Kleine Schriften.
- Dennis, G. T., ed. (1984). Maurice's Strategicon: A Handbook of Byzantine Military Strategy. Philadelphia: University of Pennsylvania Press.
- Dennis, G. T., ed. (1985). Three Byzantine Military Treatises. Corpus Fontium Historiae Byzantinae, 25. Washington, D. C.: Dumbarton Oaks.
- Dennis, G. T., ed. (1994a). Michaelis Pselli Orationes forenses et acta. Bibliotheca Teubneriana. Leipzig: B. G. Teubner.
- Dennis, G. T., ed. (1994b). Michaelis Pselli Orationes panegyricae. Bibliotheca Teubneriana. Leipzig: B. G. Teubner.
- Dennis, G. T., ed. (2010). The Taktika of Leo VI. Corpus Fontium Historiae Byzantinae, 49. Washington, D. C.: Dumbarton Oaks.

== Trivia ==
- Despite a Jesuit for nearly seven decades, he rarely wore the clerical collar and preferred layman casual clothes, with particular preference for blue jeans and plaid shirts, which he claimed put his university students at ease and allowed him to be entrusted more easily by the disadvantaged teenagers he helped in Washington (to whom he simply introduced himself as "George", never mentioning his scholarly background).

== Bibliography ==
- Johnson, D. W. (2010). "George T. Dennis, S.J. (1923–2010)". The Catholic Historical Review. 96 (4): 883–884. JSTOR 25741057.
- Klimó, Á. von (11 August 2020). "The Archivist's Nook: Father George T. Dennis: Scholar and Engaged Priest". lib.cua.edu.
- Miller, T. S.; Nesbitt, J., eds. (1995). Peace and War in Byzantium. Essays in Honor of George T. Dennis, S.J. Washington, D.C.: The Catholic University of America Press.
- Talbot, A.-M. (2011–2012). "George T. Dennis, S.J. (1923–2010)". Dumbarton Oaks Papers. 65/66: 1–4. JSTOR 41933701.
