= John O. McCormick =

American literary scholar

- Born: September 20, 1918; Thief River Falls, Minnesota
- Died: April 1, 2010 (aged 91); York, England
- Spouse(s): Helen Manuel (divorced); Mairi MacInnes (married 1954)
- Awards: Guggenheim Fellowship

Academic background
- Education: Harvard University (PhD), University of Minnesota

John Owen McCormick (September 20, 1918 - April 1, 2010) was an American literary scholar and Distinguished Professor of Comparative Literature at Rutgers University where he taught for 28 years. On his retirement McCormick was appointed honorary Professor Emeritus by the University of York. He was a 1988 finalist of Pulitzer Prize for Biography for his book George Santayana: A Biography.

== Books ==
- George Santayana: A Biography (1987)
- Catastrophe & Imagination (1957)
- The Middle Distance: A Comparative History of American and European Literature, 1919-32 (1971)
- Fiction and Knowledge (1975)
- Seagoing (2000)
