= Chieh-Su Hsu =

Chinese-born American engineer

- Born: 1922; China
- Died: July 2014 (aged 91–92)
- Occupation: Engineer
- Spouse: Helen Tse

Academic background
- Education: Ministry of Military Administration Ordnance School (aka Chongqing Ordnance School ,now Chung Cheng Institute of Technology, NDU); Stanford University

Academic work
- Discipline: Engineering
- Institutions: University of California, Berkeley

Chieh-Su Hsu (Chinese: 徐皆蘇; pinyin: Xú Jiēsū; 27 May 1922 – 22 July 2014) was a Chinese-born American engineer.

== Early life and education ==
Hsu was born in Beijing on 27 May 1922, as one of six siblings, including four brothers. The family moved to Suzhou, where they remained until the outbreak of the Second Sino-Japanese War. In 1937, Hsu and his older brother moved to Chongqing, and Hsu enrolled at the Chongqing Ordnance School (now Chung Cheng Institute of Technology, NDU).

He left China for Stanford University in the United States after becoming one of sixty students to win a nationwide contest for a scholarship. Hsu completed a master's degree in 1948, and a doctorate advised by James N. Goodier in 1950.

== Career ==
Upon graduating in 1945, Hsu served one year in the National Revolutionary Army, then worked at Shanghai Naval Dockyard and Engineering Works from 1946 to 1947. From 1951 to 1958, Hsu was an engineer at IBM.

Hsu began teaching at the University of Toledo in 1955, leaving for the University of California, Berkeley in 1958. In 1964, he was named full professor at Berkeley, and awarded a Guggenheim Fellowship. He was elected a fellow of the American Society of Mechanical Engineers in 1977. Subsequently, Hsu was elected a member of the United States National Academy of Engineering in 1988, "[f]or the development of innovative techniques, especially cell-to-cell mapping, and for the analysis of the dynamics of nonlinear systems." A year before his retirement in 1991, Hsu was elected a member of Academia Sinica.

== Personal life ==
Hsu was married to Helen Tse from 1953 until his death. He suffered a heart attack on 6 June 2014, and died of its complications in Cupertino, California, on 25 July 2014, aged 92.( or 22 July 2014)
