= Variorum Collected Studies =

Variorum Collected Studies is an academic book series in the humanities published by Ashgate Publishing. The aim of each volume is to bring together, for the first time, a selection of articles by a leading scholar on their particular area of expertise. This allows easy access to material that may be hard to find separately because it is out of print or available only in specialist libraries. It also allows the reader to see the development of a scholar's thinking on a topic over time. There are over 1000 volumes in the series.

== History ==
The series is published by Ashgate and since it was established in 1970, over 1000 volumes have been produced.

== Purpose and structure ==
The purpose of each volume is to bring together, for the first time, a selection of articles by a leading scholar on their particular area of expertise together with an index and, sometimes, new material. Each article retains its original page numbers with a separate pagination added for the book as a whole.

The contents of each collection are drawn from academic journal articles, conference proceedings, Festschrifts, and similar sources that may otherwise be difficult to access because they were printed in obscure journals, are out of print, or available only in specialist libraries. Each volume also allows the development of a scholar's ideas on a particular topic to be seen over time. Articles are reprinted in facsimile, i.e. photocopied from the volume they were originally published in. As a consequence, volumes in the "Collected Studies" series have no fixed nor regular page numbering, and allow materials to be referenced to exactly as if the reader had the original publication in hands. Occasionally, volumes may include original works, as in the case of George T. Dennis' Byzantium and the Franks (1982, CS 150).

In his review of Roger Scott's Byzantine Chronicles and the Sixth Century (2012, CS 1004), for instance, Conor Whately in the Bryn Mawr Classical Review noted that some of the articles included in the volume were over 40 years old, two were new, and some came "from hard to find publications such as Bysantinska Sälskapet Bulletin, a boon for scholars who might otherwise lack access to them".

John Dillon, reviewing a different volume in the series, also for the Bryn Mawr Classical Review, noted that the 13 articles in the volume by Richard Sorabji ranged from the 1970s up to the 2010s. They thus had the merit of allowing "a most intriguing conspectus of the development of Sorabji’s thought on a number of topics that have long been of interest to him."

== Associated series ==
There are a number of associated and complementary series such as, The Formation of the Classical Islamic World, The Worlds of Eastern Christianity, 300-1500, The Expansion of Latin Europe, 1000-1500, and publications for the Society for the Promotion of Byzantine Studies.

== See also ==
- Monographic series
