= Edith K. MacRae =

American biologist (1919–1995)

- Born: January 24, 1919; Waterbury, Connecticut, U.S.
- Died: October 7, 1995 (aged 76); Chapel Hill, North Carolina, U.S.
- Occupations: Anatomist; zoologist
- Spouse: Duncan MacRae Jr. (m. 1950)
- Children: 1
- Relatives: James C. MacRae (grandfather-in-law)
- Awards: Guggenheim Fellowship (1964)

Academic background
- Education: Bates College (BS); Columbia University (MS and PhD)
- Thesis: Distribution and properties of intracellular alkaline phosphatases (1946)

Academic work
- Discipline: Anatomy; zoology
- Institutions: University of Illinois Urbana-Champaign; University of North Carolina at Chapel Hill

Edith Jane Krugelis MacRae (January 24, 1919 – October 7, 1995) was an American anatomist and zoologist. Originally working at Vassar College, the Carlsberg Laboratory, Yale University, the Massachusetts Institute of Technology, and the University of California, Berkeley, she received a 1964 Guggenheim Fellowship to study Turbellaria physiology. MacRae worked as a professor at the University of Illinois Urbana-Champaign and the University of North Carolina at Chapel Hill, and with her husband Duncan MacRae Jr. endowed the Duncan MacRae and Rebecca Kyle MacRae Professorship of Public Policy Analysis.

== Biography ==
Edith Jane Krugelis was born on January 24, 1919, in Waterbury, Connecticut, daughter of Ezabel Natkevicius and Peter Charles Krugelis. She obtained a BS in biology and chemistry from Bates College in 1940. She later attended Columbia University, where she obtained a MS in zoology in 1941 and a PhD in zoology in 1946; her doctoral dissertation was Distribution and properties of intracellular alkaline phosphatases. She was a 1947-1948 Donner Foundation fellow and a 1948-1949 American Cancer Society fellow.

MacRae was a zoology instructor at Vassar College (1945–1947), as well as a fellow at the Carlsberg Laboratory (1947–1949). After joining Yale University as an instructor and research associate in zoology in 1949, she became a biology instructor at the Massachusetts Institute of Technology in 1951, becoming that university's first woman biology faculty member. She remained at MIT until 1953, when she joined University of California, Berkeley as a research zoologist, serving until 1956.

In 1957, MacRae joined the University of Illinois Urbana-Champaign as an assistant professor of anatomy, and was promoted to associate professor in 1963; she was part of their College of Medicine. In 1972, she moved to the University of North Carolina at Chapel Hill, remaining in the faculty until her retirement in 1989; she was named professor emerita of cell biology and anatomy at the UNC School of Medicine. She promoted minority representation in the healthcare sector as part of UNC's Medical Education Development program.

As a researcher, MacRae studied cell biochemistry, the circulatory system, and invertebrate biology. In 1964, she was appointed a Guggenheim Fellow "for a study of photoreceptor systems in Turbellarians in terms of fine structure and possible mechanism". She also received several teaching awards at UI and UNC.

MacRae married political scientist Duncan MacRae Jr. (grandson of James C. MacRae) in 1950; they had one daughter and were married until her death. In 1989, she and her husband endowed the Duncan MacRae and Rebecca Kyle MacRae Professorship of Public Policy Analysis, named after her parents-in-law. She was part of the Phi Beta Kappa and Sigma Xi honor societies.

Following her retirement, MacRae joined the Chapel Hill Golden Kiwanis Club. At the time of her death, she was living in the Gimghoul Neighborhood Historic District in Chapel Hill.

MacRae died on October 7, 1995, aged 76, in North Carolina Memorial Hospital in Chapel Hill.
