= Chung Cheng Institute of Technology =

Military institute in Daxi, Taoyuan, Taiwan

Chung Cheng Institute of Technology, NDU
- 國防大學理工學院 (中正理工學院)
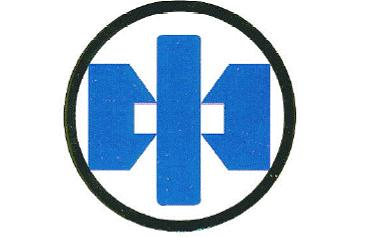
- Emblem of the Chung Cheng Institute of Technology
- Former names: Hanyang Ordnance School (1917); National Government Ordnance School (1926); Ministry of Military Administration Ordnance School (1933); Ordnance Engineering College (1946); Army Institute of Technology (1962); Chung Cheng Institute of Technology (1966)
- Type: Military institute of technology
- Established: 1917 (as predecessor institution); 1966 (as Chung Cheng Institute of Technology)
- Parent institution: National Defense University
- Affiliations: Republic of China Armed Forces
- Location: Daxi District, Taoyuan City, Taiwan; 24°53′N 121°17′E
- Campus: 67 hectares
- Language: Taiwanese Mandarin
- Nickname: CCIT, NDU
- Website: www.ccit.ndu.edu.tw

The Chung Cheng Institute of Technology (CCIT; Chinese: 中正理工學院; pinyin: Zhōngzhèng Lǐgōng Xuéyuàn) was a military institute of technology located in Daxi District, Taoyuan City, Taiwan. It served as the primary institution in the Republic of China for training officers specialising in science and technology for national defense. In 2000, it was merged into the newly established National Defense University (NDU).

== History ==
=== Predecessor institutions and name chronology ===
The following table summarises the full succession of institutional names that led to the founding of the Chung Cheng Institute of Technology:

Year	Chinese Name	English Name	Notes
1903	京師陸軍測繪學堂	Beijing Army Surveying and Mapping School	Founded in Peking as a surveying and mapping school; predecessor of the Surveying lineage
1911	中央陸地測量學校	Central Army Survey School	Renamed after the founding of the Republic of China
1917	漢陽兵工專門學校	Hanyang Ordnance School	Founded at the Hanyang Arsenal by order of Premier Duan Qirui; predecessor of the main engineering lineage
1922	—	—	Temporarily suspended due to lack of funding
1924	漢陽兵工專門學校	Hanyang Ordnance School	Re-established; curriculum extended to four years
1926	國民政府兵工專門學校	National Government Ordnance School	Renamed following the Northern Expedition
1933	軍政部兵工專門學校	Ministry of Military Administration Ordnance School	Relocated to Nanjing; reorganised under the Ministry of Military Administration
1945	中央測量學校	Central Survey School	Renamed (surveying lineage); renamed again after relocation to Taiwan as 聯勤測量學校
1946	兵工工程學院	Ordnance Engineering College	Upgraded to college-level institution
1962	陸軍理工學院	Army Institute of Technology	Separated from the Ordnance School in September 1962; placed under the Army General Headquarters; campus on Xinsheng South Road, Taipei
1966	中正理工學院	Chung Cheng Institute of Technology	Renamed in October 1966; placed directly under the Ministry of National Defense; new campus site selected in Daxi
1968	中正理工學院	Chung Cheng Institute of Technology	Campus relocated to Yuanshulin, Daxi, Taoyuan County in December 1968
1969	中正理工學院	Chung Cheng Institute of Technology	Absorbed the Naval Engineering College (海軍工程學院) and the Joint Logistics Surveying School (聯勤測量學校) in March 1969
2000	國防大學中正理工學院	Chung Cheng Institute of Technology, National Defense University	Merged into National Defense University on 8 May 2000
2006	國防大學理工學院	Chung Cheng Institute of Technology, National Defense University	Renamed again on 1 September 2006 under the Northern Region Military Schools Consolidation Plan

=== Engineering lineage: Origins (1917–1949) ===
The main engineering lineage of the institute traces its origins to 1917, when Premier Duan Qirui of the Beiyang government established the Hanyang Ordnance School (漢陽兵工專門學校) at the famous Hanyang Arsenal in Hankou (modern-day Wuhan), Hubei Province. The school was founded to train engineering talent for the defence industry, initially recruiting primary and junior high school graduates for half-day study and half-day factory internships. After three intakes, the school was temporarily suspended in 1922 due to budget shortfalls.

In 1924, the school was re-established and upgraded, modelling itself on Japanese imperial universities with four-year programmes in armaments manufacturing and chemical engineering, recruiting senior high school graduates. In 1926, following the Northern Expedition, it was renamed the National Government Ordnance School (國民政府兵工專門學校). In 1933, with the establishment of the Ministry of Military Administration, it was reorganised as the Ministry of Military Administration Ordnance School (軍政部兵工專門學校) and relocated to Nanjing. Following the end of World War II in 1945, the institution was further upgraded in 1946 to become the Ordnance Engineering College (兵工工程學院), offering a full university-level programme.

=== Surveying lineage: Origins (1903–1949) ===
The surveying lineage of the institute dates back to 1903 (the 8th year before the founding of the Republic of China), when the Beijing Army Surveying and Mapping School (京師陸軍測繪學堂) was established in Peking. After the founding of the Republic of China in 1911, it was renamed the Central Army Survey School (中央陸地測量學校). The school relocated multiple times during the Northern Expedition and the Second Sino-Japanese War, and was renamed the Central Survey School (中央測量學校) on 1 March 1945. After relocating to Taiwan following the Chinese Civil War, it was renamed the Joint Logistics Surveying School (聯勤測量學校).

=== Restructuring in Taiwan (1949–1966) ===
Following the Chinese Civil War, the Ordnance Engineering College relocated to Hualien, Taiwan with the Government of the Republic of China in 1949. The school have suffered severe damage in the 1951 Hualien earthquake, so it was ordered to build a new school building on Xinsheng South Road in Taipei City. In the autumn of 1952, all the students have moved in. In September 1962, the institution was separated from the Ordnance School (兵工學校), with the college department reorganised as the Army Institute of Technology (陸軍理工學院), placed directly under the Army General Headquarters. Its campus was situated on Xinsheng South Road in Taipei, adjacent to National Taiwan University. During this period the institution expanded its departments to include civil engineering, industrial engineering, and physics, in addition to its original four engineering disciplines.

In October 1966, by order of the Ministry of National Defense, the Army Institute of Technology was renamed the Chung Cheng Institute of Technology (中正理工學院), in honour of Chiang Kai-shek, whose courtesy name (字) was Zhōngzhèng (中正). A new campus site was selected along the Dahan River at Zhongzhengling in Daxi, Taoyuan County. In the same year, the Aerospace Engineering Department was established.

=== Consolidation at Daxi (1968–2000) ===
In December 1968, the institute formally relocated to its permanent campus at Yuanshulin (員樹林), Daxi, Taoyuan County. In March 1969, by government order, the institute absorbed both the Naval Engineering College (海軍工程學院) and the Joint Logistics Surveying School (聯勤測量學校), bringing together the engineering, naval, and surveying lineages into a single consolidated institution. New departments in applied mathematics, surveying, and mapping were established at this time.

The consolidated institute became the highest-level institution in the Republic of China dedicated to training defence science and technology personnel under the Ministry of National Defense. It offered undergraduate, master's, and doctoral programmes across thirteen departments.

Admission to the institute was extremely competitive. Of approximately 7,000 applicants annually, only around 300 students were admitted each year. All students received full scholarships covering tuition, room and board, uniforms, and school supplies, along with a monthly allowance. In return, students lived under strict military discipline, including three months of basic military training before the start of the academic year.

=== Merger into National Defense University (2000) ===
On 8 May 2000, as part of a broader restructuring of military higher education in Taiwan, the Chung Cheng Institute of Technology was merged with the Armed Forces University (三軍大學), the National Defense Management College (國防管理學院), and the National Defense Medical Center (國防醫學院) to form the National Defense University (NDU). Within NDU, the former CCIT continued as the Chung Cheng Institute of Technology, National Defense University (國防大學中正理工學院).

On 1 September 2006, under the Ministry of National Defense's Northern Region Military Schools Consolidation Plan, the institute was further renamed the Chung Cheng Institute of Technology, National Defense University (國防大學理工學院), with its campus designated the Zhongzhengling Campus (中正嶺校區). At this point, the name "Chung Cheng Institute of Technology," in use since 1966, formally passed into history.

== Campus ==
The campus of the Chung Cheng Institute of Technology is situated in Daxi District, Taoyuan City, approximately 40 kilometres south-west of Taipei. Covering approximately 67 hectares, the campus includes academic buildings, research laboratories, dormitories, athletic facilities (including a swimming pool), and an observatory. The location in Daxi was chosen partly due to its relatively secluded setting, suitable for a military institution.

== Academic programmes ==
During its independent operation (1968–2000), CCIT offered both undergraduate and graduate programmes across multiple departments aligned with national defence technology needs:

- Mechanical Engineering (兵器工程)
- Electrical Engineering (電機工程)
- Navigation and Aerospace Engineering (航海/航空工程)
- Surveying Engineering (測量工程)
- Naval Architecture and Marine Engineering (造船工程)
- Computer Science and Information Engineering
- Nuclear Engineering

Students received a rigorous technical education integrated with military training. Faculty included both civilian academics and military officers.

== Student life ==
Life at CCIT was governed by strict military discipline. All students resided on campus in dormitories and followed a tightly regulated schedule. Personal conduct, dress code, and dormitory standards were maintained in accordance with military regulations. Despite the demanding environment, extensive athletic facilities and recreational areas were provided to support student wellbeing.

== Notable aspects ==
- The institute was one of the most selective institutions of higher education in Taiwan during the latter half of the 20th century.
- Its graduates occupied key technical and leadership roles within the Republic of China Armed Forces and Taiwan's defence industry.
- CCIT hosted the Five Chung Schools Games (五校運動會), an inter-military-academy athletic competition involving the five major ROC military schools.
- The Chung Cheng Aviation Museum (中正航空科學館) in Taoyuan City is associated with the institute's aviation heritage.

== See also ==
- National Defense University (Republic of China)
- Republic of China Armed Forces
- Ministry of National Defense (Republic of China)
- National Defense Medical Center
