= Giannino Ferrari dalle Spade =

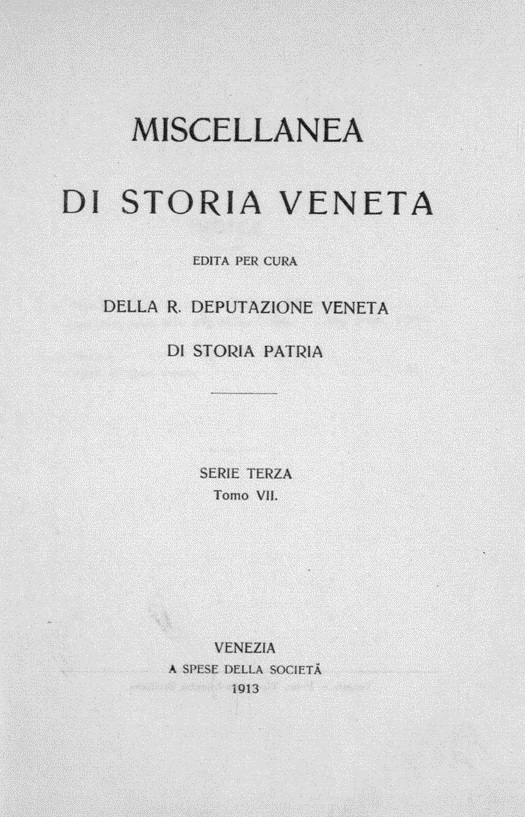
Ordinamento giudiziario a Padova negli ultimi secoli della Repubblica veneta, 1913

Giannino Ferrari Dalle Spade (9 November 1885 – 8 November 1943) was an Italian jurist.

== Life ==
Ferrari Dalle Spade was born in Tregnago, province of Verona. He graduated at the University of Padua, where he was a student of Nino Tamassia. He worked at the University of Ferrara as a scholar from 1908 working on the legislation of the Republic of Venice, Early Middle Ages, and Byzantine Empire. His theories opposed Francesco Schupfer findings. He died in his hometown in 1943.

== Works ==
- Ferrari Dalle Spade, Giannino (1913). Ordinamento giudiziario a Padova negli ultimi secoli della Repubblica veneta (in Italian).
