= Maria Eneyda Pacheco Kauffman Fidalgo =

Brazilian mycologist (1928–1970)

- Born: 21 October 1928; Rio de Janeiro, Brazil
- Died: 1970 (aged 41–42)
- Occupation: Mycologist
- Spouse: Oswaldo Fidalgo
- Awards: Guggenheim Fellowship (1964 and 1966)

Academic background
- Education: Federal University of Rio de Janeiro

Academic work
- Discipline: Mycology
- Institutions: Rio de Janeiro Botanical Garden; Instituto de Botânica

Maria Eneyda Pacheco Kauffman Fidalgo (21 October 1928 – 1970) was a Brazilian mycologist. A Guggenheim Fellow, she worked at the Rio de Janeiro Botanical Garden and Instituto de Botânica.

== Biography ==
She was born on 21 October 1928 in Rio de Janeiro. She studied at the Federal University of Rio de Janeiro, where she obtained her diploma in pharmacology and chemistry degree in 1950 and later her master of science degree. In 1952, she married Oswaldo Fidalgo, with whom she had three daughters.

After working at the Laboratórios Silva Araújo-Roussel as a technical assistant (1951–1952), she became a naturalist at the Rio de Janeiro Botanical Garden's applied botany section, with her application essay being on Lonchocarpus discolor.

Despite her work as a naturalist, she decided to study mycology due to low resources for studying botany. She and her husband accepted Alcides Ribeiro Teixeira's invitation to work at the Instituto de Botânica in São Paulo, and in 1959 she began working there in the cryptogamic section. In 1961, she served as acting head biologist for the institute's morphology and anatomy section. She and her husband described the genus Pseudofistulina and its species Fistulina brasiliensis in a 1963 article of Mycologia.

In 1964, she was awarded a Guggenheim Fellowship "for comparative studies of Asiatic and American tropical fungi". She was awarded a second fellowship in 1966. In 1969, Boris Skvortsov named the flagellate genus Eneidamonas after her. She and her husband published O Dicionário Micológico (1967), for which they won the 1968 Academia Brasileira de Letras' João Ribeiro Award.

In 1970, she was killed in an automobile accident. The herbarium at Instituto de Botânica is called the Maria Eneyda Pacheco Kauffman Fidalgo Herbarium. The Brazilian Society of Mycology began awarding the Maria Eneyda Pacheco Kauffman Fidalgo Award in 2019.
