= Latino urbanism =

American field of study

Latino urbanism is a field of study that examines urban planning and urbanism from the perspective of Latino studies. It aims to highlight the contributions of Latinos to the making of American cities, and the theoretical interventions that Latino studies scholarship has generated in response to urban scholars' lack of engagement with Latino populations. Scholars have attributed this lack of attention to disciplinary boundaries between urban studies and ethnic studies. Latino urbanism as a field is inherently interdisciplinary and includes scholars working in literature, history, anthropology, urban planning, American studies, and more. A key characteristic is its attention to the ways communities act on the built environment, and how they in turn develop "barrio urbanisms," or new knowledges and interventions about the use and organization of urban space. The work of urban planner James Rojas provides an example of the field's attention to Latinos as actors, agents of change and innovators. His art making workshops harness communities' vernacular knowledges to develop urban planning solutions. Some scholars champion the Chicano practice of Rasquachismo—to suggest “placekeeping” as an inventive, make do, popular strategy that can help advance racial justice goals by expanding definitions of urbanism. This scholarship views grassroots interventions into space as strategic and resourceful.

== See also ==
- Urban vitality
