= Harold Toliver =

American literary critic

Harold Earl Toliver
- Born: February 16, 1932 (age 94)
- Education: BA University of Oregon, MA Johns Hopkins University and PhD University of Washington
- Occupation: Literary critic
- Spouse: Mary (Bennette) Toliver
- Children: 2 children
- Awards: Guggenheim fellowships, 1964, 1976.

Harold "Hal" Earl Toliver is an American literary critic, theorist and writer. Currently, he is professor emeritus at the University of California, Irvine. His research interests are in the areas of Renaissance and seventeenth-century literature, English and Comparative Literature, Literary Theory & Criticism. He received Guggenheim awards (1964, 1976) and the Distinguished Research Award (1982). Toliver is married and has two children.

== Biography ==
Harold Earl Toliver was born on February 16, 1932, in McMinnville, Oregon, United States. He is the son of a Yamhill County farmers Marion E. Toliver and Mable A. (Mallery) Toliver. He served in the United States Army, Private first class, 1954–1956. Toliver graduated from University of Oregon, (Bachelor of Arts, 1954) and Johns Hopkins University (Master of Arts, 1958). He earned his doctorate at the University of Washington in 1961. From 1961 to 1964, Toliver taught at Ohio State University. He was a professor of English at UCLA (1965–1966), and then a Professor of English and Comparative Literature at the University of California, Irvine, where he taught for thirty years.

Harold Toliver was an active participant in the well-known School of Criticism and Theory which was founded by a group of leading scholars and critical theorists in 1976. He worked together with such outstanding scholars as Murray Krieger, J. Hillis Miller and Geoffrey Wolff.

During his career, Toliver wrote and edited several books, while also making numerous contributions to scholarly journals. He has, until recently, published mainly literary criticism and history. His books include Transported Styles in Shakespeare and Milton, The Past That Poets Make, and Lyric Provinces in the English Renaissance.

In his more recent publications Toliver has expanded into applications of modern science to the history of ideas to critique the more prominent and durable misconceptions of world history. Since retiring, he has been writing fiction—mainly mysteries under the name of Hal Toliver with Mary Toliver. Titles include Leave Not a Trace (Publish America), Bitterroot (Pentland Press), Done in Blood-Red Ochre (Pentland Press) and Pageant of the Mortals.

Harold Toliver lives in Laguna Beach, California, with his wife Mary (Bennette) Toliver. His other interests include cycling and tennis.

== Publications ==
=== Journal articles ===
- The Dance Under the Greenwood Tree: Hardy's Bucolics. Journal Article. Nineteenth-Century Fiction. University of California Press, Vol. 17, No. 1, June, 1962, pp. 57–68
- The Strategy of Marvell's Resolve against Created Pleasure. Journal Article. SEL: Studies in English Literature 1500–1900, Vol. 4, No. 1, Winter, 1964, pp. 57–69
- Falstaff, the Prince, and the History Play. Journal Article. Shakespeare Quarterly, Vol. 16, No. 1 (Winter, 1965), pp. 63–80
- Herrick's Book of Realms and Moments. Journal Article. ELH Vol. 49, No. 2 (Summer, 1982), pp. 429–448. The Johns Hopkins University Press.
- Workable Fictions in the Henry IV Plays. University of Toronto Quarterly. Volume 53 Issue 1, September 1983, pp. 53–72. Published Online: March 5, 2013.
- Herbert's Interim and Final Places. Journal Article. SEL: Studies in English Literature 1500–1900, Vol. 24, No. 1, The English Renaissance (Winter, 1984), pp. 105–120

=== Books (non-fiction) ===
- Perspectives on poetry. Editor with James L. Calderwood. New York, Oxford University Press, 1968
- Perspectives on drama. Editor with James L. Calderwood. New York : Oxford University Press, 1968
- Perspectives on Fiction. Editor with James L. Calderwood. Oxford University Press, New York (1968)
- Essays in Shakespearean criticism. Editor with James L. Calderwood. Englewood Cliffs, N.J.. Prentice-Hall, 1970, ISBN 0132836556
- Pastoral Forms and Attitudes. University of California Press, 1972, ISBN 0520018966
- Animate Illusions: Explorations of Narrative Structure. University of Nebraska Press. 1973, ISBN 0803208316
- Animate illusions; explorations of narrative structure. Lincoln, University of Nebraska Press 1974, ISBN 0803208316
- Marvell's Ironic Vision. Yale University Press, 1981
- The Past That Poets Make. Harvard University Press, 1981, ISBN 0674656768
- Lyric Provinces in the English Renaissance. Ohio State Univ Pr; 1986, ISBN 0814203914
- Transported Styles in Shakespeare and Milton. Pennsylvania State University Press, 1989, ISBN 0271006463
- George Herbert's Christian Narrative. Penn State University Press; 2005, ISBN 0271026715

=== Books (fiction) ===
- Obituary Quilt (Bea Ellis Mysteries Series Vol. 1. (With Mary Toliver). Burgundy Books, 1998, ISBN 0966688007
- Done in Blood-Red Ochr. (With Mary Toliver). Pentland Press (NC), 2000, ISBN 1571972153
- Bitterroot Paperback. (With Mary Toliver). Pentland Press (NC), 2000, ISBN 1571971912
