= Peter Schreiner (Byzantinist) =

German Byzantinist (born 1940)

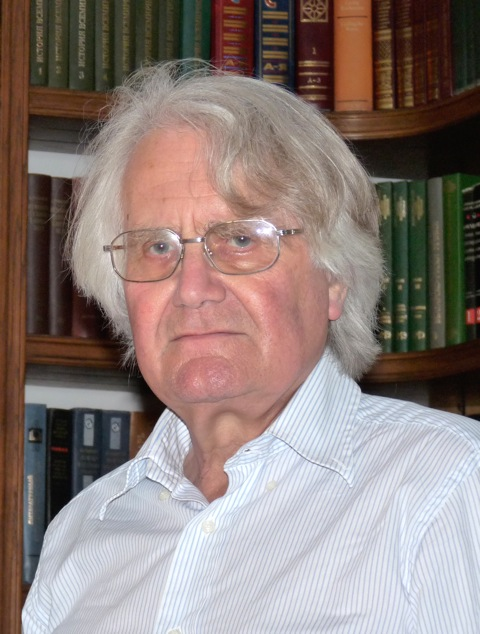
- Born: 4 May 1940; Munich, Munich-Upper Bavaria, Germany

Academic background
- Education: LMU Munich
- Thesis: Studien zu den Βραχέα χρονικά (1967)
- Doctoral advisor: Hans-Georg Beck

Academic work
- Discipline: Byzantine studies
- Sub-discipline: Greek palaeography History of Constantinople
- Institutions: Free University of Berlin (1972–1979); University of Cologne (1979–2005)
- Doctoral students: Andreas Külzer

Peter Schreiner (born 4 May 1940) is a German Byzantinist. He taught as a full professor of Byzantine studies at the University of Cologne from 1979 to 2005 and is one of the leading Byzantinists in German-speaking countries. He was the editor-in-chief of the Byzantinische Zeitschrift from 1992 to 2004 and the president of the International Association of Byzantine Studies from 2001 to 2011.

== Life and work ==
Peter Schreiner attended the humanistic Wilhelmsgymnasium in Munich and passed his Abitur there in 1961. He then studied Byzantine studies, middle Latin philology, ancient history and classical philology at LMU Munich. On 23 February 1967, he was awarded a doctorate with a thesis on the so-called minor Byzantine chronicles, written under the supervision of Hans-Georg Beck. From 1967 to 1968, he held a travel and research scholarship from the German Research Foundation and from 1968 to 1972 he worked as a scribe for Greek manuscripts at the Vatican Apostolic Library in Rome.

From 1972 to 1974, he was a research assistant at the Free University of Berlin. There he completed his habilitation in Byzantine studies in 1974. He was a private lecturer at the Free University of Berlin until 1979.

From 1979 to 2005, he was a full professor of Byzantine Studies and director of the Institute for Classical Studies at the University of Cologne. In 1992, he was a visiting professor at the École pratique des hautes études in Paris and in 2000 a visiting professor at the Collège de France.

From 1987 to 1993, he was a member of the advisory board of the Mediävistikverband. From 1992 to 1999 he was a co-editor of the Lexikon des Mittelalters. From 1992 to 2004, Peter Schreiner was the editor-in-chief of the Byzantinische Zeitschrift. From 2005 to 2009, he was chairman of the scientific advisory board of the German Study Center in Venice. He was the president of the International Association of Byzantine Studies from 2001 to 2011.

His research focuses on manuscript research (paleography, codicology, libraries), the urban history of Constantinople, Genoa, Venice and Byzantium. His research projects include, among other things, studies on the Sofia manuscript of Johannes Skylitzes, research on the settlements of Western merchants in Constantinople up to the end of the 12th century, as well as the edition and commentary of 100 inventory lists of private and church book collections from the 11th to the 15th century. He wrote a standard overview of the history of the Byzantine Empire, the fourth updated edition of which appeared in 2011.

Schreiner has received numerous scientific honors and memberships for his research. He was awarded the Medal of Honor from Sofia University in 1988. He has been a corresponding member of the Austrian Academy of Sciences since 1991, a member of the Göttingen Academy of Sciences and Humanities since 1993 and of the Istituto Siciliano di Studi Bizantini e Neoellenici since 1994, an honorary member of the Association of Russian Medievalists since 1998 and external member of the Istituto Veneto di Scienze, Lettere ed Arti since 2018. From 1986 to 2015, he was a member of the Southeast European Commission at the Göttingen Academy. He received honorary doctorates from the Veliko Tarnovo University (1992), University of Belgrade (2003), Sofia University (2004), University of Galați (2009) and the Democritus University of Thrace in Komotini (2014). In 2015, he received the Medal of Honor from the Eötvös College of Eötvös State University Budapest.

== Works ==
=== Monographs ===
- Studien zu den Brachea chronika (Miscellanea Byzantina Monacensia, 6). München: Institut für Byzantinistik und neugriechische Philologie der Universität München, 1967, DNB-IDN 458884979 (dissertation).
- Byzanz 565–1453 (Oldenbourg Grundriß der Geschichte, 22). München: Oldenbourg, 1986, ISBN 978-3-486-57750-1 (4th, updated edition 2011).
- Stadt und Gesetz – Dorf und Brauch. Versuch einer historischen Volkskunde von Byzanz: Methoden, Quellen, Gegenstände, Beispiele (Nachrichten der Akademie der Wissenschaften in Göttingen, Philologisch-historische Klasse, 9/2001). Göttingen: Vandenhoeck & Ruprecht, 2001, DNB-IDN 963445073.
- Konstantinopel. Geschichte und Archäologie (C. H. Beck Wissen, 2364). München: Beck, 2007, ISBN 978-3-406-50864-6 (Italian translation: Roma: Salerno Editrice, 2009, ISBN 978-88-8402-663-7).

=== Source editions ===
- Chronica Byzantina breviora = Die byzantinischen Kleinchroniken (Corpus Fontium Historiae Byzantinae, 12), 3 vols., Wien: Verlag der Österreichischen Akademie der Wissenschaften, 1975–1979.
- Texte zur spätbyzantinischen Finanz- und Wirtschaftsgeschichte in Handschriften der Biblioteca Vaticana (Studi e testi, 344). Città del Vaticano: Biblioteca Apostolica Vaticana, 1991, ISBN 88-210-0637-9.

=== Essay collections ===
- Byzantinische Kultur. Eine Aufsatzsammlung, collected short writings:
  - Band 1: Die Macht, ed. Silvia Ronchey, Elena Velkovska, Roma: Edizioni di Storia e Letteratura, 2006, ISBN 88-8498-210-3 (Inhaltsverzeichnis);
  - Band 2: Das Wissen, ed. Niels Gaul, Silvia Ronchey, Roma: Edizioni di Storia e Letteratura, 2009, ISBN 978-88-8498-211-7 (Inhaltsverzeichnis);
  - Band 3: Die materielle Kultur, ed. Christina Katsougiannopoulou and Silvia Ronchey, Roma: Edizioni di Storia e Letteratura, 2011, ISBN 978-88-8498-368-8 (Inhaltsverzeichnis);
  - Band 4: Die Ausstrahlung, ed. Silvia Ronchey and Raimondo Tocci, Roma: Edizioni di Storia e Letteratura, 2013, ISBN 978-88-6372-503-2 (Prefazione von Silvia Ronchey; Inhaltsverzeichnis).

== Bibliography ==
- "The writings of Peter Schreiner from the years 1965–2000", in Polypleuros nus. Miscellanea für Peter Schreiner zu seinem 60. Geburtstag, ed. Cordula Scholz, Georgios Makris (Byzantinisches Archiv, 19). München: Saur, 2000, pp. 415–429, ISBN 3-598-77742-6.
