= Franz Dölger =

German Byzantinist

Franz Dölger (Kleinwallstadt, 4 October 1891 – Munich, 5 November 1968) was a German Byzantinist. He is most notable for his crucial contributions to Byzantine diplomatics, and as the chief editor of the journal Byzantinische Zeitschrift from 1931 to 1963. A member of the Bavarian Academy of Sciences and Humanities, he received honorary doctorates from the universities of Athens, Thessaloniki and Sofia. In 1962, he was awarded the Order Pour le Mérite.

== Selected works ==
His bibliography up to 1951, which already comprised more than 200 titles counting articles, critical reviews and books only—but nearly 750 if adding short bibliographical notices, entries in the Lexicon für Theologie und Kirche (ed. M. Buchberger, X vols., Freiburg 1930–38), necrologies, and other minor works—was published by Volk, Otto (1951). "Franz Dölger – Bibliographie 1919–1951". Byzantinische Zeitschrift. 44—Festschrift Franz Dölger zum 60. Geburtstage gewidmet, hrsg. von Johannes M. Hoeck: 1*–50*.

- Dölger, Franz, ed. (1924). Corpus der griechischen Urkunden des Mittelalters und der neueren Zeit. Vol. A: Regesten – I/1: Regesten von 565 bis 1025. München – Berlin: R. Oldenbourg.
- Dölger, Franz, ed. (1925). Corpus der griechischen Urkunden des Mittelalters und der neueren Zeit. Vol. A: Regesten – I/2: Regesten von 1025 bis 1204. München – Berlin: R. Oldenbourg.
- Dölger, Franz (1927). Beiträge zur Geschichte der byzantinischen Finanzverwaltung, besonders des 10. und 11. Jahrhunderts. Byzantinisches Archiv, 9. Leipzig: Teubner.
- Dölger, Franz, ed. (1931). Facsimiles Byzantinisches Kaiserurkunden. München: Mittel- und neugriechisches Seminar der Universität.
- Dölger, Franz, ed. (1932). Corpus der griechischen Urkunden des Mittelalters und der neueren Zeit. Vol. A: Regesten – I/3: Regesten von 1204 bis 1282. München – Berlin: R. Oldenbourg.

== Sources ==
- Bernd Rill: Dölger, Franz (1891–1968). in: Rüdiger vom Bruch and Rainer A. Müller (eds.): Historikerlexikon. Von der Antike bis zum 20. Jahrhundert. Beck, Munich 1991, ISBN 3-406-33997-2, p. 73.
