= August Heisenberg =

German Byzantinist

- Born: Kaspar Ernst August Heisenberg; November 13, 1869; Osnabrück, Province of Hanover, Kingdom of Prussia, North German Confederation
- Died: November 22, 1930 (aged 61); Munich, Bavaria, Weimar Republic

Kaspar Ernst August Heisenberg (13 November 1869 – 22 November 1930) was a German Byzantinist. His son was theoretical physicist Werner Heisenberg.

Heisenberg came from a Westphalian family of craftsmen. He was the son of Wilhelm August Heisenberg (1831–1912), a locksmith (blacksmith) in and from Osnabrück, and Anna Maria Unnewehr (1835–1919).

== Education and career ==
Heisenberg attended the public school and the council gymnasium in Osnabrück and studied philosophy and other subjects in Marburg from 1888 and from 1889 in Munich, where he turned to classical philology and especially medieval Greek under the influence of Karl Krumbacher. In 1890 and 1891 he also studied in Leipzig. During his studies in Marburg, he became a member of what is now the Marburg fraternity Rheinfranken. In 1892 he became a Bavarian citizen and passed the first part of the state examination for higher teaching posts. He received his doctorate in 1894 from Krumbacher in Munich (on the textual history of Georgios Akropolites). In 1893 he became an assistant at the grammar school in Landau in der Pfalz (at that time part of Bavaria) and from 1893 he was at the Maximilians-Gymnasium in Munich. In 1895–1896 he did his military service in Osnabrück. In 1897 he became a teacher at the Gymnasium in Lindau. In 1898 and 1899 he travelled to Italy and Greece after receiving the Bavarian archaeological state grant. From 1899 he was at the Luitpold-Gymnasium in Munich and from autumn 1901 a high school teacher in Würzburg. In 1901 he habilitated in Medieval and Modern Greek philology in Würzburg, where he taught from 1908 as an honorary professor in addition to his work as a high school teacher. In order to advance his academic career, he wrote a series of scientific publications, mostly at night. In 1910, after the death of Karl Krumbacher, he became a professor of Byzantine Studies in Munich (Krumbacher's chair was the first chair of Byzantine Studies in Germany, then called the Chair of Medieval and Modern Greek Philology). In 1927 he was accepted as a corresponding member of what was then the Academy of Sciences of the Soviet Union.

== Personal life ==
August Heisenberg had been married to Annie née Wecklein (1871–1945) since 1899, the daughter of the classical philologist and high school director Nikolaus Wecklein (1843–1926), whom he had known from his pedagogical internship in Munich. The couple had two sons, physicist and Nobel Prize winner Werner Heisenberg (1901–1976) and chemist Erwin Heisenberg (1900–1965). His wife worked as a high school teacher and scientist. She aspired to a university career, correcting tests and even learning Russian to support him in his scientific work.
