= Versions of the Infancy Gospel of Thomas =

Manuscripts of an apocryphal gospel

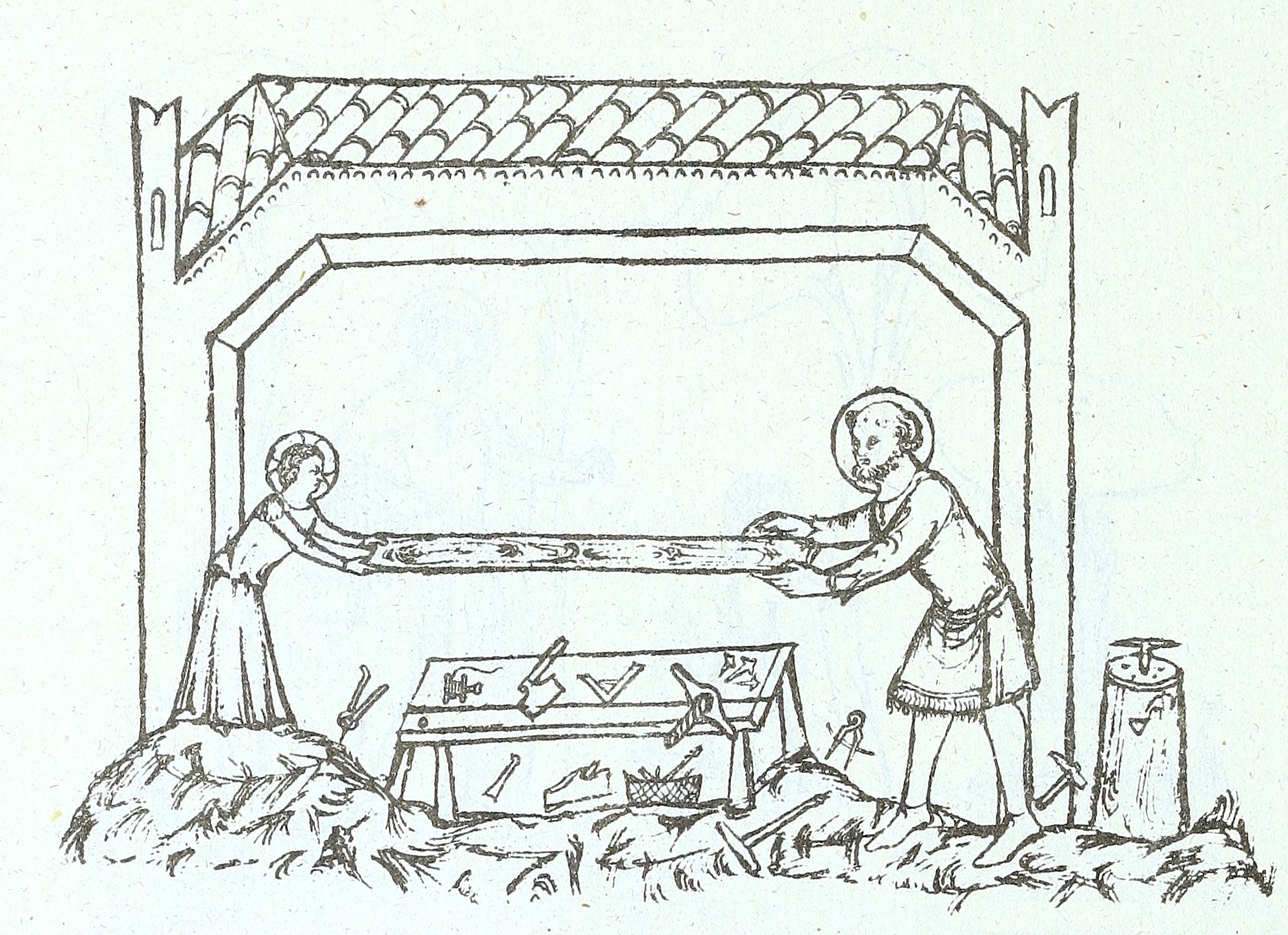
Jesus miraculously stretches wood to help Joseph on a woodworking project. From an illustrated manuscript of the Latin Gospel of Pseudo-Matthew, which includes a section directly taken from the Childhood of Jesus.

The Infancy Gospel of Thomas, also known as the Paidika, the Childhood of Jesus, and the Infancy of Jesus, has an unusually complex manuscript tradition. It was popular among Christians during antiquity and the Middle Ages, and spread widely. However, there was no authority keeping copies standardized. As scribes copied and re-copied hand-written manuscripts, changes accumulated.

The structure of the work is largely a collection of self-contained stories. When translated into new languages, the translations often adjusted stories within. New stories were added in some versions, and other stories were removed. The work was also integrated into a variety of larger collections and anthologies. As a result, the topic is more a cluster of related individual books that share similarities, rather than one unified book with minor variations.

== Overview ==
Early Christians were interested in more details than those provided by the earliest sources. This led to a proliferation in Christian literature. Works which were not included in the New Testament in the church councils of the 4th, 5th, and 6th stories were later classified as New Testament apocrypha. These included works later classified as "infancy gospels" that detailed both Jesus's birth and his childhood in more detail than the stories found in the Gospel of Luke and the Gospel of Matthew.

One early collection appears to have been called something like "The Boyhood Deeds of Our Lord and Savior Jesus Christ". It is not known precisely when this collection was made, but surviving writings from 2nd- and 3rd-century Christians indicate that the stories within it were circulating by then in Koine Greek, and there are surviving mostly-complete manuscripts of the work in Latin and Syriac from the 5th and 6th century. This collection appears to have been popular, and spread among the Christian population of the era. This included the creation of translations into other languages. Languages with pre-modern translations include Latin, Syriac, Georgian, Armenian, Ethiopic (Ge'ez), Irish, Medieval Greek, and Church Slavonic. By the late medieval era, the stories spread to various European vernacular languages as well, generally from the Latin version.

The Greek and Slavonic versions include a pseudepigraphic attribution to "Thomas the Israelite", which led to the work being called the "Gospel of Thomas" in the 19th and early 20th century. However, this attribution is rare in other versions. For consistency and clarity, this article uses the Childhood of Jesus title across versions, to account for the Thomas-less versions.

Stemma of translations and versions of the Infancy Gospel of Thomas over time. The estimated chronology is left to right: the hypothesized Greek original is c. 2nd century; Syriac and Early Latin are c. 3rd century; the long Greek S form and Georgian are c. 4th–7th centuries; Arabic, Irish, Armenian, and Ethiopic are c. 6th–9th centuries; Slavonic was translated c. 10th–11th centuries; and Pseudo-Matthew acquiring the Childhood of Jesus content happened c. 11th century, with the second Latin translation c. 12th–13th century.

=== Episodes not in Greek A ===
Manuscripts of the Infancy Gospel of Thomas differ. While some core stories ("pericopes" in scholarly terms) are usually included and shared, some stories appear in some branches of the tradition but not others. The lack of canonical status may have loosened constraints on scribal adjustments somewhat by those who copied and recopied the text.

Being listed here does not mean it was in all manuscripts of an edition, just some of them. This is especially the case for Pseudo-Matthew, with its great number and diversity of manuscripts and languages. Notable other stories found in manuscripts alongside the Greek A pericopes include (using Reidar Aasgaard's titles):

- Playing with Lions: At age 8 and near the Jordan River, Jesus enters a cave with lions and plays with them, to the astonishment of a crowd somehow watching from a safe distance. Found in Pseudo-Matthew (C35-36).
- Making Joseph Raise a Dead Man: Jesus tells Joseph to heal a dead man on a stretcher; to Joseph's surprise, he is able to. Found in Pseudo-Matthew.
- Sharing a Meal with His Family: Jesus and his extended family share a meal; Jesus blesses it and is the first one to eat and drink. Found in Pseudo-Matthew (C42).
- Jesus and the Dyer: Many variants, but the core is that Jesus helps out a dyer as a child servant, but seemingly errs by combining the dyes and clothes into one big mess. However, when the clothes are pulled from the vat, they are all perfectly dyed the correct colors as ordered. Found in one manuscript (BnF Gr. 239) of Greek A, Ethiopic, Arabic (C11), the Arabic Gospel of the Infancy (C37), the Armenian Gospel of the Infancy (C21), Pseudo-Matthew, and Slavonic (Ukrainian MS G C13).
- Miraculous Repair of King's Throne: Joseph builds a throne for the "King of Jerusalem", but it is too small. Jesus fixes and expands it. Found in the Arabic Gospel of the Infancy (C39).
- Children Made Goats / Children Made Swine: Jesus is playing with children, but they hide after lunch. After Jesus inquires at a home where the others are hiding what the noise is, he is told that it is just animals: goats in earlier variants, pigs in later variants. Jesus says "let it be so", and the hiding children are transformed into the claimed animal. Jesus changes them back to human form at the end in Slavonic and the Arabic Gospel of the Infancy, but not the Arabic. Found in the Arabic (C6), Arabic Gospel of the Infancy (C40), East Syriac (P70–72), the Gospel of Pseudo-Matthew, and Slavonic, although the Slavonic version is not particularly close to the other versions.
- Children Make Jesus King: Jesus' playmates give Jesus a crown of flowers and a royal 'carpet' of clothes, and make passerby bow down before him. Found in the Arabic Gospel of the Infancy (C41) and East Syriac (P72).
- Riding the Sunbeam: This story varies, but Jesus walks on, sits on, or rides a sunbeam. Found in Ethiopic (C8), Armenian Gospel of the Infancy (15:5), Pseudo-Matthew (C58), and Slavonic.
- Healing of a Blind Man: Two mothers are concerned with an illness afflicting their sons, blinding and weakening them. Mary offers them some water which she used to wash her son Jesus. The water cures their blindness. Found in the Arabic Infancy Gospel (C27-28) and Slavonic.
- Jesus and the Blacksmith: A blacksmith cannot shoe a horse. Jesus takes the legs off the horse, takes the legs to the anvil where they are shoed directly, then reattaches the legs to the horse. He orders the blacksmith to throw an old woman into the fire; he then reforges her body. Found in Slavonic (Ukrainian versions only; MS G C22).
- Healing of Man with Serpent: A man has had a serpent wrapped around his neck for three years. Jesus tells the serpent to go back to the ground. Found in East Syriac (P73–74).
- Healing of Boy on an Ass: A boy on a donkey has been beaten by thieves and had his belongings stolen. His father weeps for the family. Jesus heals the boy. Found in East Syriac (P75).
- Making Dead Fish Come Alive: Jesus plays with a salted fish and orders it to swim again, which it does. The circumstances differ; sometimes Joseph cooks and salts some fish first, sometimes it occurs in Egypt. Other adults are terrified. Found in Greek D (P4) and in Pseudo-Matthew (C59).
- Healing of Child's Snakebite: A boy is bitten by a venomous snake. Jesus commands the snake to suck back its poison, curses it and causes it to burst open, then heals the poisoned boy. Found in the Arabic Gospel of the Infancy (C42) and in East Syriac (P72-73).
- Pagan Temple: Jesus tears down a pagan temple. In some accounts, he rebuilds it. Found in Slavonic (both groups; Ukrainian MS G C17).

== Greek ==
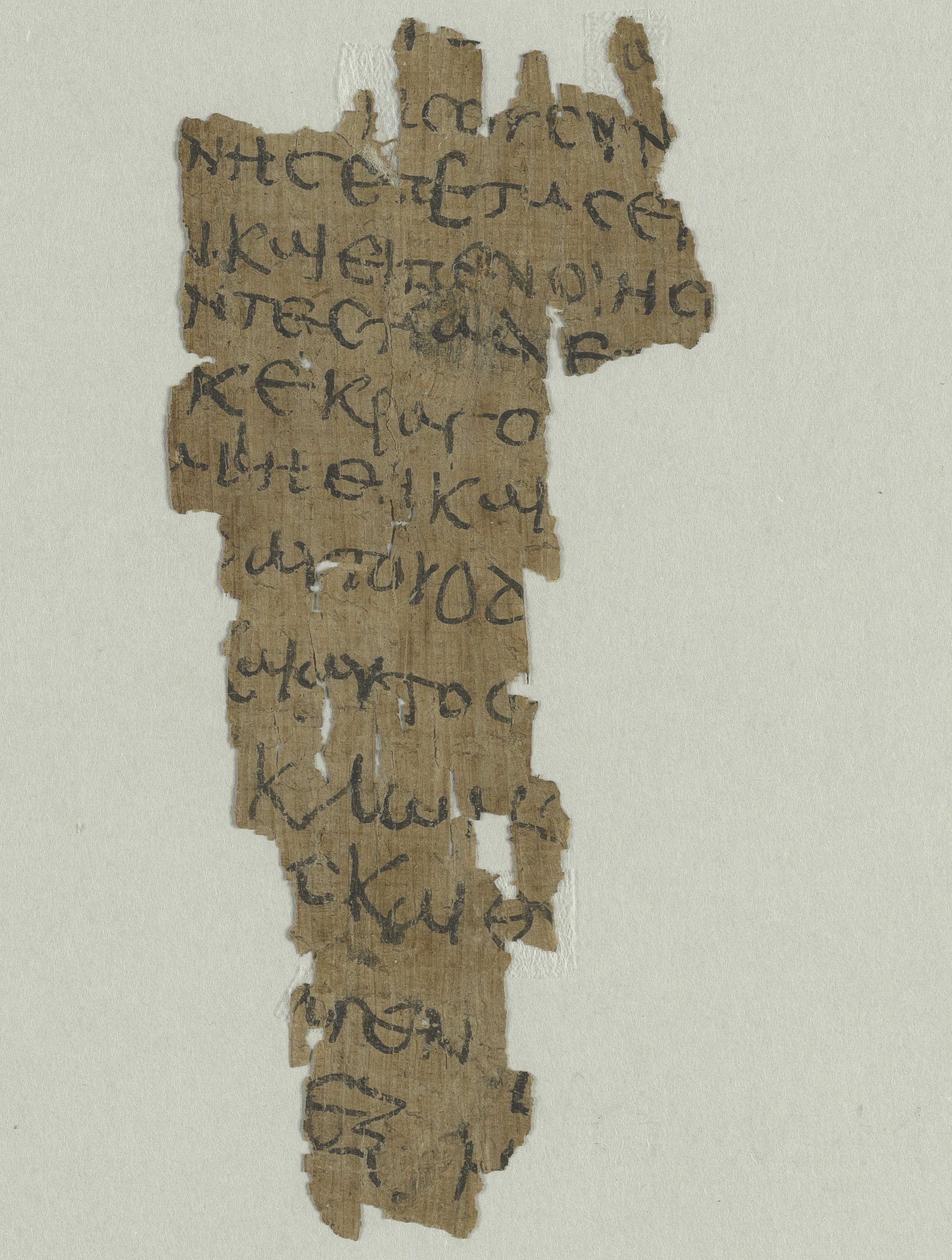
Papyrus Hamburg Graeca 1011, the earliest known surviving fragment of the work, from Roman Egypt in Greek, created around the 4th or 5th century

I, Thomas the Israelite, make this report to all of you, my brothers among the Gentiles, that you may know the magnificent childhood activities of our Lord Jesus Christ—all that he did after being born in our country. (Note: Ἀναγγέλλω ὑμῖν ἐγὼ Θωμᾶς Ἰσραηλίτης πᾶσι τοῖς ἐξ ἐθνῶν ἀδελφοῖς γνωρίσαι τὰ παιδικὰ καὶ μεγαλεῖα τοῦ κυρίου ἡμῶν Ἰησοῦ Χριστοῦ, ὅσα ἐποίησεν γεννηθεὶς ἐν τῇ χώρᾳ ἡμῶν. Anangéllo ymín egó Thomás Israilítis pási toís ex ethnón adelfoís gnorísai tá paidiká kaí megaleía toú kyríou imón Iisoú Christoú, ósa epoíisen gennitheís en tí chóra imón.)

— Childhood of Jesus (Greek A), 1:1

Koine Greek is believed to be the original language of composition of the Childhood of Jesus. As early as the 2nd century, the Christian polemicist Irenaeus of Lyons, writing in Greek, mentioned a story found in early versions of the Childhood of Jesus, albeit with hostility. However, the very oldest surviving complete manuscripts are generally in other languages; for a variety of reasons, including the fall of the Greek-Christian dominated Byzantine Empire, the surviving Greek manuscripts tend to be from the medieval period.

There is one piece of surviving Greek evidence from antiquity, Papyrus Hamburg Graeca 1011, a fourth- or fifth-century papyrus fragment. Its importance as a witness to old forms of the Childhood of Jesus was realized in 2024. The fragment largely matches the 11th-century Codex Sabaiticus version where they can be compared. This suggests that likely a similar edition of the Childhood of Jesus existed at the time; if the fragment was a witness to an independent rendition of the same story, then the rendition was carried over near-exactly by the later compiler.

The surviving Greek versions include an introduction from the author (Chapter 1), with it claiming to have been written by "Thomas the Israelite". Due to the popularity of the Greek edition among scholars, this resulted in the title of the work in the modern era often being "Gospel of Thomas" and later "Infancy Gospel of Thomas". However, this feature is not generally shared with most other versions, and was most likely added only in the medieval era. This was presumably a reference to Thomas the Apostle, also known as Judas Thomas, who was thought in some early Christian traditions to be a brother of Jesus and thus familiar with his activities.

Another reference that crept into the longer Greek versions but not seen in most translations is a loose reference to 1 Corinthians 13:1. Jesus complains that Zacchaeus's teaching "is like a noisy gong or a clanging cymbal which can’t provide the sound or glory or power of insight." (Note: Compare 1 Corinthians 13:1 and Inf. Gos. Thom. 6:8.)

The Greek form is the most heavily studied version. Translations of it include, but are not limited to:

- Aasgaard, Reidar (2009). The Childhood of Jesus: Decoding the Apocryphal Infancy Gospel of Thomas. Cascade Books. pp. 233–242. ISBN 978-1-60608-126-6.
- Burke, Tony (2010). De Infantia Iesu Evangelium Thomae Graecae. Corpus Christianorum Series Apocryphorum 17. Brepols. pp. 302–463. ISBN 9782503534190. (See also online versions at Greek S, Greek A, Greek B, Greek D)
- Cowper, Benjamin. H. (1874) [1867]. The Apocryphal Gospels and other documents relating to the History of Christ . Frederic Norgate. pp. 128–143 – via Wikisource. (Greek A; see also The Gospel of Thomas (II.), pp. 144–151, Greek B).
- Ehrman, Bart; Pleše, Zlatko (2011). The Apocryphal Gospels: Texts and Translations. Oxford University Press. pp. 3–29. ISBN 978-0-19-973210-4.
- Elliott, James Keith (1993). The Apocryphal New Testament. Oxford University Press. pp. 68–83. ISBN 0-19-826182-9.
- Hock, Ronald (1995). The Infancy Gospels of James and Thomas. The Scholars Bible 2. Polebridge Press. pp. 103–143. ISBN 0-944344-47-X.
- James, M. R. (1924). The Apocryphal New Testament . Clarendon Press. pp. 49–65 – via Wikisource. (see also Appendixes to the Gospel of Thomas, pp. 66–70.)

=== Greek S ===
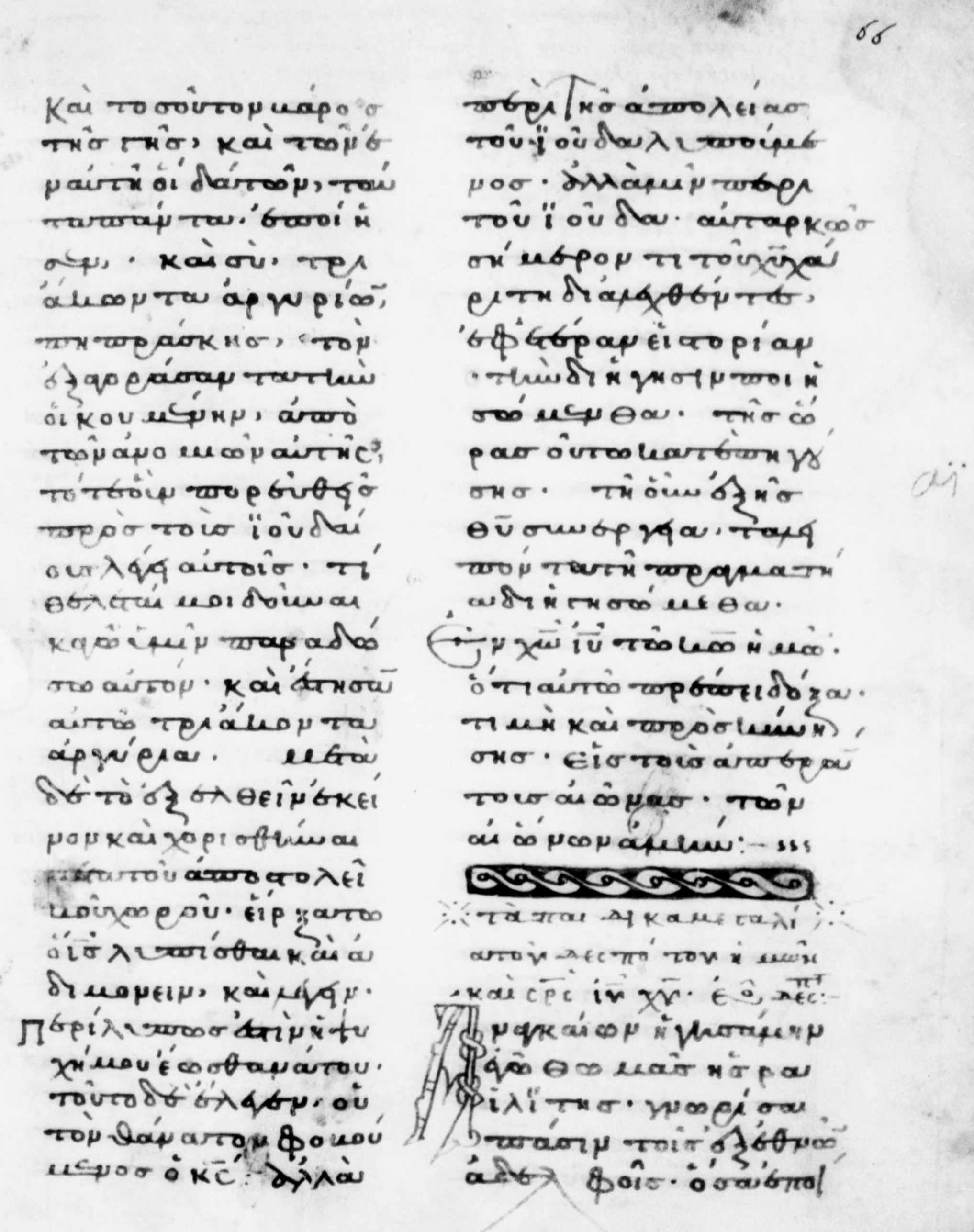
The start of the Infancy Gospel of Thomas in the Codex Sabaiticus 259, 66r

Greek S is a recension based on the oldest surviving complete manuscript, Codex Sabaiticus 259. Sabaiticus 259 was commissioned by a kouboukleisios named Basil on Valva on the island of Cyprus. It was copied by a monk named Gerasimos in 1089 or 1090 according to the date of the colophon. It was transferred to various locations over time, including time spent at the Monastery of Mar Saba (hence "S" for Sabaiticus). The manuscript is now held by the library of the Greek Patriarchate of Jerusalem. There are some minor difficulties of interpretation as the copyist of this manuscript was quite bad at Greek spelling.

The work is an "intermediate" form of the text; longer than the short recensions seen in Syriac and Early Latin, but shorter than Greek A and Greek D, as it lacks chapters 17 and 18. It also places Greek A chapter 10 after Ga 16 but before Ga19. While the manuscript is from the 11th century, scholars have suggested this form of the work could have originated as early as between the 4th and 7th centuries. Notably, the Slavonic translation seems to be a late 10th or early 11th century work, yet already working from Greek A. It is also the oldest form featuring the introduction attributing itself to "Thomas the Israelite".

Scholarly notice of the manuscript came substantially later than exploration of the other recensions. The scholarship of Sever J. Voicu (1991), Tony Burke (2001, 2010), and Reider J. Aasgaard (2009) raised the profile of Greek S as an important witness to the evolution of the Childhood of Jesus and a more relevant witness to the form of the work in late antiquity than the medieval Greek A.

One odd difference in Greek S involves the fate of the child who fell from the roof, Zeno (or Zenon). After Jesus resurrects him so that he can exonerate Jesus as not the cause of his fall, Jesus then tells Zeno to "fall asleep" – that is, die again. Why exactly this happens is unclear, but the later Greek versions do not include this, and leave Zeno alive.

=== Greek A ===
Greek A is the best-known version of the Childhood of Jesus. Its fame comes from Constantin von Tischendorf's research and inclusion of it in his 1853 book Evangelia apocrypha, the premier collection of Christian apocrypha sources for decades. Tischendorf based his edition on four fifteenth century manuscripts, and Tischendorf's version has been used as the basis for many translations into other languages by modern scholars since. Reidar Aasgaard has suggested that the recension as a whole may have originated around the 9th century.

Compared with Greek S, Greek A includes Chapters 17 and 18, which feature a helpful Jesus performing miracles of healing a dead baby and a dead laborer, akin to his depiction in the Synoptic Gospels. This softens his depiction and helps feed an implicit narrative of "Young Jesus learning to control his powers", a likely more palatable and compelling reading to medieval Christians. One version of the Greek A manuscript also features the withered son of Annas being explicitly healed, rather than sweeping it up into Jesus undoing his cursing in general upon prodding.

Many manuscripts include "Thomas" saying Jesus was "born in our region Bethlehem from [the] region [of] Nazareth," either a poorly written sentence or a scribe who did not understand Judean geography very well, as Bethlehem and Nazareth are not particularly close. The Greek A set favored by Tischendorf cuts this out and simply says "our country" instead.

There are seven or eight manuscripts classified as belonging to the A recension:

- Codex Hist. gr. 91, held by the Austrian National Library in Vienna, a 14th or 15th century manuscript, 199v–204r.
- Codex Vatopedi 37, held by the Monastery of Vatopedi, 21v–28r. Most of the manuscript was copied in the 14th century, including the folios relevant to the Childhood of Jesus, but some folios are from the 16th century, presumably to replace damaged pages.
- A group of four very similar manuscripts. Their version of chapter 6 varies from the other manuscripts in the recension, and is shorter. This is the tradition Tischendorf found and published:
  - Bologna Univ. 2702, held by the Biblioteca universitaria di Bologna, a 15th-century manuscript, 76v–87v.
  - Dresden A 187, held by the Saxon State and University Library Dresden, a 16th-century manuscript, pp. 523–530.
  - Samos Gr. 54, held by the Metropolitan Library of Samos, a 15th- or 16th-century manuscript, pp. 9–21.
  - Codex Lavra Θ (Theta) 222, held by the Great Lavra monastic community of Mount Athos, a 15th-century manuscript, 20r–28r. It has nearly identical readings to Samos Gr. 54; they were likely copies of the same manuscript, or one of the other.
- Ancien Fonds gr. 239, held by the National Library of France (BnF), created in 1422 or 1423, 118v-119v. An incomplete manuscript; only chapters 1–6, followed by Jesus and the Dyer, remain.
- Philos. Gr. 162, held by the Austrian National Library in Vienna, 180r–187v. A fragmentary manuscript that only goes from Chapters 1–7, remaining contents missing and unknown. Tony Burke has written that it is unclear whether this should be classified as Greek A or Greek S.

=== Greek B ===
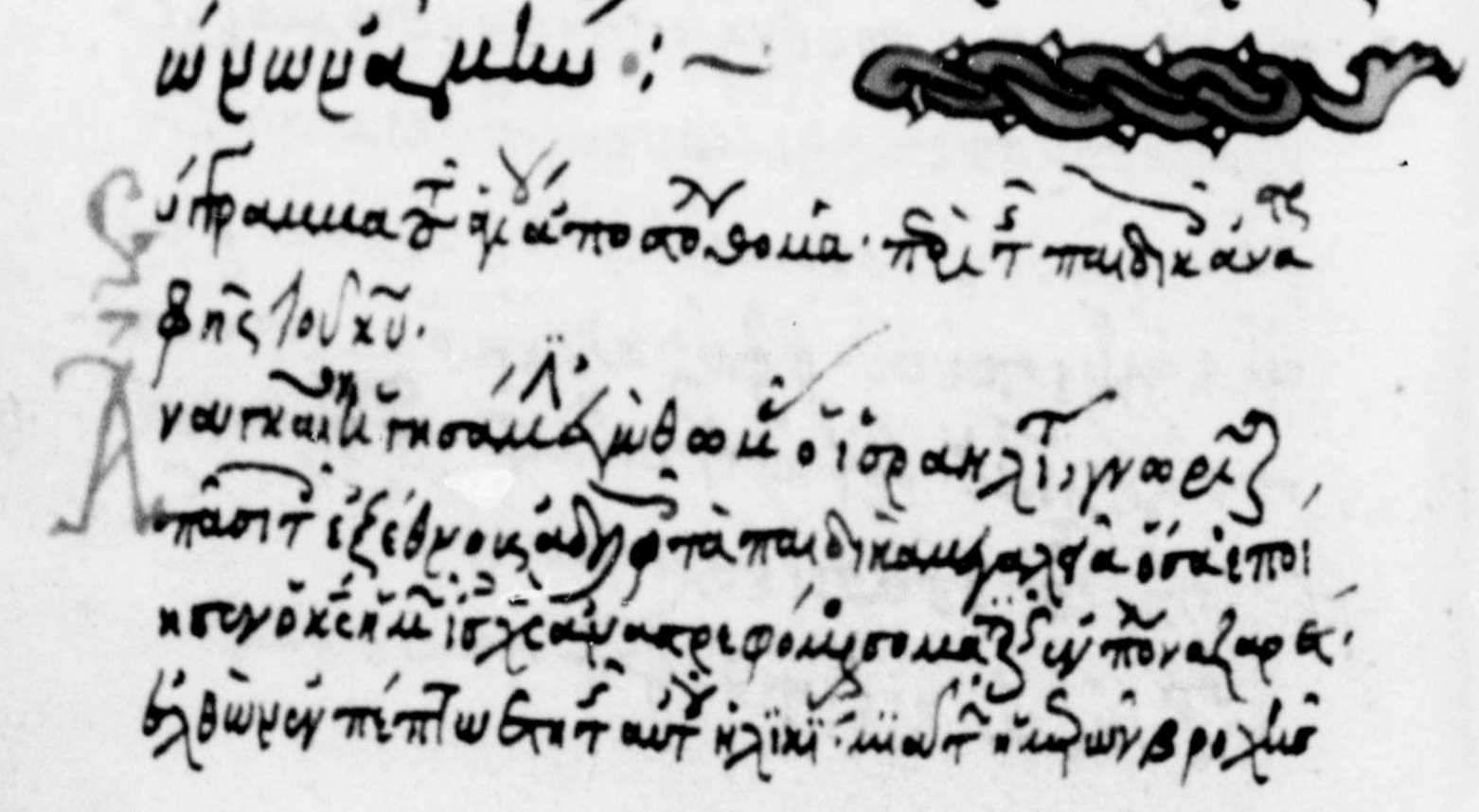
The start of the Greek B version; the title reads "Treatise of the Holy Apostle Thomas, concerning the conduct of the Lord when a child." (Note: Σύγγραμμα τοῦ ἁγίου ἀποστόλου Θωμᾶ περὶ τῆς παιδικῆς ἀναστροφῆς τοῦ κυρίου Sýngramma toú agíou apostólou Thomá perí tís paidikís anastrofís toú kyríou.)

Greek B is a later and abbreviated form of Greek A. It shortens some sections and leaves other chapters out entirely for 11 chapters in total. Chapters 8, 12, and 14–19 of Greek A are not included, and chapters 5-7 are shortened. It is largely based on a manuscript from Saint Catherine's Monastery on Mount Sinai that Constantin von Tischendorf published, Codex Sinaiticus Greek 453 (109v-113r), not to be confused with the more famous Codex Sinaiticus. Greek 453 was created in the 14th or 15th century. One other manuscript from the same monastery, Sinaiticus Greek 532, is similar, and is from the 15th or 16th century.

One area where Greek B differs from Greek A, but matches Greek S, is in its single Jesus and a teacher episode. It includes the older saying of "Alpha" directly akin to what Irenaeus had complained about, while Greek A, while keeping a dialogue about the mystic properties of "Alpha", lacks the back-and-forth saying of Alpha.

=== Greek D ===
Greek D is a form of the Childhood of Jesus that is largely similar to Greek A. Its most notable difference is its inclusion of a prologue set during the Flight to Egypt. While the very oldest forms of the Childhood seemed to be most familiar with the Gospel of Luke, by the time Greek D was written, it seems that Christians who knew all four canonical gospels were more common, as the Egypt episode occurs only in the Gospel of Matthew. The recension also differs from Greek A in attributing itself to James, brother of Jesus as the claimed author, rather than "Thomas the Israelite."

Tony Burke loosely dates this recension as likely originating between the 10th century and the 13th century. It was likely the source of the Late Latin translation. Awareness of this version in the modern era was due to Armand Delatte, who published it in print in 1927; the "D" is a reference to his last name.

This recension is known by three manuscripts:

- Codex Athenienses Gr. 355, a 15th-century manuscript held by the National Library of Greece.
- Palatinus Gr. 364, a 15th-century manuscript held by the Vatican Library. It is cut off and only has the introduction, Chapter 1, and part of Chapter 2.
- Codex theol Gr. 123, a fragmentary and damaged manuscript from the second half of the 13th century held by the Austrian National Library.

== Latin ==
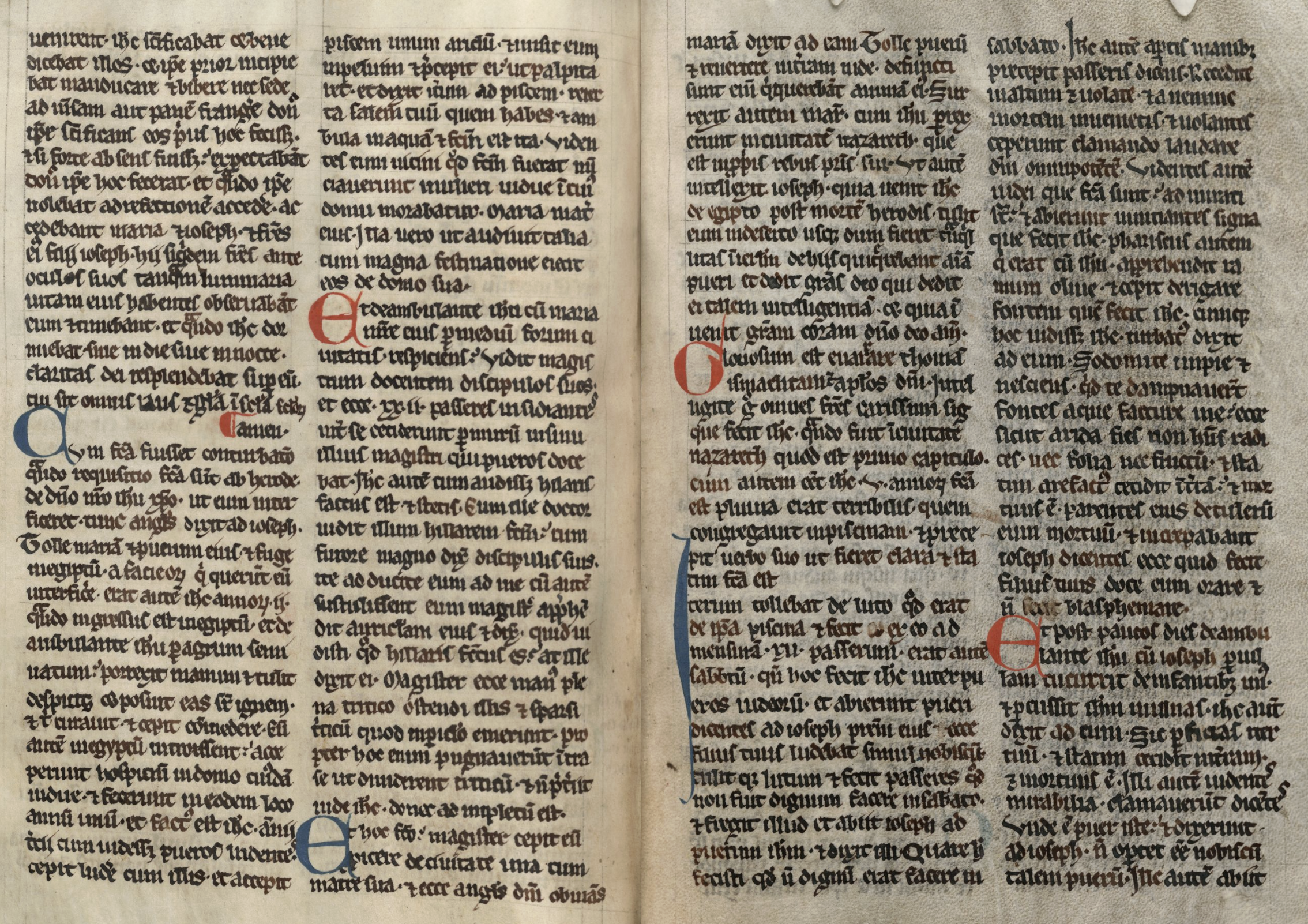
A 12th- or 13th-century manuscript of the Latin Gospel of Pseudo-Matthew, one of the earliest that contains the later LT translation which includes the Flight to Egypt. Cambridge, Corpus Christi College, MS 288, 78v-79r.

Jesus sat in the cave and the lion cubs ran about around his feet, fawning and playing with him. Indeed, the older lions, bowing their heads, stood at a distance and worshipped him, and wagged their tails before him.

— Gospel of Pseudo-Matthew, pars altera, 35:6-7

The Childhood of Jesus was translated into Latin two separate times. The first translation ("Early Latin") was made c. 3rd century and used the shorter recension as a source, while the second ("Late Latin") was done c. 11th century and used the longer recension as its baseline. No other tradition has as many manuscripts as does Latin.

The oldest extant Latin translation is found in the palimpsest Vindobenensis 563, specifically its fourth codex, held by the Austrian National Library in Vienna. The manuscript is fragmentary, so only portions can be read. It is probably of Northern Italian provenance. Its text is called LV for short by scholars. The palimpsest also contains portions of the (canonical) Gospel of Matthew and the Gospel of Nicodemus. The manuscript likely dates to the 5th or 6th century. It contains the fragments of chapters 2 (Sparrows), 4–5 (Careless Boy, Joseph's Rebuke), 7–9 (First Teacher & Zeno, although First Teacher is missing major sections), 14 (Second Teacher), and 19 (Temple at Jerusalem).

The oldest versions of the Gospel of Pseudo-Matthew are a Latin adaptation of the Gospel of James with various updates to avoid clashing with medieval Catholic theology, such as not claiming Jesus had brothers, a matter Catholic theologians strongly condemned. At some point, the work was expanded to include material from the Childhood of Jesus as well; Constantin von Tischendorf named this section the pars altera. These are in chapters 26-42 of Pseudo-Matthew. The oldest extant copy of Pseudo-Matthew which includes the material is from the 11th century (BnF lat. 1772). The tradition it represents is called LM. It drew upon sources similar to LV. LV and LM are considered together the "Early Latin" translation.

Around 76 surviving manuscripts of Latin Pseudo-Matthew include the LM version of the Childhood of Jesus. The LM versions tend to include Mary more; various scenes which had only Joseph are expanded to include both Joseph and Mary. For example, BnF lat. 1772 has Jesus outright kill the child who destroyed his pools (rather than wither him), but when the parents complain to Joseph and Mary (rather than just Joseph), Jesus, "not wishing to grieve his mother", raises the dead boy back to life.

The "Late Latin" translation is called LT and was an independent new translation from the Greek D recension, which includes a prologue with the Flight to Egypt depicted in the (canonical) Gospel of Matthew. As time passed, manuscripts of the Gospel of Pseudo-Matthew were created that mixed content from both the LM and the LT versions. These traditions became blurred together.

As there is a diversity in the sources, most aspects of the Latin translation are not necessarily standardized, and individual manuscripts have their own slants and context. That said, analysts have picked out various trends. Marijana Vukovic sees the later LT variants as generally "humanizing" Jesus, emphasizing his childlike aspects compared to earlier versions which may have played more on his divine power and authority.

Like some other medieval versions, some increase anti-Jewish rhetoric. Medieval depictions often wrote of Jesus as if he and the Holy Family were not Jews themselves but were proto-Christians living in the midst of hostile Jews. In some manuscripts, young Jesus, talking to Zacchaeus the teacher, says he will end Zacchaeus's genealogy once he comes to power. (Jesus also still revokes his curses when addressing a crowd, though.) In Latin 2688, Jews are depicted as enemies of Jesus; those that Jesus attacks are denounced in harsh terms (the child who destroyed his pools is ‘son of the devil, with a hateful character’ (filius dyaboli animo invido)). After the child dies, ‘the shouting of the Jews' (clamatio Judeorum) is mentioned as complaining. BnF lat. 1772 and Dijon, Bibl. mun. 38 also feature strong anti-Jewish sentiment. Others do not; manuscript Ambrosiana SP II, for example, omits and minimizes the provocations upon young Jesus by the community, and avoids constructing Jesus as a target of fear and hatred from the local Jewish community. Instead, it depicts the Jewish community as recognizing and admiring Jesus's wisdom and power.

Pamela Sheingorn also writes that the two manuscripts emphasize different attitudes toward what the Christ Child was, despite working from the same material. Lat. 2688 is more a precursor of adult Jesus, who could be prickly at times. Ambrosiana SP II, written somewhat later, is a more human and more childlike Jesus, a wonderful presence whom everyone loves.

A translation of the Gospel of Pseudo-Matthew, including the pars altera, can be found at:

- Hawk, Brandon W. (2019). The Gospel of Pseudo-Matthew and the Nativity of Mary. Westar Tools and Translations 8. Cascade Books. pp. 83–108. ISBN 978-1-5326-3715-5.
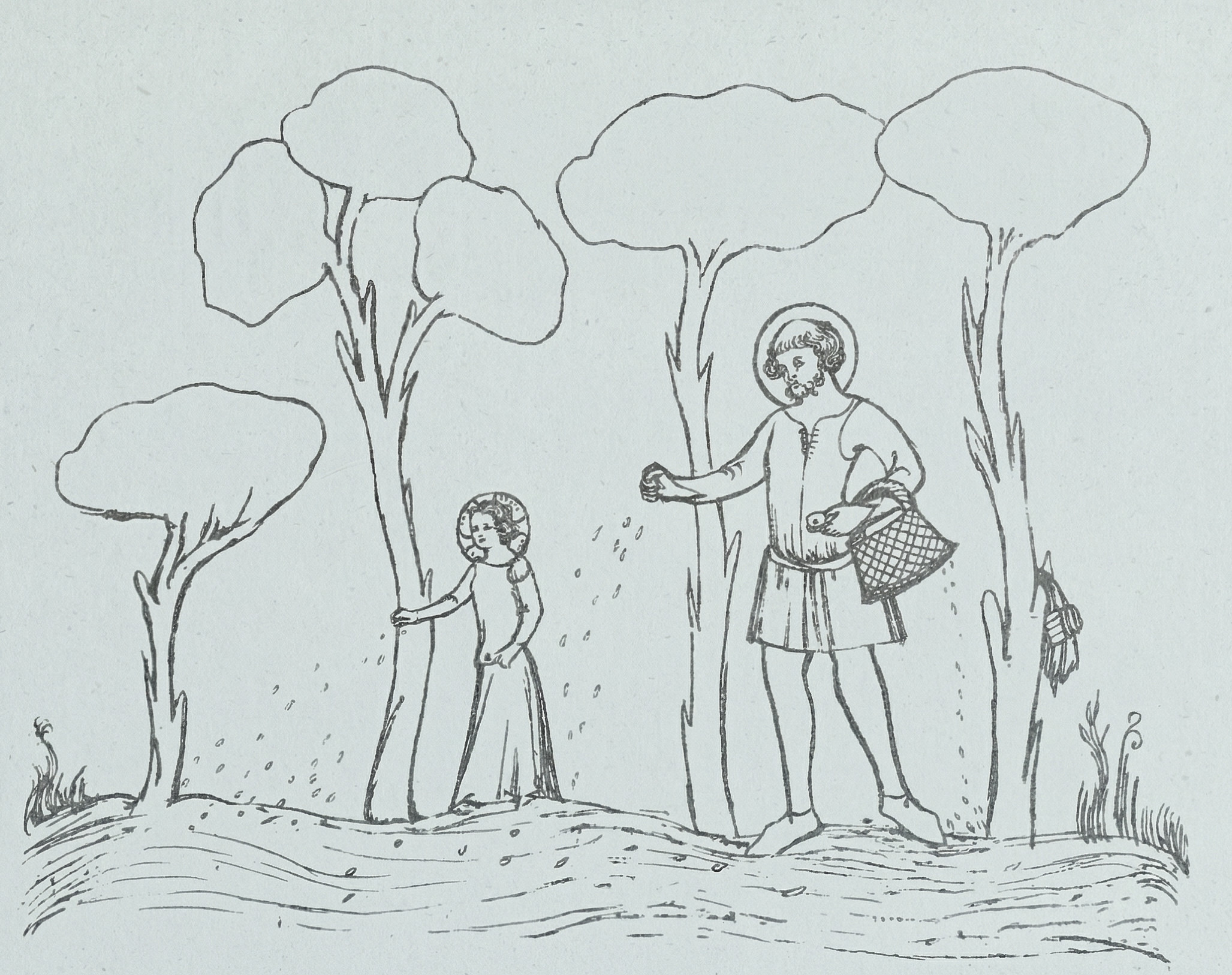
Jesus and Joseph sowing seeds, from Biblioteca Ambrosiana SP II 64

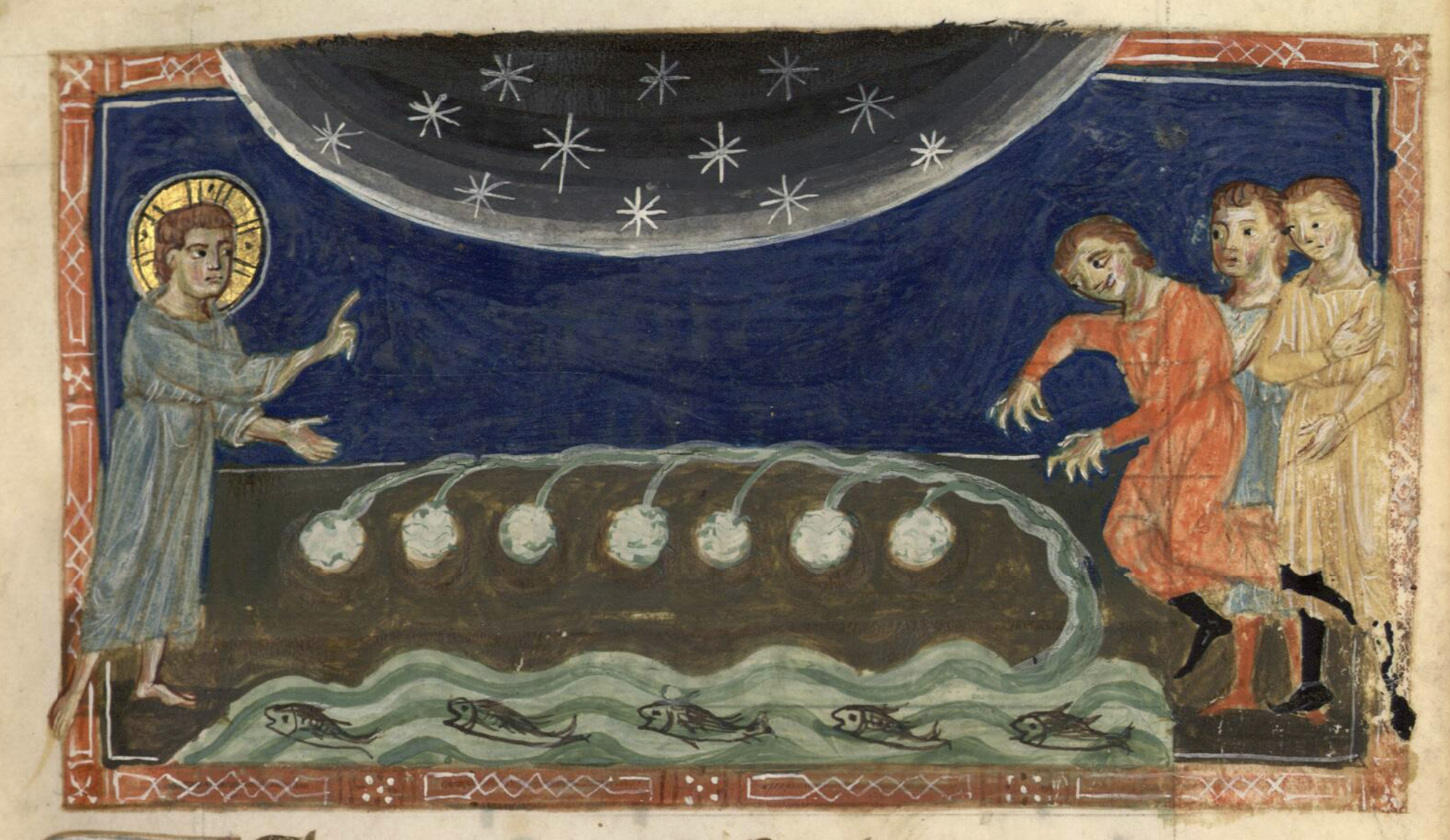
Jesus threatens the son of Annas near the pools of purified water, from BnF Latin 2688

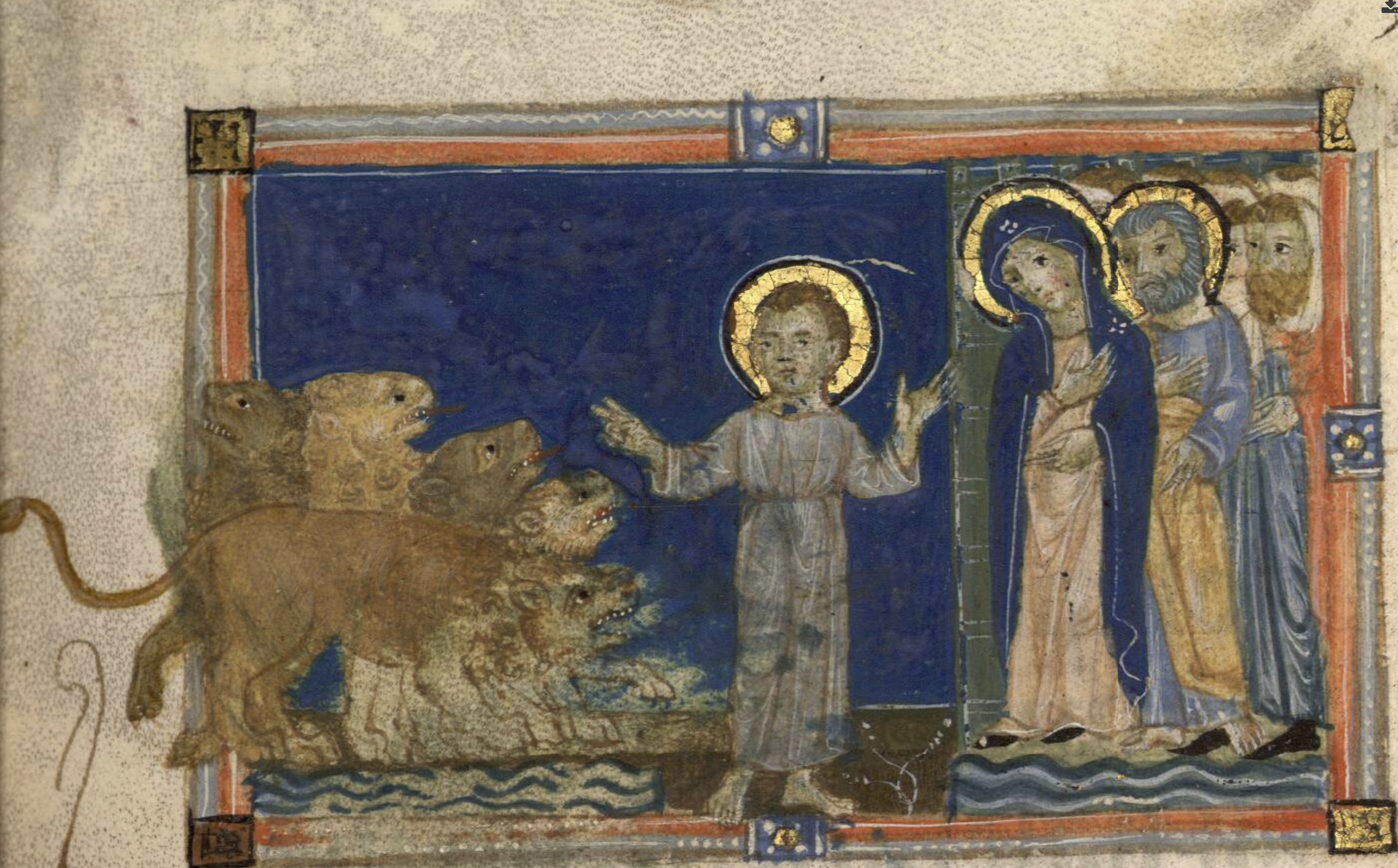
Jesus playing with lions, from BnF Latin 2688

=== Translations of the Latin ===
Ȝur sone wantoun & wylde,
Wiþ his cursyng haþ slayn oure childe

Your son wanton & wild,
With his cursing hath slain our child.

— Cursor Mundi, a Middle English poem on the history of the world, including content from Pseudo-Matthew; in this section, the complaining parents.

The Gospel of Pseudo-Matthew was very popular, and was translated into many vernacular languages of Europe. Just as the Latin versions differed from each other, these versions also differed, and many included the childhood miracle stories. Some languages with attested translations of Latin Pseudo-Matthew that included the pars altera include German, Danish, Provençal, French, Middle English, and Old Czech.

These editions have their own quirks. For one example, Mary Dzon notes that the tale of Jesus and the Dyer, as well as Jesus transforming his playmates into pigs, are not common in Latin versions, but are seen commonly in Middle English and medieval French. For another example, two manuscripts of Pseudo-Matthew translated into Old Czech survive, but are in versified form as poetic renditions. This practice is seen with other apocryphal Czech literature as well.

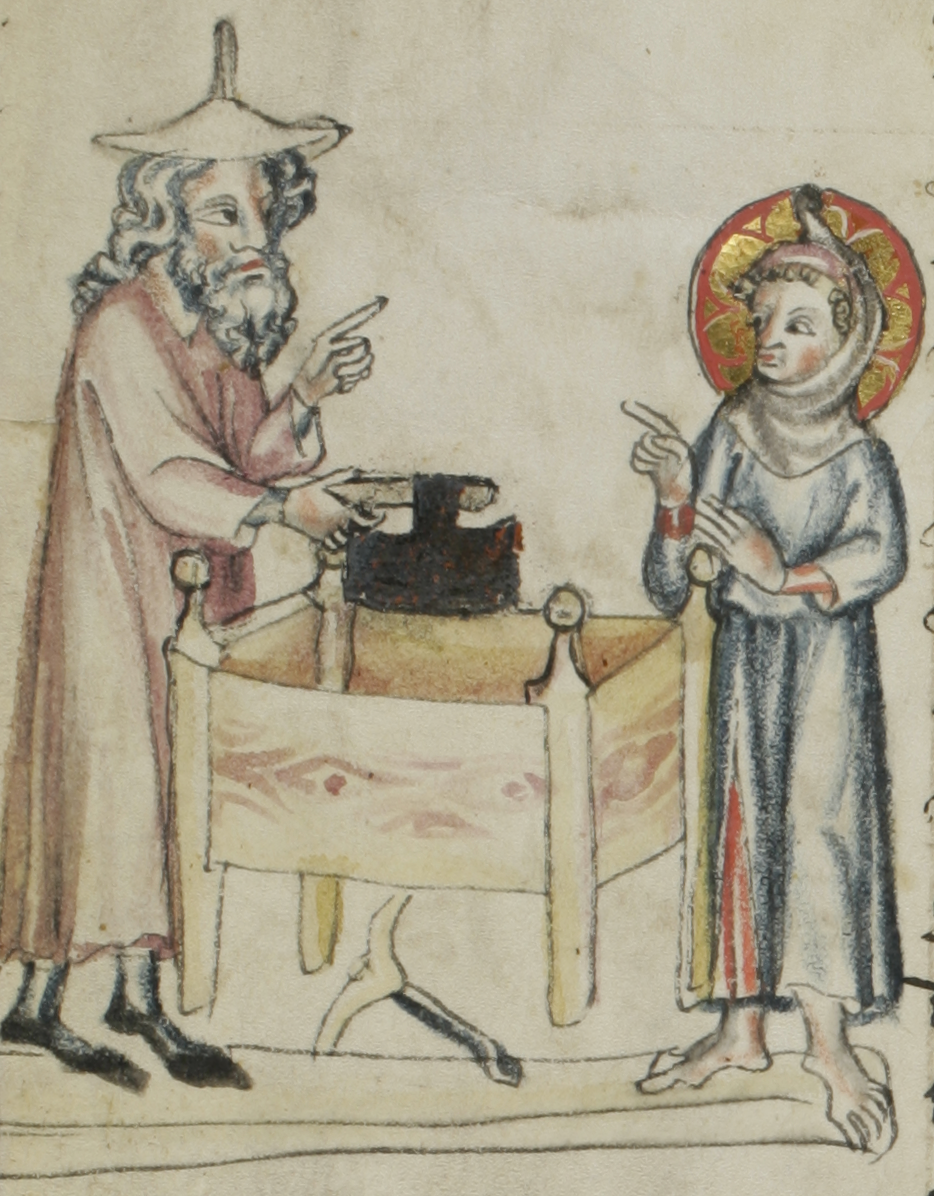
Jesus tells Joseph to raise a dead man, from the German Klosterneuburger Evangelienwerk

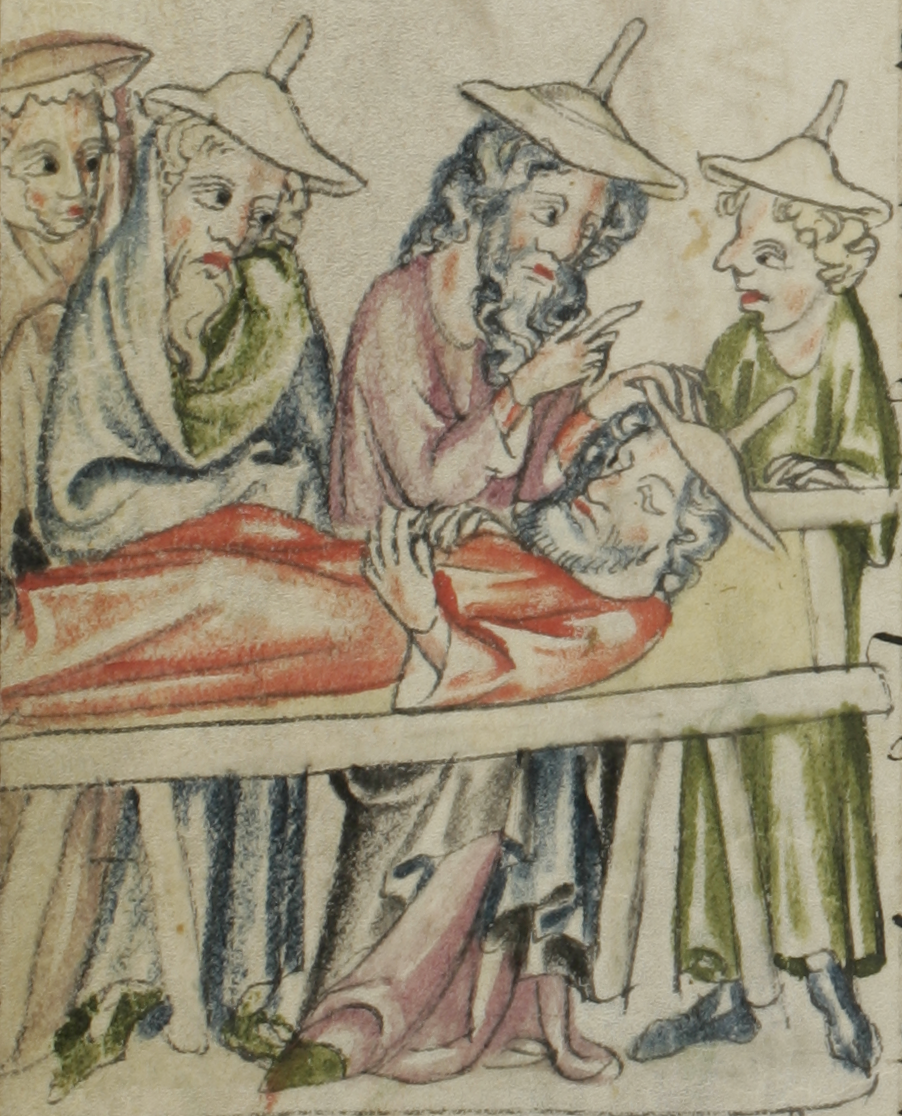
Joseph raises the man on the stretcher from the dead, from the German Klosterneuburger Evangelienwerk.

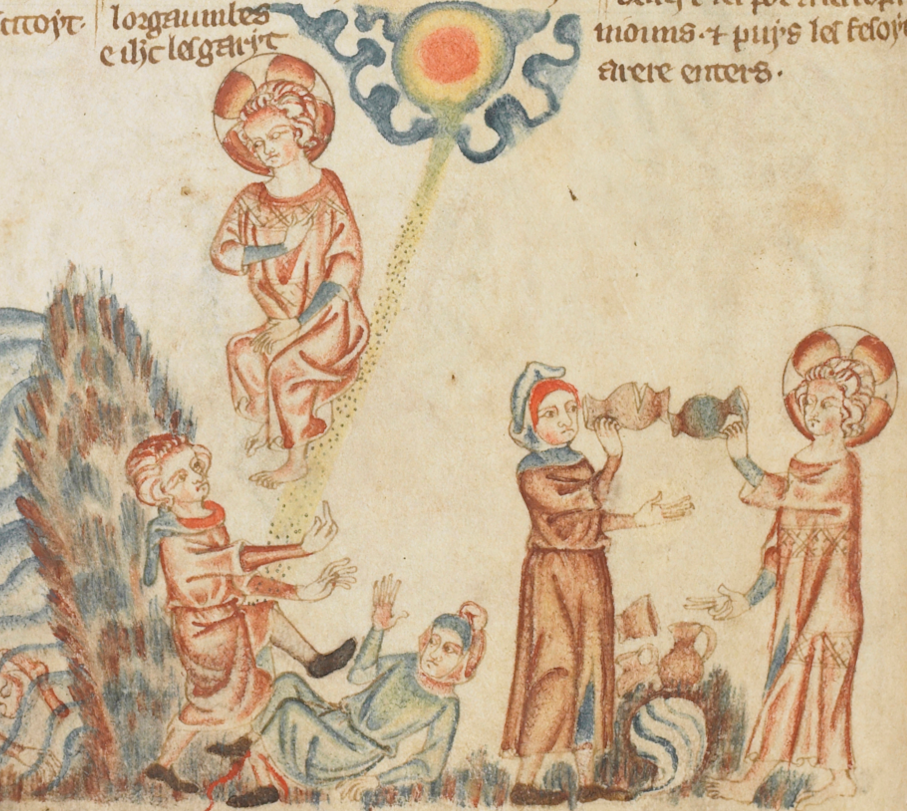
Jesus riding a sunbeam, from the Anglo-Norman Holkham Bible

== Syriac ==
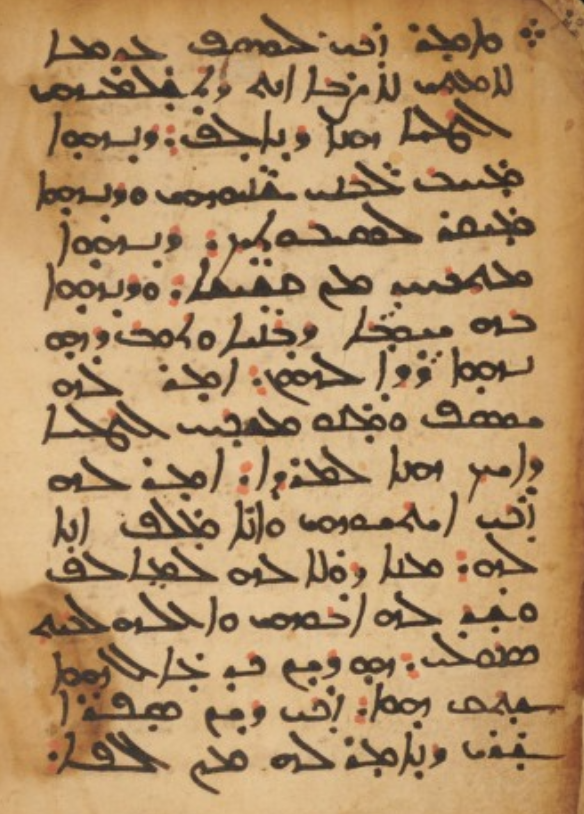
The start of the Childhood of Jesus section in MS 20 from Mar Behnam Monastery, in West Syriac script

When Joseph heard, he ran and came because he was afraid lest that scribe also would die. The scribe said to Joseph, "You have delivered to me not a student but a master." Joseph took Jesus and brought him back to his home.

— Syriac Childhood of Jesus (West Syriac A), 15:3-4

The Syriac version of the work is entitled The Childhood of the Lord Jesus and was one of the earliest translations created – perhaps around the 3rd century. Some scholars even proposed that Syriac might have been the original language of composition, although this hypothesis has largely been discarded since. With the Latin Vienna (LV) version, it is considered an important guide to the very oldest forms of the work, in particular the shorter version. Its oldest manuscripts are also more complete and much less damaged than the Vienna manuscript. The Synoptic-like miracles of chapters 10, 17, and 18 of Greek A are absent. Chapter 6 (Jesus and the first teacher, Zacchaeus) is considerably expanded in this version.

The Syriac versions are generally distinguished between an ancient recension A, West Syriac recension W, and an East Syriac recension E. The A recension includes the two most famous and studied manuscripts.

- British Library Add. 14484, a 6th-century manuscript. It was published by William Wright in 1865.
- Göttingen State and University Library Syr. 10, a 6th century manuscript. It is thought to originate from the famous St. Catherine's Monastery in the Sinai. It also received scholarly attention in the 19th century.
- MBM 20, held by the Mar Behnam Monastery in Mosul, and only brought to wider attention in 2011. While from the 15th or 16th century, it preserves various readings in common with A and against later recensions.
- Syr. 159, held by the Vatican Library, a 17th-century manuscript. Popularized by Paul Peeters, who published a partial translation in 1914.
- Mingana Syr. 105, from the Mingana Collection at the University of Birmingham, an 1832 or 1833 work.
- Mardin, Church of the Forty Martyrs, 101. Parts of the manuscript are from the 15th or 16th century, others from the 19th or 20th century.

The Western Syriac recension is generally found as part of a work, the Life of Mary. Tony Burke further subdivides the recension into three groups, with 17 manuscripts. The Eastern Syriac versions are integrated into a different larger work, the History of the Virgin Mary, and thus include some new stories which may have an origin in Syrian traditions and legends.

Tony Burke proposes that the Arabic translation of the Childhood of Jesus was likely related to the "A" recension, while the Arabic Gospel of the Infancy may have been translated from the East Syriac History of the Virgin given a number of shared stories.

Theologically, the Syriac version is distinctive as it lacks the implicit character arc of Jesus from Greek A, which includes more miracles of healing toward the end. It suggests an early Christian audience who perhaps saw no issue with a cursing Jesus depicted here, akin to the angry Jesus that sometimes appears in the canonical gospels, such as seen in the cursing of the fig tree.

Translations of the Syriac can be found at:

- Burke, Tony (2016). "The Infancy Gospel of Thomas (Syriac): A new translation and introduction". In Burke, Tony; Landau, Brent (eds.). New Testament Apocrypha: More Noncanonical Scriptures. Vol. 1. Eerdmans. ISBN 9780802872890. (A combined translation)
- Burke, Tony (2017). The Syriac Tradition of the Infancy Gospel of Thomas. Gorgias Eastern Christian Studies 48. Gorgias Press. pp. 123–227. ISBN 978-1-4632-0584-3. (3 translations, one for each recension)
- Cowper, Benjamin. H. (1874) [1867]. The Apocryphal Gospels and other documents relating to the History of Christ . Frederic Norgate. pp. 448–456 – via Wikisource.
- Knight, Sarah (2021). Life of the Blessed Virgin Mary. Texts from Christian Late Antiquity 68. Translated by Pallikkapparambil, Kuriyakos. Gorgias Press. pp. 47–52. (the larger West Syriac work Life of Mary; see Book 4 for the Childhood of Jesus material. Kuriyakos did the translation from Syriac to Malayalam; Knight did the translation from Malayalam to English.)
- Budge, E. A. Wallis (1899). The History of the Blessed Virgin Mary and The History of the Likeness of Christ which the Jews of Tiberias Made to Mock at. Luzac's Semitic Texts and Translations 5. Translated by Budge, E. A. Wallis. Luzac & Co. (the East Syriac larger work History of the Virgin)

== Arabic ==
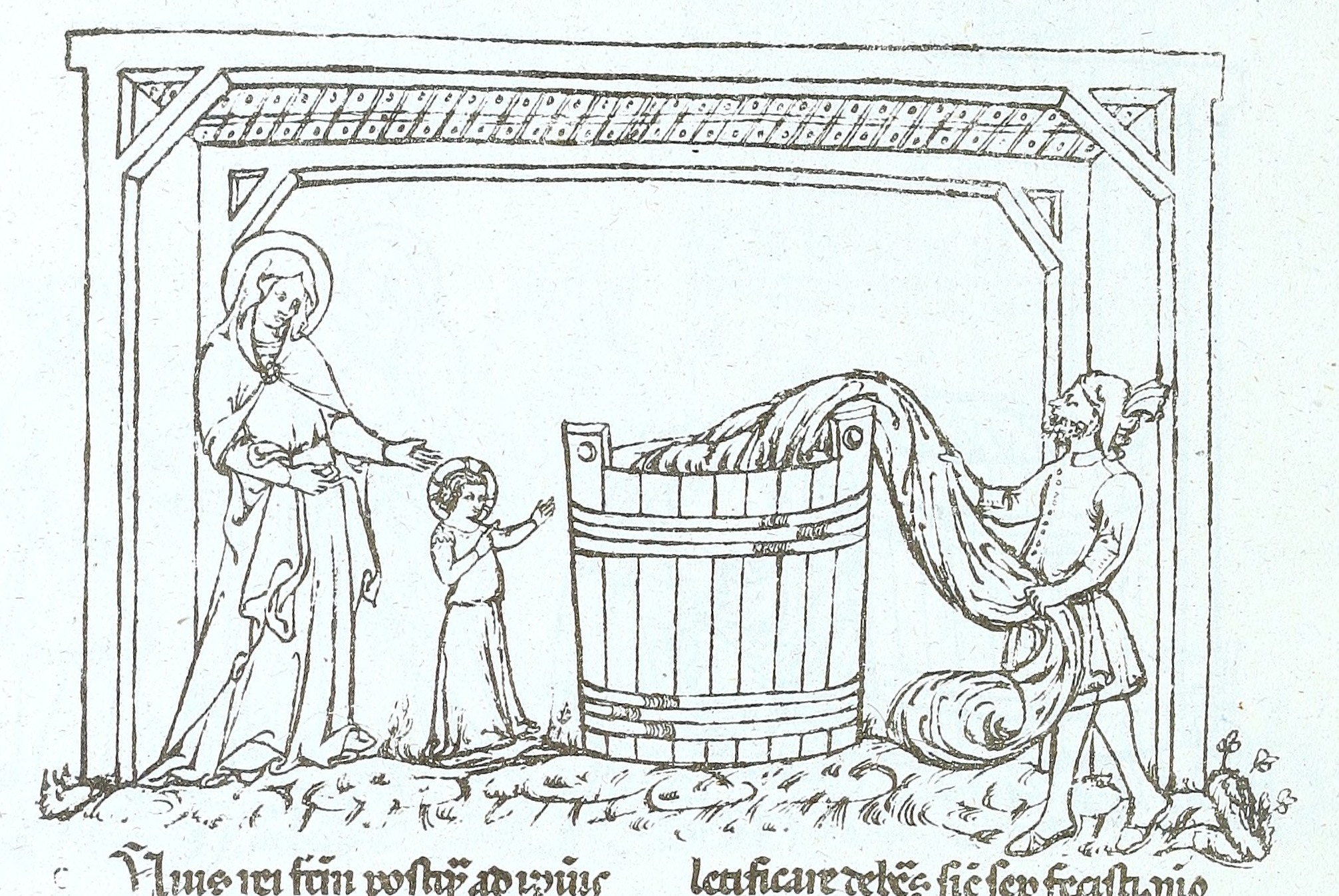
Young Jesus miraculously dyes the mixed clothes orders, to the dyer's shock. Illustration from an edition of Pseudo-Matthew, but the story is in the Arabic version as well.

In the name of God, the Creator, the Living One, the Speaking One, we write here the miracles of Jesus in his childhood. (Note: باسم الله الخالق الحي الناطق نكتب عجايب ايسوع في طفوليته Basm Allah, al-Khāliq, al-Hayy, al-Nāṭiq, naktub ‘Ajā’ib Isū‘ fī ṭufūliyatih)

— Arabic Childhood of Jesus, title

There is only one surviving full manuscript of the Arabic translation of the Childhood of Jesus: MS G 11, held by the Biblioteca Ambrosiana in Milan, 145r–153v. There is also a fragmentary remnant held by the Coptic Museum in Old Cairo, folio 188. G 11 is undated, so it is uncertain when it was made precisely.

The Arabic Gospel of the Infancy is a separate, composite work. It includes some material that originated in the Childhood of Jesus as well as the Syriac History of the Virgin, although these may be "late" additions to the text, given their placement in different sections of different manuscripts. The include a story similar to the animation of sparrows, a story similar to the deadly fall of Zeno (although the boy is now named Buza), a version of Jesus and the Dyer, and Jesus building a throne for the king. Its translation into Arabic appears to most likely be independent from the translation used in MS G 11. Both the Arabic Gospel of the Infancy and the Arabic Childhood of Jesus were likely translated from Syriac. Estimates for when the Arabic Gospel of the Infancy acquired its Childhood of Jesus material range from the 8th century to the 9th century.

The Arabic version says that Joseph died at the age of 117, and says it happened after Jesus was baptized by John and in the same year Jesus called the 12 disciples.

The Arabic translation and Arabic Gospel of the Infancy are examples of cultural memories and traditions that both medieval Christians and medieval Muslims shared. Jesus's miracle of the birds appears in the Islamic Quran as well as Quranic commentary of the era; Muslim writers seem to be familiar with these common traditions. As an example, the story of young Jesus and his teacher is cited by Abu Abd al-Rahman al-Sulami in his Explaining the Meaning of Letters.

A translation of the Arabic version by Slavomír Čéplö can be found at:

- Burke, Tony (2017). The Syriac Tradition of the Infancy Gospel of Thomas. Gorgias Eastern Christian Studies 48. Gorgias Press. pp. 229–243. ISBN 978-1-4632-0584-3. ( available online)

Translations of the Arabic Infancy Gospel can be found at:

- Cowper, Benjamin. H. (1874) [1867]. The Apocryphal Gospels and other documents relating to the History of Christ . Frederic Norgate. pp. 170–216 – via Wikisource.
- Davis, Stephen J. (2014). Christ Child: Cultural Memories of a Young Jesus. Yale University Press. pp. 205–210. ISBN 978-0-300-14945-6. (chapters 36–53, the Childhood of Jesus material)

== Georgian ==
And Jesus began to question the form and name of the first letter (alpha), for it had the names: triangle, successful, revolving, folded-up, gathered, bud-like, many-hued treasure, truly born. (Note: და იწყო იესუ კითხვად ხატი და სახელი პირველისაჲ მის წერილისაჲ, რამეთუ აქუნდა მას სახელებ: სამ-კედლებ, წარმატებულებ, იქცევისებ, ზე-უკუნ კეცილებ, მიმოქცეულებ, კკვრის სახებ, ფერად საფასე, მართლიად შობილ. Da its’q’o iesu k’itkhvad khat’i da sakheli p’irvelisay mis ts’erilisay, rametu akunda mas sakheleb: sam-k’edleb, ts’armat’ebuleb, iktseviseb, ze-uk’un k’etsileb, mimoktseuleb, k’k’vris sakheb, perad sapase, martliad shobil. As a side note, the first Georgian letter Ani (ა) looks nothing like a triangle, so this is clearly maintaining a reference to the Greek Alpha (Α).)

— Georgian Childhood of Jesus 6

The infancy gospel was translated into Old Georgian by the 6th or 7th century, and possibly even earlier given its archaic style of Georgian. Scholars such as Stephen Shoemaker have argued that the version was probably translated from Greek directly, and not from Syriac. However, the Syriac version is likely the best guide to the state of the document the Georgian translator was working from, as no Greek manuscripts of the short version survived. The Georgian version survives in only a single manuscript, Tbilisi A-95, pp. 568–572. A-95 was originally two manuscripts and combined into one large work of 655 folios. The section with the infancy gospel is from the final section of the second part, which was copied around the end of the 10th century at the monastery of Parkhali. It is damaged, with the story of Jesus and Zacchaeus the teacher cut off in the middle (at Greek A 7.2). This was likely an accident rather than intentional, given its placement at the end, and that folios at the beginning and end suffer more wear and tear. The manuscript was published in print in 1918 by Korneli Kekelidze.

A translation of the Georgian can be found at:

- Shoemaker, Stephen J. (2025). "The Georgian Version of the Infancy Gospel of Thomas: Text and Translation". In Cielontko, David; Nicklas, Tobias; Bremmer, Jan N. (eds.). The Infancy Gospel of Thomas. Early Christian Apocrypha 23. Peeters. pp. 169–184. ISBN 978-90-429-5402-1.

== Armenian ==
Israel [the dyer] thought that he was making fun of him. Jesus said: 'Look and see.' And he began to pull out of the same jar bright and beautiful (fabrics), with the (owners’) names. Though Israel saw what Jesus was doing, he called Joseph and Mary and said to them: 'What work is this, which your child did in my house?'

— Armenian Gospel of the Infancy 21:14

The Childhood of Jesus is extant as a section of the Armenian Gospel of the Infancy, a composite work which combines this work with the Gospel of James and other Armenian sources. Some scholars have suggested that the work was translated into Armenian independently first, and then combined with the Armenian Infancy Gospel later, but if so, this hypothesized version has been lost. The oldest extant manuscript of the Armenian Infancy Gospel is from the 13th or 14th century, but the translation is likely much older. A document says that Nestorian missionaries brought a copy of the "Infancy of the Savior" to Armenia around 590, giving an estimate of when stories like this began to circulate there.

Sever Voicu speculated that the Georgian version might have been translated from Armenian (rather than Greek or Syriac), but Stephen Shoemaker has strongly argued against this, saying that "this is not warranted by the current state of the evidence."

A translation of the Armenian Gospel of the Infancy can be found at:

- Terian, Abraham (2008). The Armenian Gospel of the Infancy: With three early versions of the Protevangelium of James. Oxford University Press. pp. 3–149. ISBN 978-0199541560.

== Irish ==
I mbu macán cóic bliadna[e]
Ísu mac Dé bí
Sénais dá huiscén deäc,
Arros-fí de chrí.

When Jesus, son of the Living God,
Was a lad of five years
He blessed twelve little pools of water.
He had enclosed them with clay.

— A Versified Narrative of The Childhood Deeds of the Lord Jesus, Q1

The Irish translation of the Childhood of Jesus was likely created around 700 CE. It survives in a single 17th-century manuscript, G 50, held at the National Library of Ireland in Dublin. Unlike other translations, the work is refashioned to be in verse (that is, as a poem of quatrains). From what can be deduced from other poems in the manuscript that can be tracked better, it does not appear that the poems changed in transmission, suggesting the 17th century manuscript is a good match for a lost 12th century manuscript it was copied from. It is more difficult to hypothesize on transmission before this, but it is thought that any changes were likely also minor from the 8th or 9th century versions to the lost 12th century one. The dating to the early 8th century was proposed by Jay Carney on grounds of the word usage. The poem does not have a title in the manuscript, matching the older versions of the Childhood which also lack a title.

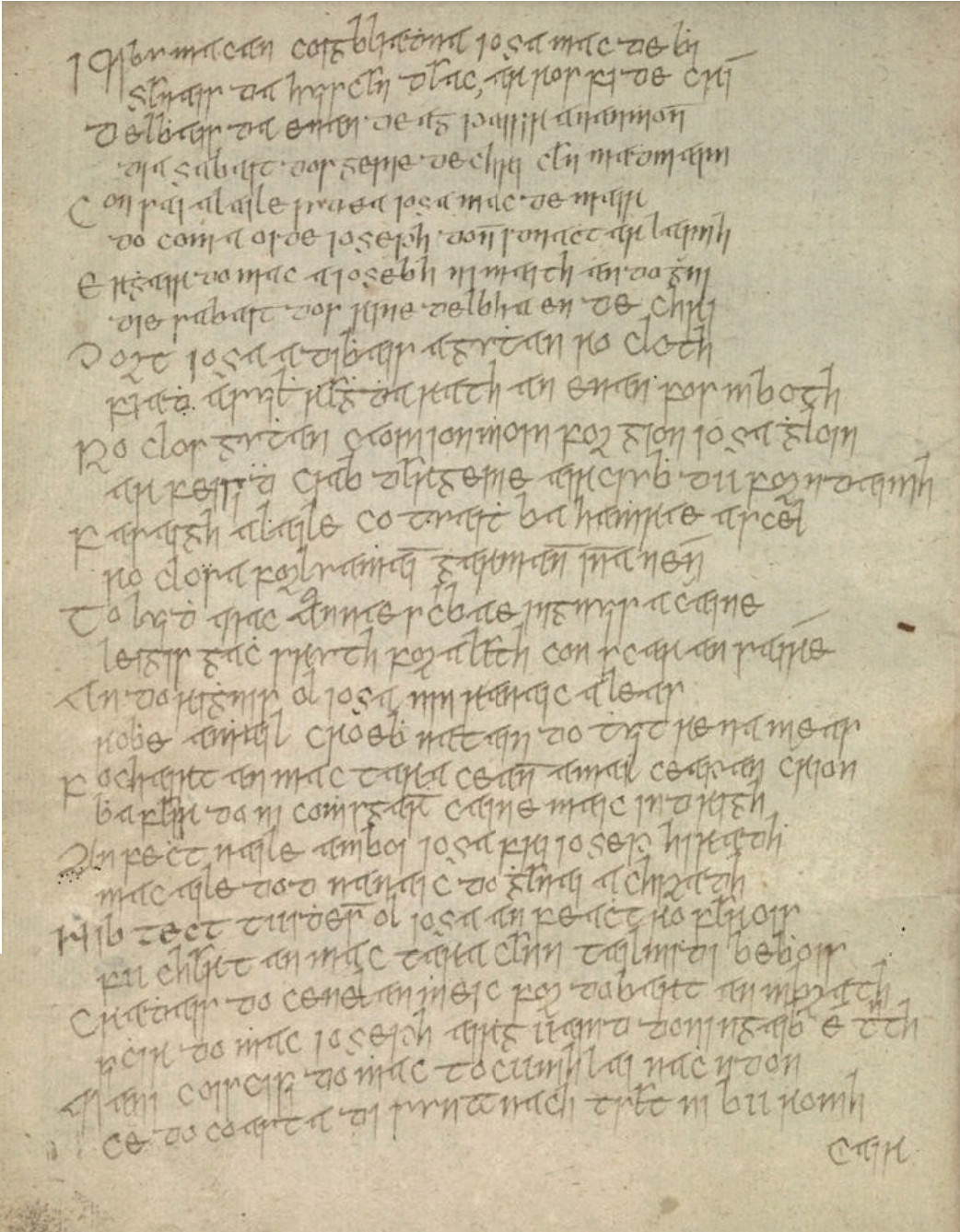
G50, an Irish manuscript containing a versified translation of the Childhood of Jesus

In general, the Irish version "tones down" some of the rougher edges of the oldest versions. Joseph does not pull Jesus's ear, nor rebuke him for some of his deeds; the son of Annas merely falls over "like a withered twig", rather than being withered directly himself.

One theological adjustment is that the Irish version does not refer to Joseph as Jesus's father directly, except when in the tongues of antagonistic Jews, a change from other older versions. Some medieval Western European Christians downplayed Joseph's role of father, so as not to imply contradicting the tenet that God was Jesus's "real" father. The Irish version simply omits two mentions of "father" and changes another to "foster father." It also includes a new line where Jesus bluntly tells his teacher that "You think Joseph is my father. He is not." That said, the text does not take a hostile stance toward Joseph. It somewhat adjusts the story of the woodworking project to make clear that the piece of wood being the wrong size was not Joseph's fault, but someone else's, and it was brought to Joseph for adjustment.

The birds that Jesus creates from clay are called "Passeres", from the Latin passir ("sparrow") rather than translating it to Irish. It seems that the poet might have been aware of multiple traditions; he includes both the master hitting Jesus on the head with his fist (the majority of sources), as well as hitting him with a rod (the Latin LM version). Unlike other versions, the Irish calls the first teacher "Zacharias" (rather than Zacchaeus or Zachyas). This might be due to the influence of the Irish version of the Gospel of James, where the priest Zacharias is a major character.

While the Irish version agrees with Lm by far the most, it does have a phrase where it agrees specifically with Greek A (quatrain 18), and one phrase where it agrees with Lv (quatrain 3). These could be coincidences, though. The Irish version cuts off somewhat abruptly with the story of the wooden craft Joseph assembles. Jesus visiting the Temple is not included.

Tony Burke considers the Irish version an important reference for the first Latin translation (as LV is damaged and unreadable in parts), while Sever Voicu is doubtful, suggesting that the versification was too free and changed too much to say anything for certain about the Irish translator's source.

A translation of the Irish version as well as the original Irish can be found in:

- Herbert, Máire; McNamara, Martin (2001). "A Versified Narrative of the Childhood Deeds of the Lord Jesus". Apocrypha Hiberniae: Evangelia infantiae, Volume 1. Corpus Christianorum Series Apocryphorum 13. Brepols. pp. 456–483. ISBN 9782503410005.

== Ethiopic ==
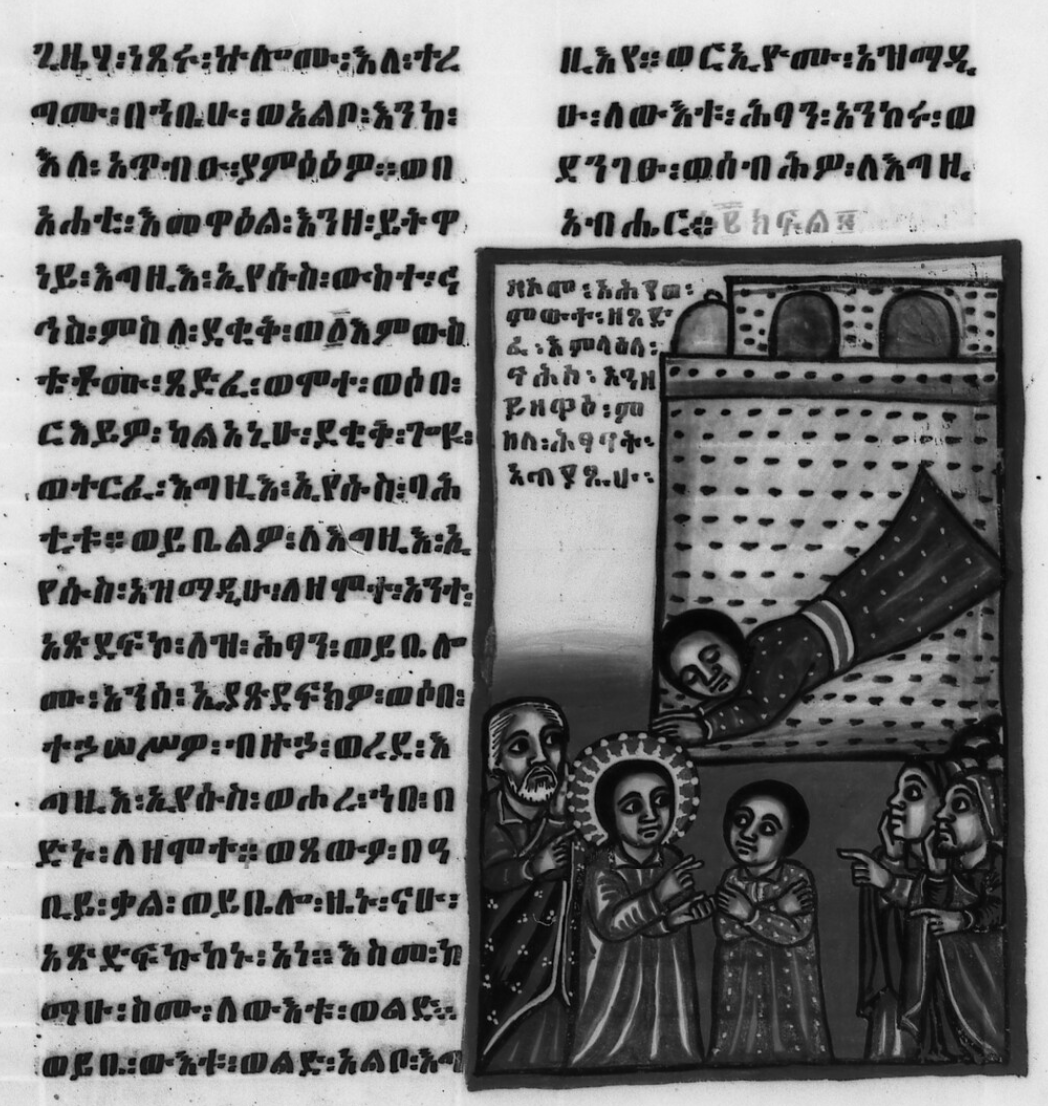
Illustration of Zeno falling to his death, from an 18th-century manuscript of the Ethiopic The Miracles of Jesus

Again, the Lord Jesus did a miracle. When the sun entered through the window, the Lord Jesus rode on the sunbeam and went to the east and west, as far as the sunbeam came.

— The Miracles of Jesus 8.12

An Ethiopic (Ge'ez) translation of the Childhood of Jesus is found in the Ta'amra 'Iyasus ("The Miracles of Jesus"). While most of the text is a translation of the apocryphal Arabic Gospel of John (not to be confused with the canonical Gospel of John), episode 8 contains the Childhood of Jesus. The surviving manuscripts are comparatively recent, largely dating from the seventeenth and eighteenth century, but the translation is believed to be considerably older than that, and clearly a separate work grafted onto the Arabic Gospel of John later. At least 25 manuscripts containing the Childhood of Jesus survive.

The work was translated from the shorter recension seen in the Syriac translation, but when this happened is not clear. Scholars including Stephen Gero and Sever Voicu have suggested it was likely translated from a lost Greek original of the short recension, which would imply at some point before the 7th century. The other possibility is that it came from an Arabic or Syriac version that spread to Ethiopia after the Early Muslim conquests and the Arab conquest of Egypt.

In the story of Jesus and the third teacher, the Ethiopic version omits the idea that the teacher will attempt flattery on Jesus, and more generally mentions flattery nowhere.

A translation of the Ethiopic can be found at:

- Poirier, Paul-Hubert. "Eighth Miracle which our Lord and our Saviour Jesus Christ did when he was a young child". TonyBurke.ca.

== Slavonic ==
Jesus entered the Jewish temple and called many Jewish children, playing with them. He stood high on the wall and ran along the sunbeam, flew through the sun and walked headlong. The Jewish children wanted to follow him, but they could not; they fell on the ground and were broken. And Jesus started to laugh.

— Slavonic Childhood of Jesus 6

The Childhood of Jesus was translated into Church Slavonic from Greek, and the longer recension. It includes the added chapters seen in Greek A that Greek S lacked. It appears to have probably been translated in medieval Bulgaria, most likely around the 10th or 11th centuries. From there, it spread to Serbia, Ukraine, and Russia.

In general, the Slavic literary tradition did not sharply separate canonical and non-canonical works. There were 19th- and 20th-century efforts to banish apocryphal works from the corpus, but these were late and not entirely effective. Slavic Christian religious books were often anthologies and homiletic compilations which combined homilies, hagiographies, theological tracts, legends, and apocryphal stories. Since the Childhood of Jesus was "parasitically" attached to these compilations, it was prone to be abridged, extended, or otherwise changed, leading to variation in Slavonic manuscripts containing the work. It is difficult to know for sure what was thought of the work, as external commentary on the material in Slavonic is scarce. There do exist a few surviving mentions in 14th century manuscripts.

There are 16 known manuscripts. Of them, six represent an older medieval tradition. These include:

- MS J, the oldest, a 14th-century (1337–1355) Middle Bulgarian manuscript held by the Library of the Russian Academy of Sciences in St. Petersburg, 13.3.17, folios 177–183.
- MS N, a mid-14th century Serbian manuscript, Codex 637, folios 108–125. It was destroyed during World War II bombings. A transcription was published in 1876, so it can still be studied.
- MS X, a 14th-century Serbian manuscript held by the State Historical Museum in Moscow, Codex 162, 200v–206r.
- MS C, a 15th-century manuscript in the Croatian Glagolitic script, held by the Croatian Academy of Sciences and Arts in Zagreb.
- MS L, a late 16th century Serbian manuscript held by the National Library of Serbia, 56v–68v.
- MS S, a 16th-century Russian manuscript held by the State Historical Museum in Moscow, folios 52–61.

Ten manuscripts are Ukrainian and date to the 18th century. The texts have differing titles; a few include "The Narration about Christ's Miracles After His Birth", "Miracles of God's Son", and "Tale about the Childhood of Jesus Christ". The manuscripts again differ in details, phrasings, and included stories; none appear to be direct copies of another. It indicates the kind of variation that happens in oral transmission and folktales.

In addition to stories seen in Greek A, some manuscripts in the Slavonic tradition include other related stories. In the medieval tradition, these include Jesus riding a sunbeam; Jesus tearing down and rebuilding a pagan temple; Jesus healing a man's eye; and Jesus transforming children into pigs. In the Ukrainian tradition, a version of Jesus and the Dyer is found, a story also seen elsewhere (e.g. Pseudo-Matthew, Syriac, etc.). One story unique to a Ukrainian manuscript of the work involves Jesus and a blacksmith where Jesus performs miracles in shoeing a horse, likely taking inspiration from Ukrainian folk tales. The stories mentioned in the Ukrainian versions appear in several Ukrainian folklore songs of the 19th century.

A translation of Manuscript G of the Ukrainian tradition can be found at:

- Syroyid, Dariya (2025). "The Infancy Gospel of Thomas in Ukrainian Manuscripts: Peculiarities in Interpretation". In Cielontko, David; Nicklas, Tobias; Bremmer, Jan N. (eds.). The Infancy Gospel of Thomas. Early Christian Apocrypha 23. Peeters. pp. 163–168. ISBN 978-90-429-5402-1.

== Bibliography ==
- Aasgaard, Reidar (2009). The Childhood of Jesus: Decoding the Apocryphal Infancy Gospel of Thomas. Cascade Books. ISBN 978-1-60608-126-6.
- Budge, E. A. Wallis (1899). The History of the Blessed Virgin Mary and The History of the Likeness of Christ which the Jews of Tiberias Made to Mock at. Luzac's Semitic Texts and Translations 5. Translated by Budge, E. A. Wallis. Luzac & Co.
- Burke, Tony (2010). De Infantia Iesu Evangelium Thomae Graecae. Corpus Christianorum Series Apocryphorum 17. Brepols. ISBN 9782503534190.
- Burke, Tony (2017). The Syriac Tradition of the Infancy Gospel of Thomas. Gorgias Eastern Christian Studies 48. Gorgias Press. ISBN 978-1-4632-0584-3.
- Cielontko, David; Nicklas, Tobias; Bremmer, Jan N., eds. (2025). The Infancy Gospel of Thomas. Early Christian Apocrypha 23. Peeters. ISBN 978-90-429-5402-1.
- Davis, Stephen J. (2014). Christ Child: Cultural Memories of a Young Jesus. Yale University Press. ISBN 978-0-300-14945-6.
- Dzon, Mary (2017). The Quest for the Christ Child in the Later Middle Ages. Middle Ages Series. University of Pennsylvania Press. ISBN 978-0812293708.
- Ehrman, Bart; Pleše, Zlatko (2011). The Apocryphal Gospels: Texts and Translations. Oxford University Press. ISBN 978-0-19-973210-4.
- Gero, Stephen (1971). "The Infancy Gospel of Thomas: A Study of the Textual and Literary Problems". Novum Testamentum. 13 (1): 46–80. doi:10.2307/1560167. JSTOR 1560167.
- Hawk, Brandon W. (2019). The Gospel of Pseudo-Matthew and the Nativity of Mary. Westar Tools and Translations 8. Cascade Books. ISBN 978-1-5326-3715-5.
- Hock, Ronald (1995). The Infancy Gospels of James and Thomas. The Scholars Bible 2. Polebridge Press. ISBN 0-944344-47-X.
- Rosén, Thomas (1997). The Slavonic Translation of the Apocryphal Infancy Gospel of Thomas. AUUSSU 39. Almqvist & Wiksell International. ISBN 91-554-3964-0.
- Terian, Abraham (2008). The Armenian Gospel of the Infancy: With three early versions of the Protevangelium of James. Oxford University Press. p. 103. ISBN 978-0199541560.
- Vukovic, Marijana (2022). Survival and Success of an Apocryphal Childhood of Jesus: Reception of the Infancy Gospel of Thomas in the Middle Ages. Studies of the Bible and Its Reception 21. De Gruyter. ISBN 9783110752786.
