= John Kaminiates =

Byzantine priest and historian

- Ἰωάννης Καμινιάτης
- Born: 9th century
- Died: 10th century
- Citizenship: Eastern Roman Empire
- Occupations: Priest; historian; writer
- Notable work: On the capture of Thessalonica (Εἰς τὴν ἅλωσιν τῆς Θεσσαλονίκης)
- Title: Kouboukleisios

John Kaminiates (Greek: Ἰωάννης Καμινιάτης, fl. tenth century) was a Greek resident of Thessalonica when the city, then one of the largest in the Byzantine Empire, was besieged and sacked by a Saracen force led by Leo of Tripoli in 904. His account of the city's plunder, On the capture of Thessalonica (Εἰς τὴν ἅλωσιν τῆς Θεσσαλονίκης, Eis tēn alōsin tēs Thessalonikēs), survives in four manuscripts; though of these, none were written before the fourteenth century, causing some concern over the text's authenticity.

== Name ==
John Kaminiates has alternatively been transliterated John Kaminatos, Ioannis Kaminiatis, and sometimes appears in the Latinized forms Ioannis Caminiatae, Joannes Cameniata and John Cameniates.

== Life ==
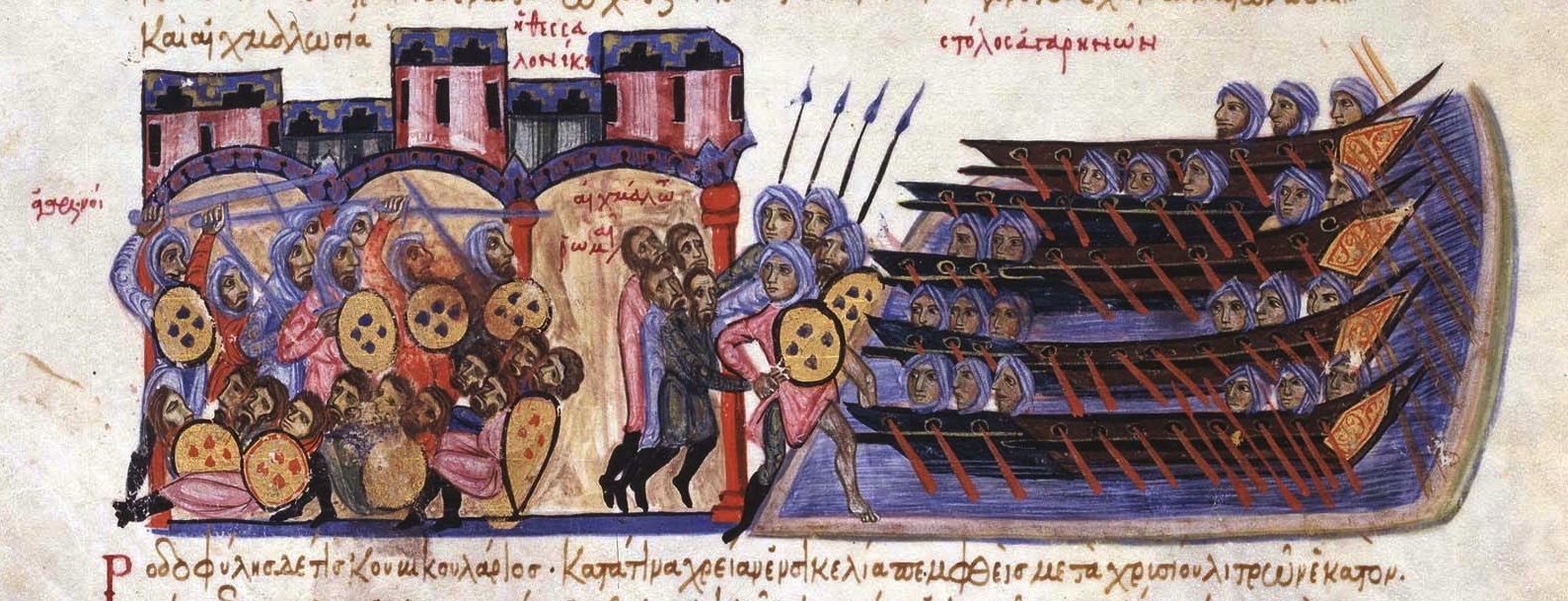
The sack of Thessalonica in 904, from the Madrid Skylitzes.

Kaminiates was born in the end of the 9th century in the Byzantine Empire and was the son of an exarch. He grew up to become a priest of the imperial palace at Thessalonica, holding the ecclesiastical dignity of kouboukleisios. During the sack of Thessalonica by the Abbasid Caliphate in 904, Kaminiates and his family were among the Thessalonians that were captured by the intruders.

== On the capture of Thessalonica ==
On the capture of Thessalonica (Greek: Εἰς τὴν ἅλωσιν τῆς Θεσσαλονίκης) takes the form of a long letter written by Kaminiates to his friend, Gregory of Cappadocia; and describes the sack of Thessalonica and the treatment of the captives. He gives a very detailed description of the attack and his experience on the pirate ship, which was initially heading to Crete and then to Paphos, Tripoli and Tarsus in Cilicia. His work is an invaluable source about the sack of Thessalonica in 904, as well as the slave trade in the eastern Mediterranean during the medieval times.

However, its validity is questioned by some modern historians mainly due to some anachronisms that appear in Kaminiates' work. Alexander Kazhdan argued that the text was a 15th-century composition masquerading as a 10th-century text, written in response to the siege of Thessalonica in 1430 by the Ottoman Empire. Other scholars like Ioannis Tsaras, David Frendo and Paolo Odorico support that the extant text is a reworked or modified version of a 10th-century original.

== Sources ==
English

- Kaminiates, John The capture of Thessaloniki (D. Frendo, A. Fotiou, and G.Böhlig, trans.) Byzantina Australiensia, 12. Perth: Australian Association for Byzantine Studies, 2000. ISBN 1-876503-00-9.
- Kazhdan, Alexander Some Questions Addressed to the Scholars, who Believe in the Authenticity of Kaminiates’ Capture of Thessalonika Byzantinische Zeitschrift 71. 1978. p. 301–314. ISSN 0007-7704.
- Tougher, Shaun (1997). The Reign of Leo VI (886-912): Politics and People. Leiden; New York; Köln: Brill. ISBN 9004108114.

Foreign

- Kaminiates, John Eis ten alosin tes Thessalonikes / De Expugnatione Thessalonicae (Böhlig, Gertrude, ed.) Corpus Fontium Historiae Byzantinae. Berlin: De Gruyter, 1973. ISSN 0589-8048
