= Eustathios Argyros =

Eustathios Argyros (Greek: Εὐστάθιος Ἀργυρός) can refer to:

- Eustathios Argyros (admiral under Leo VI)
- Eustathios Argyros (general under Leo VI)
