= Himerios (admiral) =

- Native name: Ιμέριος
- Died: 912/913 Constantinople
- Allegiance: Byzantine Empire
- Service years: 904–912
- Rank: Admiral

Himerios (Greek: Ὶμέριος), also Himerius, was a Byzantine administrator and admiral of the early 10th century, best known as the commander of the Byzantine navy during its struggles with the resurgent Muslim navies in from 900 to 912.

== Biography ==
Nothing is known about Himerios's early life. He was married to the sister of Zoe Karbonopsina, the mistress and later wife of Emperor Leo VI the Wise (r. 886–912), and his career was the direct result of this relationship.

Initially a protasēkrētis, Himerios was given command of the Byzantine fleet in 904. A Muslim fleet under Leo of Tripoli was heading towards Constantinople and had already driven back the Byzantines under the Droungarios of the Fleet Eustathios Argyros. Eustathios was replaced by Himerios, who, however, did not have to fight, as the Arabs withdrew on their own. The two fleets encountered each other off Thasos, but the Byzantines chose not to give battle. As a result, the Arabs were able to besiege and sack Thessalonica, the Byzantine Empire's second-largest city, and sail home unopposed.

On St. Thomas's day (6 October) in 906, Himerios scored his first victory over the Arabs, and it was probably then that he was awarded the high state office of logothetēs tou dromou (effectively foreign minister). Another victory followed in 909, and in the next year, he led an expedition on the Syrian coast: Laodicea was sacked, its hinterland plundered, and many prisoners captured, with minimal losses. At the same time, Himerios also landed on Cyprus, which for centuries had been demilitarized as a condominium with the caliphate. The recovery of the island was temporary only, as in 911 or 912, Damian of Tarsus assaulted Cyprus. Eventually, the previous status quo was restored.

In the autumn of 911, Himerios had set out on a new attempt to retake Crete. He commanded a fleet of 177 dromons with 43,000 men, and set the island's capital, Chandax, under siege. The siege had lasted for six months, when news arrived from Constantinople that the Emperor was ill and dying. Consequently, Himerios abandoned the fruitless siege and set sail for the capital. However, as his fleet was rounding Chios, they fell into a Saracen ambush set by Leo of Tripoli and Damian of Tarsus (April 912). The Byzantines were annihilated, and Himerios himself narrowly escaped. Following this defeat and the death of Emperor Leo, he was dismissed by the new emperor, Alexander (r. 912–913), and exiled to the monastery of Kamba, where he died six months later.

== Sources ==
- Kazhdan, Alexander Petrovich, ed. (1991). Oxford Dictionary of Byzantium. New York, New York and Oxford, United Kingdom: Oxford University Press. ISBN 978-0-19-504652-6.
- Tougher, Shaun (1997). The Reign of Leo VI (886-912): Politics and People. Leiden; New York; Köln: Brill. ISBN 9004108114.
