= Leo of Tripoli =

10th-century Greek-born naval officer of the Abbasid Caliphate

- Lāwī Abū'l-Ḥāriṭ, Rashīq al-Wardāmī
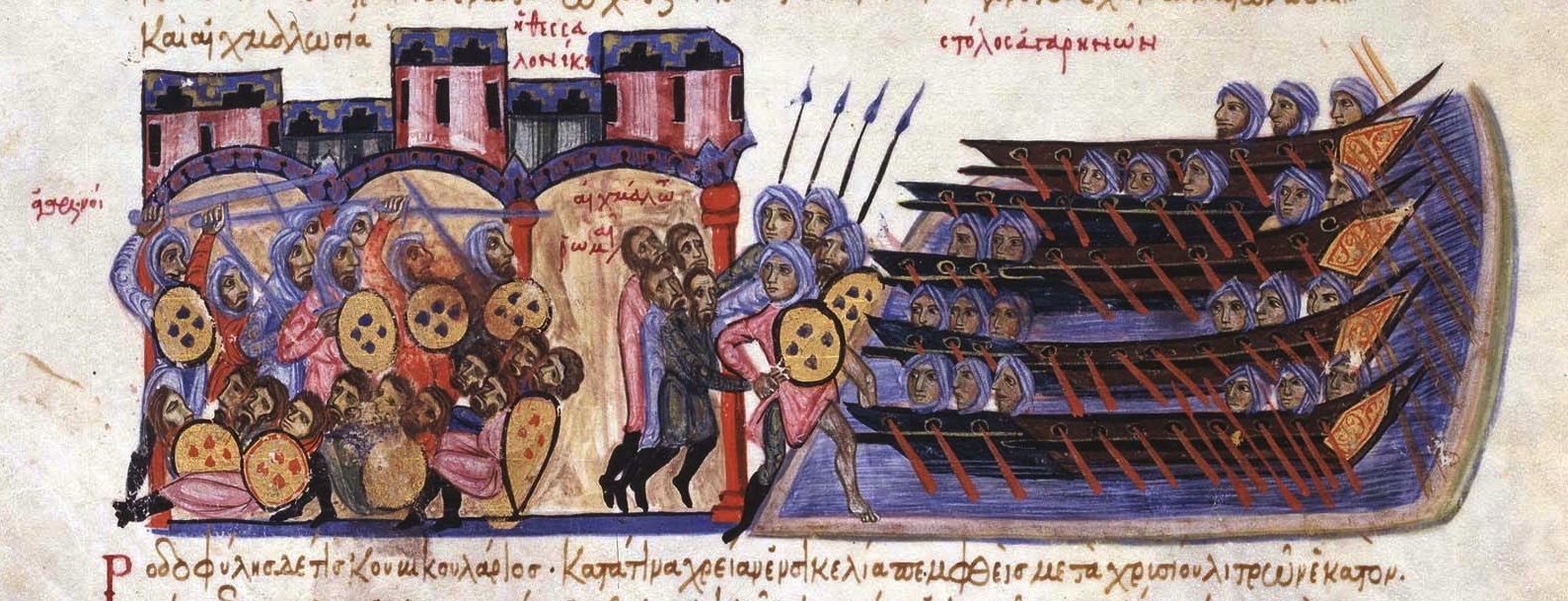
- The sack of Thessalonica in 904, from the Madrid Skylitzes
- Born: Leo; Attaleia (modern-day Antalya, Turkey)
- Died: after 921/2
- Military career
- Allegiance: Abbasid Caliphate
- Branch: Abbasid army
- Service years: before 904 – after 921/2
- Nicknames: ghulām Zurāfa, Rashīq al-Wardāmī
- Commands: Admiral, Governor of Tripoli, Deputy governor of Tarsus
- Wars: Arab–Byzantine wars: Sack of Thessalonica

Leo of Tripoli (Greek: Λέων ὸ Τριπολίτης), known in Arabic as Rashīq al-Wardāmī (رشيق الوردامي), and Ghulām Zurāfa (غلام زرافة), was a Greek renegade and fleet commander for the Abbasid Caliphate in the early tenth century. He is most notable for his sack of Thessalonica, the Byzantine Empire's second city, in 904.

== Life ==
Nothing is known of Leo's early life except that he was born in or near Attaleia, the capital of the maritime Cibyrrhaeot Theme, and was captured in an Arab raid and brought to Tripoli. In captivity, he converted to Islam, and entered the service of his captors as a seaman and commander. In Arabic sources he is called Lāwī Abū'l-Ḥārith and given the sobriquet ghulām Zurāfa, "servant/page of Zurafa", probably reflecting the name of his first Muslim master. He is also referred to as Rashīq al-Wardāmī. Alexander Vasiliev interpreted the element Wardāmī in his second Arabic name to mean that Leo was a Mardaite.

The details of Leo's early career in the Muslim fleets are unknown, but he seems to have risen quickly: the historian Mas'udi, who met him in person, regarded him as one of the best navigators of his time. In the Arabic sources, he appears with the generic titles of commander (qā’id) or admiral (amīr al-baḥr), as well as governor (ṣāḥib) of Tripoli, and deputy governor (nā’ib) of Tarsus. Both of the latter cities were major Muslim naval centres in the late 9th century, and due to their proximity to the Byzantine Empire functioned as staging areas for the Muslim naval raids.

In early 904, along with another Greek renegade, Damian of Tarsus, Leo participated in the Abbasid campaign that wrested Egypt from the Tulunids and restored it to Abbasid control. Leo and Damian would frequently co-operate in the next decade in their attacks on the Byzantine Empire. In the summer of 904, Leo was at the head of a major Abbasid naval expedition of 54 vessels from the Syrian and Egyptian fleets, whose initial target reportedly was Constantinople itself. The Arab fleet penetrated the Dardanelles and sacked Abydos, as the Byzantine navy under the droungarios Eustathios Argyros was reluctant to confront them. Emperor Leo VI the Wise replaced Argyros with the more energetic Himerios, but Leo of Tripoli forestalled the Byzantines, turning back west and heading for the Empire's second city, Thessalonica, which he sacked after a three-day siege on 31 July 904. The sack of the city brought the Muslim fleet enormous booty and many captives who were taken to be sold as slaves, including the eyewitness John Kaminiates, who wrote the main account of the city's siege and fall. Arab sources, confusing Thessalonica with Attaleia, erroneously report that Leo sacked the latter city.

It is unknown if Leo was the head of the Arab fleet defeated by Himerios on St. Thomas' Day (6 October, probably in 906), but along with Damian of Tarsus he was in command of the Arab fleet that scored a major victory over Himerios in April 912 off Chios, while he was returning from a fruitless attempt to reconquer the Emirate of Crete. Finally, in 921/2, the imperial navy under the patrikios and droungarios John Rhadenos defeated Leo's fleet off Lemnos. Most of the Arab fleet was destroyed and Leo himself barely escaped. He disappears from the sources after this event.

== See also ==
- Tulunids in Lebanon

== Sources ==
- Kazhdan, Alexander (1991). "Leo of Tripoli". In Kazhdan, Alexander (ed.). The Oxford Dictionary of Byzantium. Oxford and New York: Oxford University Press. p. 1216. ISBN 0-19-504652-8.
- Khoury Odetallah, Rashad (1995). "Leo Tripolites – Ghulām Zurāfa and the Sack of Thessaloniki in 904". Byzantinoslavica. 56 (1): 97–102. ISSN 0007-7712.
- Lilie, Ralph-Johannes; Ludwig, Claudia; Pratsch, Thomas; Zielke, Beate (2013). Prosopographie der mittelbyzantinischen Zeit Online. Berlin-Brandenburgische Akademie der Wissenschaften. Nach Vorarbeiten F. Winkelmanns erstellt (in German). Berlin and Boston: De Gruyter.
- Rosenthal, Franz, ed. (1985). The History of al-Ṭabarī, Volume XXXVIII: The Return of the Caliphate to Baghdad: The Caliphates of al-Muʿtaḍid, al-Muktafī and al-Muqtadir, A.D. 892–915/A.H. 279–302. SUNY Series in Near Eastern Studies. Albany, New York: State University of New York Press. ISBN 978-0-87395-876-9.
- Tougher, Shaun (1997). The Reign of Leo VI (886–912): Politics and People. Leiden: Brill. ISBN 978-90-04-10811-0.
- Vasiliev, A. A. (1968). Byzance et les Arabes, Tome II, 1ére partie: Les relations politiques de Byzance et des Arabes à L'époque de la dynastie macédonienne (867–959) (in French). French ed.: Henri Grégoire, Marius Canard. Brussels: Éditions de l'Institut de Philologie et d'Histoire Orientales.
- Wortley, John, ed. (2010). John Skylitzes: A Synopsis of Byzantine History, 811–1057. Cambridge: Cambridge University Press. ISBN 978-0-521-76705-7.
