= Eustathios Argyros (admiral under Leo VI) =

Eustathios Argyros (Greek: Εύστάθιος Άργυρός) was a Byzantine admiral under Emperor Leo VI the Wise (r. 886–912).

== Life ==
Eustathios Argyros first appears during the outbreak of the war with Bulgaria in 894, under the overall command of Nikephoros Phokas the Elder. At the time, he was already patrikios and commander of the imperial fleet (droungarios tou ploimou), and he was sent to the Danube to ferry across the allied Magyars and put pressure on Bulgaria from the rear; the strategy worked, and Tsar Simeon asked for peace. As soon as the Byzantines withdrew for negotiations to take place, however, Simeon drove back the Magyars and renewed war with Byzantium.

In 902, Emperor Leo VI the Wise had sent a fleet under Eustathios to aid Taormina in Sicily, which was being threatened by the Arabs. The city fell on 1 August 902, and on his return to Constantinople, Eustathios and the city's garrison commander, Constantine Karamallos, were accused by commander Michael Charaktos of extreme negligence and even treason. Both faced execution, but were saved by the intervention of Patriarch Nicholas Mystikos. Eustathios was confined to the Monastery of Stoudios. The nature of Eustathios' "treason" is unclear from the sources, and the whole episode is complicated by the fact that no source explicitly mentions his presence in Sicily or southern Italy. Modern scholars assume that the fleet's departure was fatally delayed, perhaps, as Theophanes Continuatus claims, because the emperor himself employed its sailors in church construction.

In any case, Eustathios' failure cannot have been very severe, because only two years later, in 904, he re-appears as commander of the fleet. He was again entrusted with confronting the Saracen fleet of Leo of Tripoli, but hesitated to engage him in battle, and even allowed the Saracens to enter the Hellespont, within striking distance of the Byzantine capital. Leo replaced him with Himerios, but he too was unable to effectively oppose the Saracens, who went on to sack the Empire's second city, Thessalonica.

== Identity ==
Some modern scholars like Romilly James Heald Jenkins (The 'Flight' of Samonas), R. H. Dolley (The Lord High Admiral Eustathios Argyros and the betrayal of Taormina to the African Arabs in 902) and Ekkehard Eickhoff (Seekrieg und Seepolitik zwischen Islam und Abendland) consider the admiral Eustathios to have been identical to the contemporary general Eustathios Argyros, mainly due to the reference by the 11th-century historian John Skylitzes that the latter pursued a career in the army as well as in the fleet. This identification is rejected by other scholars like J.-F. Vannier (Familles byzantines: les Argyroi (IXe–XIIe siècles)) and R. Guilland (Recherches sur les institutions byzantines). Furthermore, the admiral is given the surname "Argyros" even in some modern works that distinguish him from the general, while others reject the surname entirely. According to the Prosopographie der mittelbyzantinischen Zeit, "a definitive decision can no longer be made", and the main argument for the two being different persons is the incompatibility of their careers: like the admiral, Eustathios Argyros experienced a tumultuous career with disgrace and rehabilitation after 904, which would scarcely be possible if he had been twice demoted already.

== Sources ==
- Guilland, Rodolphe (1967). Recherches sur les institutions byzantines [Studies on the Byzantine Institutions]. Berliner byzantinische Arbeiten 35 (in French). Vol. I. Berlin and Amsterdam: Akademie-Verlag & Adolf M. Hakkert. OCLC 878894516.
- Lilie, Ralph-Johannes; Ludwig, Claudia; Pratsch, Thomas; Zielke, Beate (2013). Prosopographie der mittelbyzantinischen Zeit Online. Berlin-Brandenburgische Akademie der Wissenschaften. Nach Vorarbeiten F. Winkelmanns erstellt (in German). Berlin and Boston: De Gruyter.
- Tougher, Shaun (1997). The Reign of Leo VI (886-912): Politics and People. Leiden: Brill. ISBN 978-9-00-410811-0.
