= Stephen J. Shoemaker =

American scholar

Stephen J. Shoemaker is an American scholar, specialising in ancient and early medieval Christianity and early Islam. He serves as a professor of religious studies at the University of Oregon. His work has focused on early devotion to the Virgin Mary, Christian Apocrypha and formative Islam and its relationship with Near Eastern Christianity. Shoemaker received his Ph.D. from Duke University in religious studies.

== Bibliography ==
- The Ancient Traditions of the Virgin Mary’s Dormition and Assumption (Oxford University Press, 2002)
- The Death of a Prophet: The End of Muhammad’s Life and the Beginnings of Islam (University of Pennsylvania Press, 2011)
- Mary in Early Christian Faith and Devotion (Yale University Press, 2016)
- The Apocalypse of Empire: Imperial Eschatology in Late Antiquity and Early Islam (University of Pennsylvania Press, 2018)
- The Dormition and Assumption Apocrypha (Peeters Publishers, 2018)
- A Prophet Has Appeared: The Rise of Islam through Christian and Jewish Eyes (University of California Press, 2021)
- Creating the Qur’an: A Historical-Critical Study (University of California Press, 2022)

== External websites ==
- Personal Website Stephen J. Shoemaker
