= Kouboukleisios =

Koubukleisios (Greek: κουβουκλείσιος) was a title conferred by the Byzantine emperors on ecclesiastic chamberlains, especially those of the Patriarch of Constantinople.

The title is first attested in the Second Council of Nicaea in 787, and recorded in written sources and seals of its holders until the late 11th century, when it was probably abolished. The kouboukleisioi were an ecclesiastic analogue to the emperors' own chamber servants, the koubikoularioi, and the title was conferred by the emperors, although in the 11th century the powerful Patriarch Michael Keroularios assumed this prerogative for himself.

According to the Taktikon Benešević of ca. 934/944, there were two groups of kouboukleisioi, priests and deacons. The post was often combined with other offices in the ecclesiastical administration such as chartophylax or skeuophylax, but could also be held by monks.

== Sources ==
- Kazhdan, Alexander (1991). "Kouboukleisios". In Kazhdan, Alexander (ed.). The Oxford Dictionary of Byzantium. New York and Oxford: Oxford University Press. p. 1155. ISBN 978-0-19-504652-6.
