= Cities in the Byzantine Empire =

In the Byzantine Empire, cities were centers of economic and cultural life. A significant part of the cities (there were more than 900 of them by the 6th century) were founded during Greek and Roman antiquity. The largest of them were Constantinople, Alexandria, Thessaloniki and Antioch, with a population of several hundred thousand people. Large provincial centers had a population of up to 50,000. Although the spread of Christianity negatively affected urban institutions, in general, late antique cities continued to develop continuously. Byzantium remained an empire of cities, although the urban space had changed a lot. If the Greco-Roman city was a place of pagan worship and sports events, theatrical performances and chariot races, the residence of officials and judges, then the Byzantine city was primarily a religious center.

== Historical development ==
=== From ancient city to early Byzantine ===
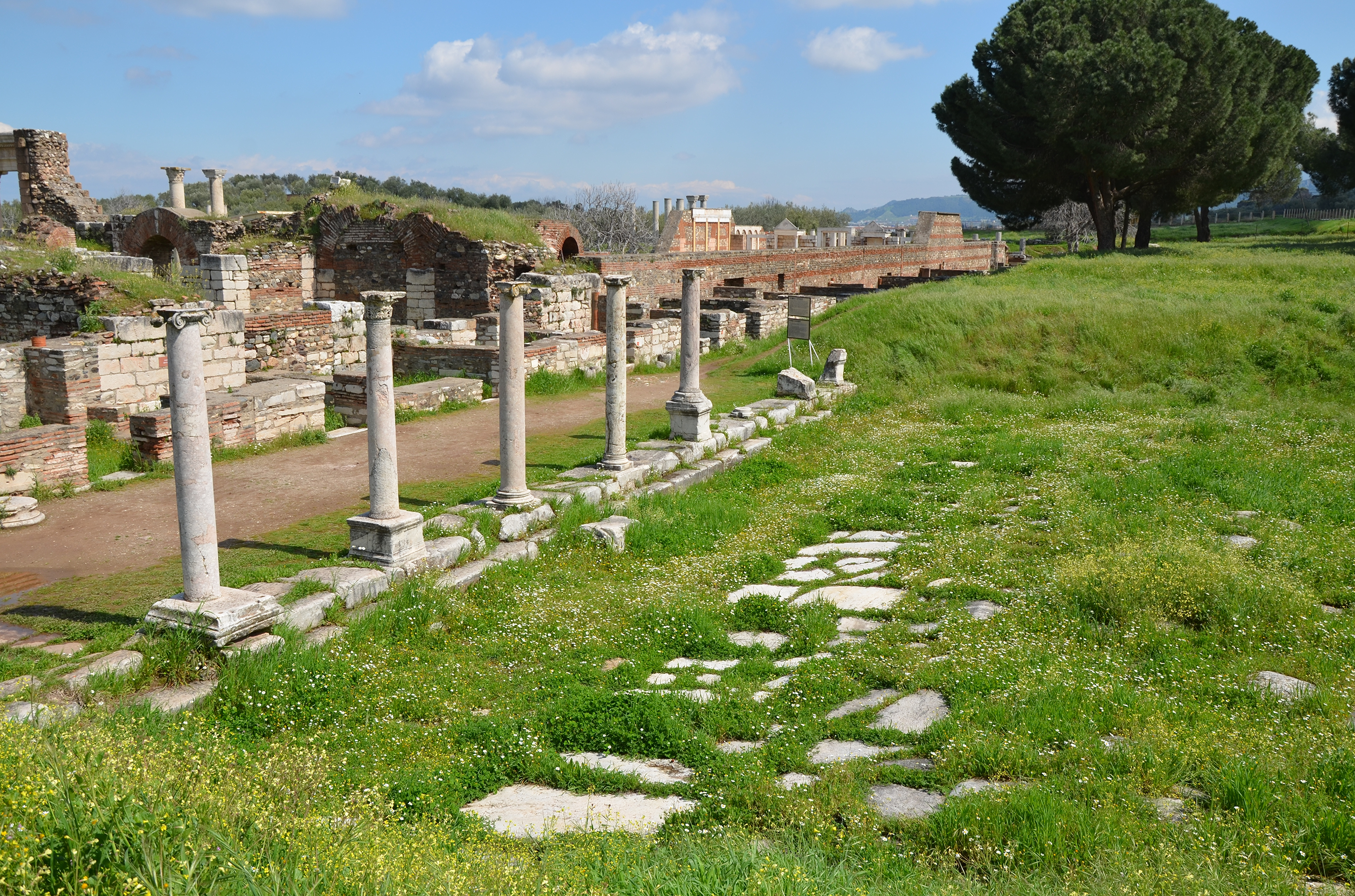
Main street paved with marble blocks in Sardis (Lydia), Turkey.

The first period of Byzantine history, "Proto-Byzantine" in the words of Paul Lemerle, is usually placed between the 4th and the middle of the 7th century. It is considered to be transitional, and its main characteristics can be described in the late antique socio-cultural paradigm, which was based on a polis with its inherent features. The French historian Évelyne Patlagean emphasizes the contrast between the internal stagnation of urban life and the external prosperity of the polis. However, within the vast territory of the Roman and Byzantine empires, development took place in different ways, and, for example, in Anatolia, during more than 550 years of Roman rule, the process of ruralization took place.

For the first period, several fairly general trends were identified that determined the appearance of the city. First, after more than a century and a half, the construction of city walls resumed at the end of the 5th century. The previous fortification program, which began under Emperor Valerian I in the middle of the 3rd century in response to the invasions of the Goths and Heruli, ended around 330. As a rule, the early Byzantine walls of the cities of Asia Minor and the Balkans date from the reign of the emperors Anastasius I (491–518) and Justinian I (527–565), however, the absence of a real military threat in those years makes the dating unreliable. In modern works, it is suggested that the walls of a number of Asia Minor cities could have been created during the era of Theodosius dynasty (379–450), when the empire was threatened by the Goths and Huns. The Theodosian walls were impressive structures that surrounded almost entirely residential areas and were equipped with representative gates. According to one point of view, the walls marked the core of the city and served as a symbol of its status. On the contrary, the perimeter of the walls built under Justinian and his successors, as a rule, did not allow to protect the entire city. (Note: Procopius of Caesarea explains the narrowing of the city walls of Antioch as follows: "since ancient times it had an excessively huge circle of walls, containing in itself a lot of unnecessary spaces, in some places surrounding whole valleys without any sense, in others – tops of cliffs. As a result, the city was exposed to many malicious intent. ".) In favor of short walls, a choice was made in the new fortresses erected after the conquest of North Africa. The small size of the inner city did not necessarily indicate a population decline, since most of the population lived outside of it.
