= Death in the Byzantine Empire =

Byzantine concepts and rituals related to death

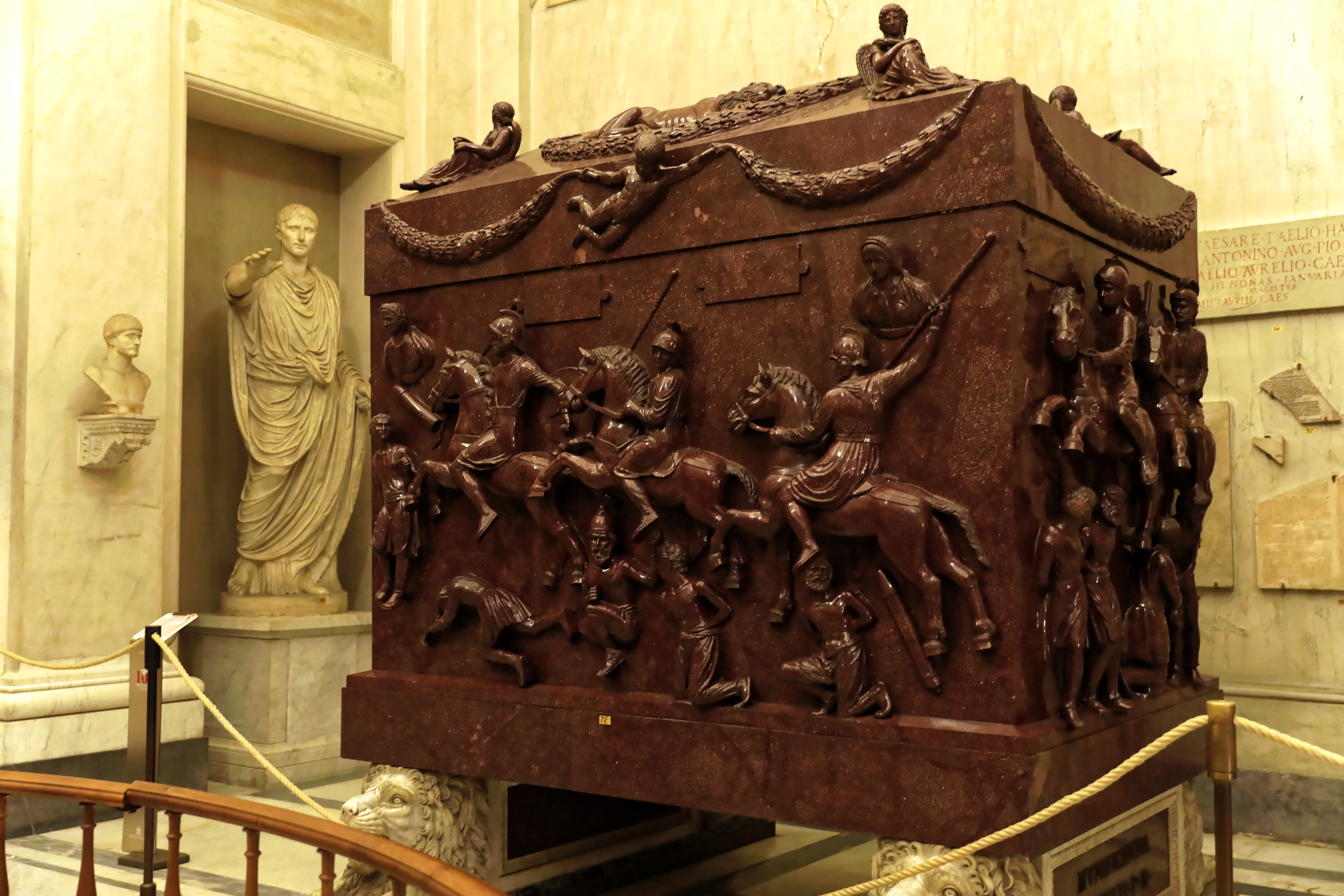
Sarcophagus of St. Helen, 4th century, Museo Pio-Clementino

In the Byzantine Empire, death was generally not mentioned directly, preferring to use various euphemisms such as separation, leaving-by, paying off debts-paying. Byzantine thanatological conceptions go back to ancient philosophy, which presented death as the separation of the soul from the body. According to Christian eschatology, it was assumed that this separation was temporary and that the soul would be reunited with the body at the end of time. The Byzantines believed that death occurred at the command of God, who sent an angel to carry out his will. There were differing opinions as to whether the hour of death was predetermined, but it was believed that only the saints could know it in advance. The afterlife began with the naked and helpless soul coming out of the body through the mouth to be accompanied by an angel to begin a forty-day wandering, passing through publicans, during which the demons weigh its sins. At the end of the journey, the soul sees Hell and Heaven as a possible waiting place for the Last Judgment. The doctrine of the souls transmigration was completely denied in Byzantium. As in the philosophy of Neoplatonism, Eastern Christianity views death as a release for new life, and the Church Fathers Basil the Great and John Chrysostom disapproved of excessive mourning for the dead.

Byzantine death, burial rituals and ideas about the afterlife are largely based on pre-Christian ideas and customs. The pagan belief in a journey of the soul before death, for which some material aids and an attendant —the psychopomp— are necessary, underwent an outward transformation among early Christian theologians. The role of the psychopomp began to be played by angels, and the viaticum given to the dead by the sacrament of anointing with oil. Many Byzantines underwent pre-mortem tonsure in the hope of increasing their chances of salvation. The custom of preparing a special memorial meal (kutia) also stems from the pagan tradition of a meal by relatives at the grave of the deceased. It was rejected as a prejudice in the West, but preserved in the Byzantine Church. Kolivo was to be distributed on certain days after death (the 3rd, 7th or 9th, 30th or 40th), along with the recitation of appropriate prayers, because it was believed that during these days the soul passed through significant stages on its way to God. The deceased were also commemorated on the anniversary of their death and on the Sunday before the week of the Last Judgment. The Byzantines believed that the soul's fate could be influenced by prayers and donations to churches and monasteries.

== Life after death in Byzantium ==
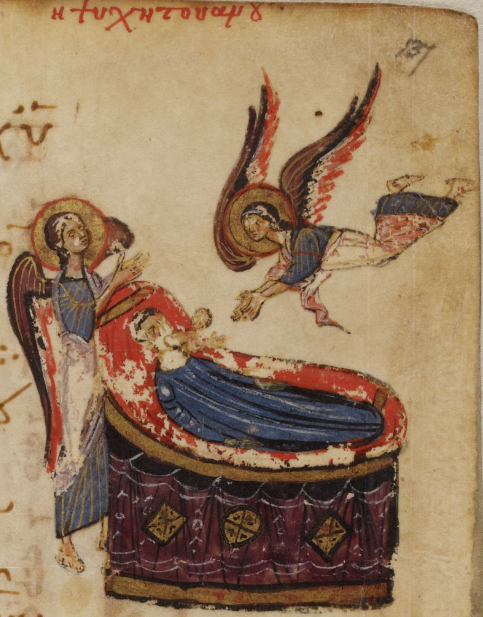
Separation of the soul from the body, Theodore's Psalter, fol. 137r. Manuscript from the collection of the British Museum, 1066.

The Byzantines certainly believed that death was not the end. At the same time, they believed that the existence of the soul outside the body was a matter of mystical experience rather than theological study. Most early Christian writers agreed that death consisted in the separation of the conscious soul from the material body, and believers hoped to await the end of the world in a comfortable place —Bosom of Abraham— and then to rise in the flesh and see the triumph of Christ. The position of the Byzantine Church on eschatological issues was in line with Orthodox dogma and left little room for interpretation. The Nicene-Chalcedonian Creed contained the dogma of the expectation of the resurrection from the dead and the future life. Christian theologians from Hippolytus of Rome (2nd-3rd centuries) believed that the resurrection would be physical, not spiritual. In the eighth century, one of the Church Fathers, John of Damascus, in his Sacred Parallels, in the chapter On the Time of Death, asserted that souls wait in the afterlife for the time determined by God, when all will be resurrected, but not by incarnation of souls, but bodily. Because of local peculiarities, the question of the bodily resurrection was given considerable attention in Egypt. Despite the condemnation of the custom of mummification by such prominent theologians as Shenoute and Augustine of Hippo, many Egyptians wished to preserve their bodies in a secure tomb for the greater assurance of resurrection.

In the absence of precise dogmatic definitions, the Byzantines showed considerable concern about the exact form of bodily resurrection and whether relatives and friends would be able to recognize each other afterward. The problem of "recognizing soul mates" (Greek κοινος αναγνωρισμος) arose as a reaction to dualistic teachings that downplayed the role of the material world. (Note: Of heretical doctrines the Manichaeans held different opinions, but their influence in Byzantium after the seventh century was negligible, as well as the Paulicians in the eighth and ninth centuries.) In Byzantium, with the essentially material character of its liturgical traditions, including iconoclasm, the view of the continuity of material existence after death and before the resurrection prevailed. The 7th century theologian Andreas of Caesarea called nonsense the idea that the resurrected body would be deprived of its organs, through which man glorified God in life, and of its sexuality. At the end of the eighth century, "angelic" and unrecognizable resurrected bodies were condemned by the monk Theodore the Studite as the Origenism heresy. A different answer to the same question was given in the 12th century by the historian and theologian Michael Glika. In his opinion, the lifelong separation of the sexes was the result of the loss of the primary sexless "angelic" state, to which one must eventually return.

With the end of the Dark Ages and the revival of interest in ancient philosophical theories, Byzantine thinkers began to take an interest in the problem of the transmigration of souls as an object of criticism. In the second half of the 9th century, Patriarch Photios refuted the teachings of the Neoplatonist Hierocles of Alexandria, who associated the soul with divine predestination. The views on metempsychosis of the philosopher John Italus, condemned by the Church in 1082, can only be roughly reconstructed. The corresponding anathematism was included in the Orthodox Synodic and was directed against those who "prefer the so-called wisdom of the foolish outward philosophers and follow their teachers and accept the reincarnation of human souls, or that they perish like wordless animals and go into nothingness, and consequently deny the resurrection, the judgment, and the final reward of life". As the Synod commentator J. Guillard points out, the anathema in such a formulation contains an obvious contradiction, since the Platonic doctrine of the transmigration of souls is incompatible with the Aristotelian theory of the destruction of the soul after death. Accordingly, it is impossible to accuse anyone of holding both approaches. According to Périclès-Pierre Joannou, Italus actually proved by logical arguments that the soul, although it continues to exist after death, does not continue its development indefinitely, but is limited by God's judgment of itself. Italus' theory was an attempt to correct Gregory of Nyssa's doctrine of the soul's infinite movement toward union with God, which the philosopher considered not to follow from the assumption of the finiteness of the time of divine judgment.

In the later period, the idea of the transmigration of souls apparently ceased to interest educated Byzantines, with the sole exception of the 15th-century philosopher Gemistos Plethon. The last time Byzantine theologians turned to the subject of the afterlife was as a result of disputes with Catholics at the Council of Ferraro-Florence in 1438-1439. Bishop Mark of Ephesus, a participant in the disputes with the Latins about purgatory, formulated the position of the Byzantine Church as follows: there are three categories of souls, the first of which are in Hades and have no chance of salvation, others who have already received divine grace, i.e. the saints, and others who are in the middle. The latter are the "intermediate" people who died in the Christian faith, but with minor sins for which they have not had time to repent, or with major sins for which they have repented, but have not had time to manifest the "fruits of contrition".

== Evolution of ideas about the fate of the soul ==
=== Origins of the doctrine of posthumous retribution ===
According to the German Byzantinist Hans-Georg Beck, the ideas about the afterlife are the best way to understand the religiously conditioned mentality of the Byzantines. The theme of the afterlife is reflected mainly in literature of a religious character — hagiographies, sermons, and liturgical manuals. The latter are relatively few, including Pseudo-Dionysius the Areopagite (6th century) and Symeon of Thessalonica (15th century). Since the early 1980s, studies of Byzantine “moral” apocalypses, which for a number of reasons had not previously received serious attention, have intensified. (Note: There is an approach which suggests that only those apocalypses which prophesy the political situation of the world and deal with collective rather than individual eschatology should be considered "real" apocalypses.) On the one hand, among scholars of Byzantine literature, the idea of these works as a “low genre” prevailed; on the other hand, the extremely extensive manuscript tradition did not allow for a canonical edition of the texts. The breakthrough was Eveline Patlagean's article Byzance et son autre monde. Observations sur quelques récits (1981), which showed for the first time the importance of apocryphal, including apocalyptic, texts for understanding the religious culture of the time. The doubts that arise as to whether religious literature reflects the mentality of the broader society and not only the concepts of individual theologians, Beck proposes to solve by turning to texts that, in his opinion, reflect the eschatological ideas of the masses. Accordingly, he based his analysis on descriptions in the 10th-century epic Digenes Akritas.

Many elements of Christian ideas about the afterlife, such as private judgment, purgatory as an intermediate state of the soul awaiting the Last Judgment, and the hope for the reward of vice and virtue, go back to the Jewish apocalyptic tradition. The most important text here is the Book of Enoch, in the oldest part of which — dating from the 3rd century BCE, the Book of the Guardians — provides a description of the temporary holding places for souls awaiting judgment. According to the book, the souls are kept in four deep cavities (Ancient Greek κοιλώματα), divided according to the degree of righteousness. The possibility of such a division presupposes a prior classification of the dead; that is, it may be regarded as a kind of private judgment. The Book of Enoch also describes a fiery prison for fallen angels and a valley for the eternally damned, later transformed into the Christian hell. In the Apocalypse of Zephaniah, the idea of a private judgment is set forth in more detail. Compiled in Egypt at the turn of the first millennium, the text tells of a vision in which the prophet Sophonias was shown angels recording in scrolls the good and evil deeds of people. Depending on which deeds outweigh, the soul is sent either to the righteous or to Gades. The Old Testament apocalypses were known not only to early Christian authors but also much later in Byzantium. Extracts from the Book of Enoch are cited in his chronicle by George Syncellus, and the Apocalypse of Zephaniahwas used in his historical work by Patriarch Nicephorus (d. 828).

The Apocalypse of Paul, dating from the 3rd–4th centuries and based on both the Jewish tradition and the earlier Apocalypse of Peter, paints a comprehensive picture of the afterlife reward for sins and righteousness. It survives in several editions, and the more elaborate Latin one includes all the elements that later became canonical: the appearance after death of a gloomy and a cheerful angel, showing the deceased his deeds; the angel's movement of the soul through the afterlife and showing various scenes along the way; the presence of the soul before God for judgment; hell as a place for the punishment of sinners; and various pleasing areas for the accommodation of the righteous. It also appears from the Apocalypse that a person's fate is predetermined on their deathbed when either a gloomy or cheerful angel appears to them, or even predetermined earlier, as the names of the righteous are inscribed on tables before the gates of paradise. The extent to which the Byzantines were familiar with Paul's Apocalypse is not well understood, but two texts popular in the Middle Byzantine period, the Apocalypse of the Theotokos and the Apocalypse of Anastasius, were based on it. Their peculiarity, which for a long time hindered scientific study, is the absence of canonical variants of the text. Numerous editions of these apocalypses contain significant differences in the descriptions of the afterlife and in the list of sins to be punished.

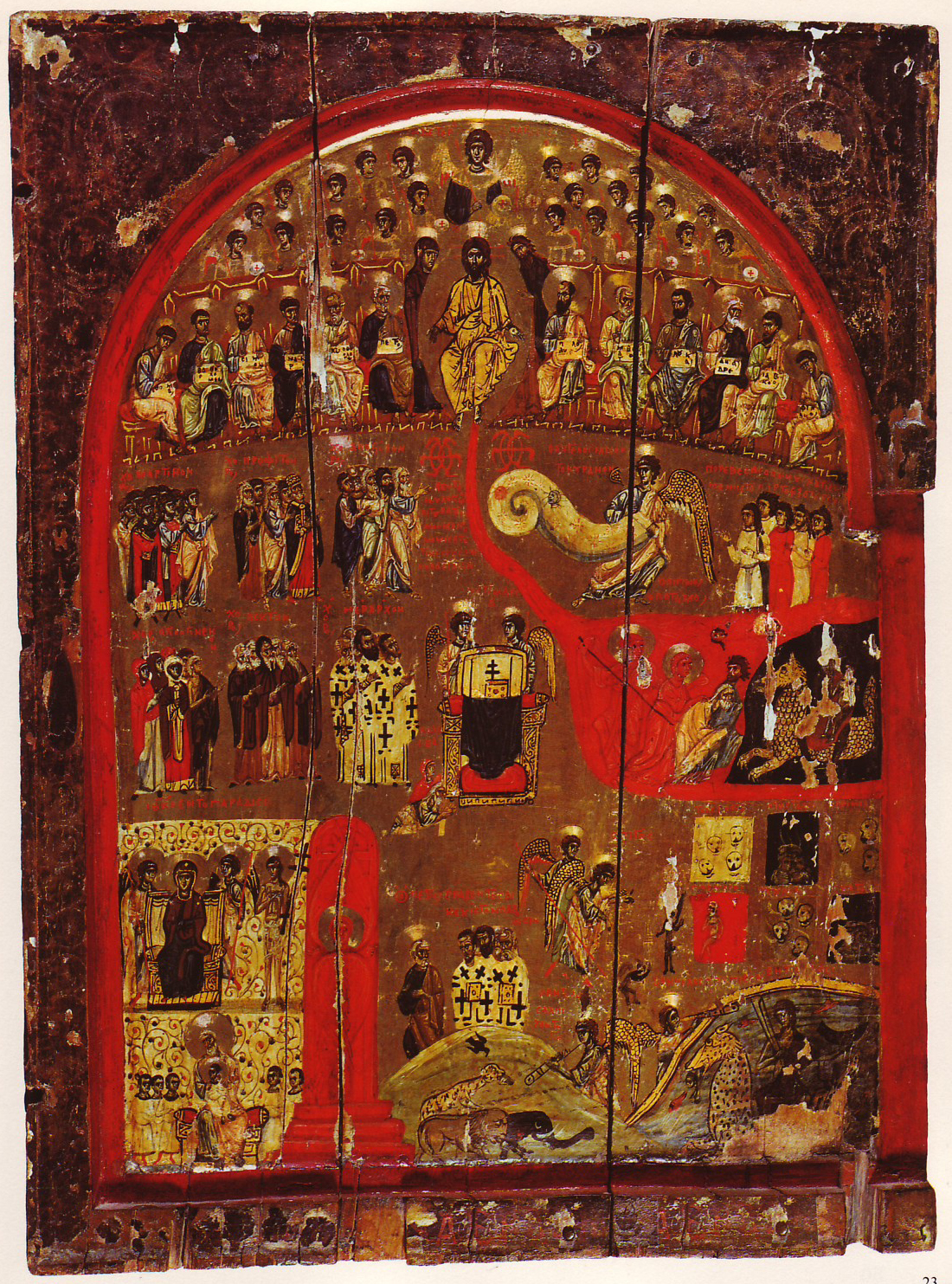
Icon of the Last Judgment. The lower part depicts paradise. 12th century (St. Catherine's Monastery, Sinai).

=== Private trial ===
Scenes of the Last Judgment are a common motif in temple decoration, and in hagiographic literature, scenes of the meeting of the soul separated from the body with its lifetime thoughts, words, and deeds are frequently depicted. Critical rethinking and analysis of deeds in hagiographic literature were often described as punishment carried out by evil demons following a court session in which the role of lawyers was played by angels. The court passed judgment, and it was implied that this judgment could be influenced not only in life but also after death. Such beliefs were never endorsed by the Church of Byzantium, which had no equivalent to the doctrine of purgatory adopted in the West. Unlike the Last Judgment, during which the fate of all people is to be decided, private judgment concerned the fate of an individual and took place immediately after death. In Orthodox eschatology, it was assumed that after this judgment, the souls of the righteous and sinners reside in paradise and hell, respectively, achieving neither perfect bliss nor perfect torment. Considered in historical context, the Byzantines' preoccupation with life after death functioned as a kind of collective, societal epistemology; that is, it was a means of self-definition, shaping, and expressing the community's image of itself. During political crisis, for example, interest in resurrection could express the hope of revival and restoration of national life.

During Late Antiquity, there was a wide range of views regarding the private judgment, but most can be assigned to one of two categories in terms of localizing the main events: either on the deathbed or after the ascension. The “aerial” scenario is first encountered in the third century by Origen, who interpreted Jn. 14:30 as an indication of the existence of demons checking at the border of the world to see if the soul has anything belonging to them. The Greek word τελώνας used by the theologian had the meaning of a farm (revenue leasing), thus referring to realities well known from everyday life. In such terminology, the demons were understood as publicans, and the places of communion with them as publicans. Significant similarities in Origen's version and Paul's Apocalypse point to the existence of an older tradition, possibly of Egyptian origin. Various details about the aerial judgment are given in the life of the 7th-century Alexandrian patriarch John the Merciful, who, according to his biographer, liked to talk about the soul leaving the body during periods of famine or plague. To those who came to him with a proud look, John told them about the taxation, bringing them to tears. The Apocalypse of Paul also contains a description of a kind of judgment at the bedside of the dying, but without details. In the life of John the Merciful, there is a story about the weighing of the deeds of a dying tax collector, whose sins are outweighed by a single piece of bread given to a beggar. Perhaps the plot with the scales is also of Egyptian origin and goes back to the Book of the Dead, where the god Anubis weighs the hearts of the dead; according to the results of the measurement, the soul either moved on or was destroyed. The concept of comparing the “weight” of deeds is found repeatedly in the Old Testament, in early Christian authors, and in hagiographical literature. According to the monk Anastasius Sinaita (7th century), the demons additionally press on the cup with evil deeds, but, as explained by his younger contemporary John of Damascus with a slight preponderance of evil, God gives his favor. A different version of the pre-death judgment, with the possibility of the dying person to justify himself for his deeds, is given in the work of St. John Climacus (Chapter 7, On Joyful Lamentation).

The idea of stops at which the soul is tested by demons in various vices and charged tribute is fully revealed in the vision of St. Basil the Younger about Theodora's walk on the air publicans (mid-10th century). According to Basil, the soul of the deceased passes through 22 stages, each of which reports information about the good and evil deeds committed during life. Depending on the balance of these deeds, the soul is sent to heaven or hell, but the outcome can be changed by the intercession of a saint. During the course of the imaginary journey, the angels explain to Theodora the essence of the taxation and the factors affecting posthumous fate. In particular, the number of sins recorded with demons can be reduced by repenting to a spiritual father, performing the penance assigned by him, and receiving forgiveness from him. Texts written later than the Vita of Basil the New predominantly rely on the story of Theodora. Such is, for example, the hagiography of the fictitious Archbishop of Constantinople, Niphon, compiled in the early 11th century, which sets forth a similar view of the organization of the ordeal. Of later works, Dioptra by Philip Monotropus (1095) is of interest, in one of its poetic chapters outlining the entire course of the afterlife from the moment of death to the Last Judgment. The story of Monotropus, in its main points, corresponds to the Life of Basil the New but does not refer to it directly and probably goes back to an older tradition. The result of centuries of Byzantine reflections on posthumous retribution was the Theological Chapters by Michael Glykas, who justified the struggle between angels and demons for the soul of the dying with references to the Bible and Sacred Tradition, avoiding any mention of the taxation and the procedure of weighing deeds. After Glykas, the discussion of private judgment virtually ceased, perhaps as a result of familiarity with the Catholic concept of purgatory.

=== The place of the soul ===
At the conclusion of the private judgment, the souls of the righteous and sinners went to heaven and hell, respectively. In Byzantine theology, there were various designations of hell that were not completely synonymous: the classical Greek Hades (Ancient Greek ᾍδης, also Gades) was rendered in the Septuagint for sheol and was understood as the abode of all the dead; the New Testament Gehenna (Ancient Greek γέεννα) had the meaning of a place of eternal fiery punishment. There was no unanimity among early Byzantine authors regarding the geography of the afterlife. In the 4th century, Gregory of Nyssa, passing on the words of his dying sister, argued that Hades was not a physical place but a state of the soul, thus refuting the outdated vertical stratification of the afterlife. The most influential exposition of the subject in Byzantium was Pseudo-Athanasius' Quaestiones ad Antiochum ducem, a catechism created in the late 7th and early 8th centuries. According to him, the souls of saints and the righteous go to Paradise, while the souls of sinners go to Hades, but in both cases, they experience only a foretaste of what is in store for them after the Last Judgment. Later on, the approach of pseudo-Athanasius was dominant, and at the end of the 9th century Patriarch Photios proved that paradise is not the same as the Kingdom of God, whose dignities are substantially higher. Similarly, in the second half of the eleventh century, Archbishop Theophylact of Ohrid, in his interpretation of Luke. 23:39-43 argued that the prudent robber entered paradise as a place of spiritual rest, but not the kingdom of heaven. Among alternative viewpoints, the most significant are the statements of the monk Niketas Stethatos, who argued that paradise was closed after Adam for lack of necessity. According to Stiphat, the reunion of the souls of the saints and the righteous before the face of the Trinity in the Kingdom of Heaven is like a reunion of old friends, and the same is true of the souls of sinners meeting their dark lord in Hades. Thus, Stiphatus sees the afterlife as a continuation of the earthly life. Nor does he see the need for a private judgment, since the direction of man's deeds is self-evident.

The problems of spatial localization, reachability, and topology of the afterlife are solved in different ways in the sources. In the vision of Basil the New, Theodora and her companions traverse water, air, and two clouds on their way to paradise. Upon arrival, Theodora sees the throne of God and a pastoral landscape with various dwellings of the saints. The dwellings are like palaces, and their appearance depends on the category to which the righteous person belongs (prophets, martyrs, saints, etc.). The most attractive is the bosom of Abraham, which is the residence of the twelve patriarchs and the souls of baptized infants. These last two areas form paradise. There was no single canon for describing paradise, and other authors emphasized different biblical characters. In the apocalypses of Theotokos and Anastasius, the protagonists travel west, south, or left of paradise, and the only manifestation of the vertical aspect is the throne located in the heavens. Thus, hell is not beneath the earth but is part of heavenly space, and sinners are not completely separated from God's authority. The areas of punishment for sinners and reward for the righteous in the apocalypses have a complex structure. According to historian Jane Baun, who has studied these apocalypses in detail, the allocation of certain types of transgressions (adultery, usury, eavesdropping, dishonest trade, etc.) for which specific punishments were intended reflected the moral demands of the rural community, defining patterns of righteous behavior.

== Funeral rituals ==
=== Funeral traditions continuity ===
A variety of funeral rituals existed in the territory of Greece as early as the Crito-Mycenaean period. The wake (ancient Greek πρόθεσις) began practically at the moment of death and had the character of a public event. After the enactment of restrictive laws in the 6th and 5th centuries BC, the wake moved inside the house or courtyard. The eyes and mouth of the deceased were covered by the closest relative, then the body was washed, oiled, and dressed, usually in white robes, by the women of the house. The body was then placed in the coffin with the feet facing outward. At this stage, the head of the deceased was left uncovered and crowned with a laurel wreath. The details of the mourning that followed are depicted in numerous images on funerary steles and ceramic vases. The ritual included various gestures, lamentations by women, movements around the coffin, and chants. The length of the wake varied from 9 days in the case of Hector to the three days recommended by Solon and common in ancient times. Gifts were brought on the third, ninth and thirtieth days, then on the anniversary and in honor of certain festivals dedicated to the dead. The first gifts were locks of hair, wine, oil, and frankincense. The anniversary offerings were more varied and included food as well as kutia (ancient Greek κόλλυβα) made of dried and fresh fruit. The offerings were never made in silence, accompanied by the lamentations of the mourners.

With the spread of Christianity, pagan funeral rituals did not fall into disuse and are recorded in a variety of sources, from the sermons of the Church Fathers to the treatise On Ceremonies by Emperor Constantine Porphyrogenitus, and in all segments of society. We can say that throughout the Roman and Byzantine periods, throughout the Greek world, there was a standard ritual consisting of four stages: death and pre-burial activities; funeral procession; activities in the cemetery and repose of the body; activities after the funeral.

In Roman Egypt, the source of the tradition was the ancient Egyptian burial rituals, which coexisted for a long time with the Christian ones. Archaeological investigations of cemeteries from the 3rd to the 7th century have revealed many mummies, but the technology of mummification has become simpler compared to the classical period. Mummies are found not only in pagan burials, but also in Christian burials, including monastic burials.

=== Common mortals ===
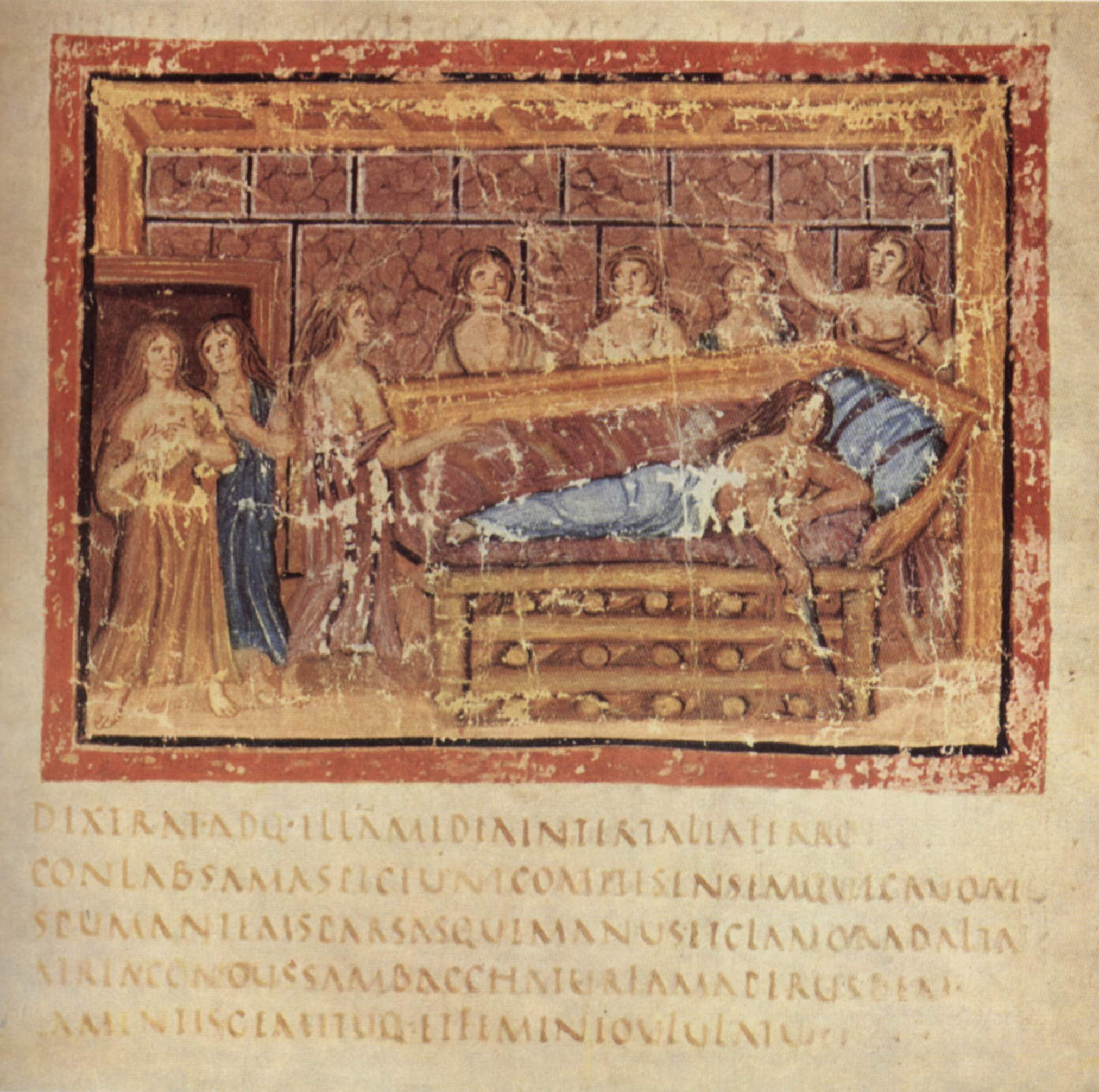
Death of Dido, miniature from the Vatican Virgil, early 5th century

==== On a deathbed ====
The Byzantines, like the ancient Romans and Greeks, avoided using the words "death" or "dying," preferring a variety of euphemisms. A person could be said to be "gone," "passed by," "gone from this mortal world," or "no longer with us. The Emperor Constantine Porphyrogenitus, according to the historian Leo the Deacon, "left life and found rest in another world". People "gave up the universal duty", "emptied the quiver of life allotted to them," or they were "cut off by the blow of the saber of death". Soldiers fallen on the battlefield were "thrown at the entrance of Hades" and "swam sadly across Acheron".

Every Byzantine hoped to die surrounded by his family after receiving all the necessary sacraments. Only the saints could know the hour of their death in advance and, knowing it, prepare for it. Many hagiographies give examples such as the 8th century Saint Philaretos the Merciful, who bought a tomb in a monastery, gathered his children and grandchildren and communicated with each of them. The epic hero Digenes Akritas bids farewell to his wife and gives her a final farewell. The agonizing death of Digenis from lumbago is the climax of the poem, and on the basis of the material of its pathos description, Hans Georg Beck has proposed the thesis that the church doctrine of death did not seem convincing enough to the Byzantines, and that in the mass consciousness death was still associated with the underworld of Hades. The wife of Digenis prays to God not for the salvation of the dying man's soul, but for his recovery, which, according to Beck, is not in accordance with Christian principles, and consequently her attitude toward death differs little from the sentiments that were common in Heroic Greece. (Note: In his analysis, Beck relies on the Escorial manuscript version of the poem, in which, according to the researcher, the description of death reflects popular perceptions to a greater extent than in the Grottaferrata manuscript version.) In the Christian era, those present prayed and offered forgiveness to the dying person. Preparations for the funeral began well in advance, taking into account the dying person's last wishes, selecting a burial place, and purchasing the necessary materials. If necessary, a will was drawn up and notarized in the presence of witnesses.

Shortly before death, a priest came to confess sins and administer the sacrament of the Eucharist, which became a kind of analog of the pagan viaticum (ancient Greek ἐφόδιον). Those who wished could receive a premillennial tonsure and a new monastic name. In Byzantium, no special rite of sobriety was practiced. The ritual sequence for the dying in its final form developed only in the 14th century and consisted of the opening enarxis, the reading of Psalm 50 (51), the canon, the prayer, and the conclusion. Most manuscripts attribute the authorship of the canon to the hymnographer Andrew of Crete (d. 740). The eight troparia of the canon tell the story of a dying monk in the first person, from the preparations for death to the moment when the protagonist finds himself in dark Hades awaiting resurrection.

For most Byzantines, the arrival of a priest was a sure sign of the near end and a signal to begin mourning. Although Byzantines prayed for a peaceful end to their lives, popular belief held that the soul left the body after a fierce struggle (psychomachia). The dying person was said to have terrifying visions of angels and demons judging his or her past life. It was believed that the soul was weighed on scales at the moment of death, and Eustathius of Thessalonica, commenting on the works of Homer in the 12th century, called the expression "lying on the scales of Hades" a popular synonym for the word "death". Later church paintings often depict the deceased accompanied by the archangel Michael, who plays the role of psychopomp. Speculation about the afterlife was mostly the prerogative of monks, who were considered experts in eschatological matters. In hagiographical literature, it is common to find monks gathered around a dying brother who recounts his death visions.

==== Burial preparations ====
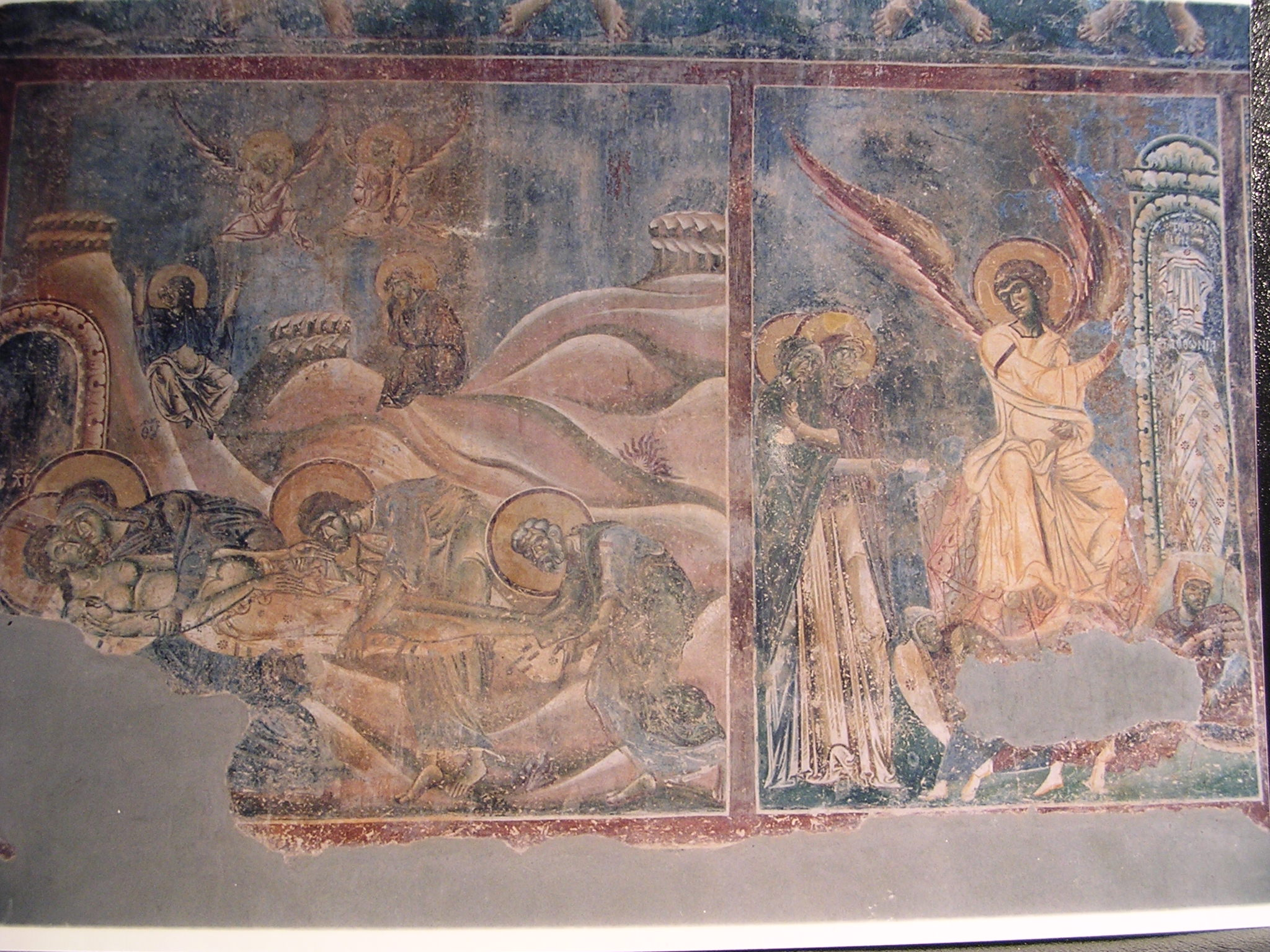
Mourning on a fresco from the church of St. George, in Kurbinovo, late 12th century

The preparation of the body for burial has changed little since antiquity. (Note: Body preparation was predominantly done by women, partly as an extension of domestic duties, partly due to their lower social status than men.) First, the eyes and mouth of the deceased were closed. (Note: The modern Greek custom of having the eyes of the deceased closed by a child or close relative is not mentioned in Byzantine sources.) Then began the washing of the body with warm water or oil mixed with spices; wine, milk, and honey were also used, together or separately. The anointing took place during or after the washing and was repeated, if necessary, during the funeral. The mourners smeared the body with aromatic substances, the choice of which was determined by financial possibilities. In this way, the smell of decomposition was eliminated and the appearance of the corpse was improved, and from a ritual point of view, oiling symbolized purification from sins. The ritual of dressing the body did not change significantly. Relatives or their assistants dressed the body in the best clothes, preferably white. When choosing clothes for burial, it was necessary to take into account that excessive luxury could attract grave robbers. (Note: According to the 10th-century legal compendium Basilika, armed robbery in a cemetery was punishable by death, while unarmed robbery was punishable by exile.) The body was then wrapped in a shroud, also called a lazaroma, and its resemblance to the cloths used to wrap babies symbolized death as the birth of new life. Monks and clerics were buried in appropriate vestments and with the Gospel in their hands, while emperors were buried with regalia. Sometimes, despite the objections of Christian theologians, a wreath was placed on the head of the deceased in honor of life's victories or other achievements. Another custom, preserved from Roman times to the present day, is the placing of a coin, the "Charon's obol", in the mouth or on the body of the corpse, necessary to pay for the journey to the afterlife.

The location of the body was also determined by custom. Immediately after death, before being washed, oiled and dressed, the body was placed on a stretcher or cart for transportation to the cemetery. It could be a bed on an elevation or on supports, or a coffin made of various materials, most often wood. The body was fixed in the same way as today — in a lying position, with straight legs and arms folded on the chest. The coffin was decorated with olive, laurel or other branches. The presence of the body in the house allowed relatives and those who wished to express their grief before the funeral. The ancient custom of keeping three days between the death and the funeral was maintained, but often the period of mourning was considerably shortened and the body remained in the house for only one night. During this time, the house, whose walls, windows and doors were draped with black cloth, was plunged into mourning. During the wake, the mourners were supposed to place their cut hair on the body of the deceased.

The tradition from classical antiquity of showing mourning by pulling out hair and scratching the skin with fingernails survived, but many prominent early Christian theologians disapproved of such excessive displays. Like other acts, mourning was a predominantly female endeavor. The participation of female servants was also assumed. In the early 5th century, John Chrysostom condemned funeral singing as blasphemy, and no less than eight of his sermons were directed against the custom of hiring mourners. It was not mourning itself that was condemned, however, but its pagan connotations, (Note: The same problem confronted Egyptian theologians, and Shenoute opposed female lamentation at funerals, which he considered a relic of ancient Egyptian rituals.) and the fact that hired mourners participated in funeral processions. With the spread of Christianity, psalmody replaced threnody at funerals, and people began to organize vigils at the body with candle.

==== Funeral ====
Funerals were considered a religious and social obligation, and their absence or improper conduction was considered as an act of extreme dishonor. Military manuals instructed commanders to see that fallen soldiers were buried. Eustathius of Antioch in the 4th century cited a folk legend that a hawk, seeing an unburied body, begins to cover it with earth, thus expressing the most universal law of nature. Special services were held in memory of those drowned at sea (Greek Ψυχοσάβββατο, "the Sabbath of all souls"). The attitude toward the possibility and method of burying persons of other denominations and heretics also had its peculiarities. The length and scope of funerals depended on the social status of the deceased, but if in the Roman period large processions were organized in honor of aristocrats, in the Byzantine period a similar scope was more typical for church hierarchs. Funerals were considered an expensive affair on which it was not customary to save. Emperors since Constantine the Great tried to regulate the cost of funerals to make them more accessible to the poor, but apparently unsuccessfully. The funerals of the poor were often paid for out of charitable funds. At solemn funerals, the choir singing religious hymns was joined by people carrying torches and candles. Gregory of Nyssa, recounting the funeral of his sister Macrina, wrote: "In front, many deacons and servants, lined up in rows on either side of the bier, led the procession; they all held wax candles in their hands, and everything that happened resembled a mysterious procession, with the consonant singing of psalms spreading from one end to the other, like the singing of the three young men". As St. John Chrysostom explains, the use of torches expresses the movement of the soul towards "the true light". For later periods, much less is known about funeral descriptions, but, as before, the problem of excessive pathos persisted. There were also possible excesses of the opposite kind: in the case of the death of a debtor, creditors could use his funeral as a last opportunity to collect the debt from the heirs; strict laws were enacted against such disturbances of the peace.

Initially, the body was taken to the parish church or cemetery chapel for the funeral service. The coffin with the shrouded body was carried into the temple on the shoulders of relatives and placed in the narthex with the head facing west. Throughout the service, the coffin remained open, allowing the congregation to see the face of the deceased one last time and to kiss it. The service was intended to emphasize the meaning of death as a passage to a place free of pain and sorrow. Detailed liturgical descriptions have been preserved since the 10th century. Several dozen funeral prayers and canons are known, used according to the category of the deceased — monks, lay people, children, and clergy were distinguished. The prayers appealed to Christ as the only judge to grant rest and forgiveness. Of great importance in the funeral service are the divine chants. Compared to non-liturgical sources, the prayers reflect a significantly simplified (in the words of Ph. Ariès, banalized) idea of the fate of the soul. They do not mention angels and demons as participants in disputes at the bedside of the dying and in private judgment. On the contrary, Christ is practically absent as a central figure in non-liturgical sources.

When the funeral procession reached the burial site, the singing of psalms ceased to allow for a final farewell to the deceased (ancient Greek: τελευταιος ασπασμος). After the burial, it was time to read the eulogies and epitaphs. The inscriptions on the tombstone ranged from a simple statement of the name and dates of life to poetic works. Many of these last sermons for his aristocratic friends were written by the poet of the first half of the 14th century, Manuel Philes. The British historian Margaret Alexiou suggests that the cold rhetoric of the formal speeches was intended to counteract the uncontrollable grief of the people. The body was then placed in the grave, with or without a coffin, often together with various objects brought by the mourners. Ceramic shards with the sign of the cross were used to ward off evil spirits. Cremation, considered a pagan practice, was no longer used by Christians from the 5th century and was officially forbidden by the Church from 768. Coptic burials in Egypt often include "appeals to the living" in which various exhortations are made on behalf of the deceased, emphasizing the fragility of earthly life.

==== Commemoration ====
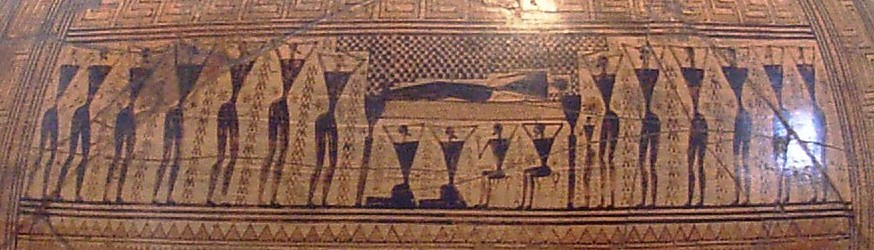
Ritually raised hands during a memorial, depicted on a Dipylon amphora, 8th century BC

On the evening of the day of the funeral, a banquet was organized for relatives, close friends, and representatives of the Church, as was called in ancient Greek περίδειπνον. A custom against which Chrysostom spoke out particularly strongly was the placing of food, clothing, and lighted candles on the grave on the third, ninth, and fortieth days after the death: the poor could find a better use for them, and the rich would give them to the poor or to the Church. Nevertheless, the offerings were accepted as acceptable by the Church after the days were given a proper Christian explanation. (Note: Rituals with pagan roots are recorded until the 12th century. Metropolitan Nekita of Thessalonica mentions pigeons killed on graves, but considers this dish as an acceptable variant of a memorial meal.) Nine days of mourning was considered normal, during which the spouse of the deceased was expected to wear black robes and was allowed to neglect his or her appearance. Moderate mourning, not exceeding one year, was encouraged by the Church.

The main stages in the posthumous wanderings of the soul corresponded to the commemorative events organized by relatives on special days, approximately the same (3rd, 9th and 40th) as in the pagans. One of the versions of the explanation of why the commemoration should be organized exactly on the specified days is attributed to the Egyptian ascetic of the 4th century, Macarius the Great. According to his explanation, for three days (which believers associate with the resurrection of Christ on the third day) the soul does not leave the places familiar to it during its life, and then, accompanied by an angel, it begins its journey to heaven together with the angel. Then it visits the wonders of Paradise until the sixth day, and then descends to Hell for three more days. On the fortieth day (commemorated in honor of Moses), the soul would appear before God and listen to His decision. This explanation was not the only one, and other authors saw in these commemorative dates the milestones of the gradual decomposition of the body, a process inverse to the formation of the human embryo. The face was thought to be formed on the third day after conception and therefore destroyed on the third day after death. Similarly, just as the body gradually disintegrates, the soul goes through stages of formation in the "post-mortem womb".

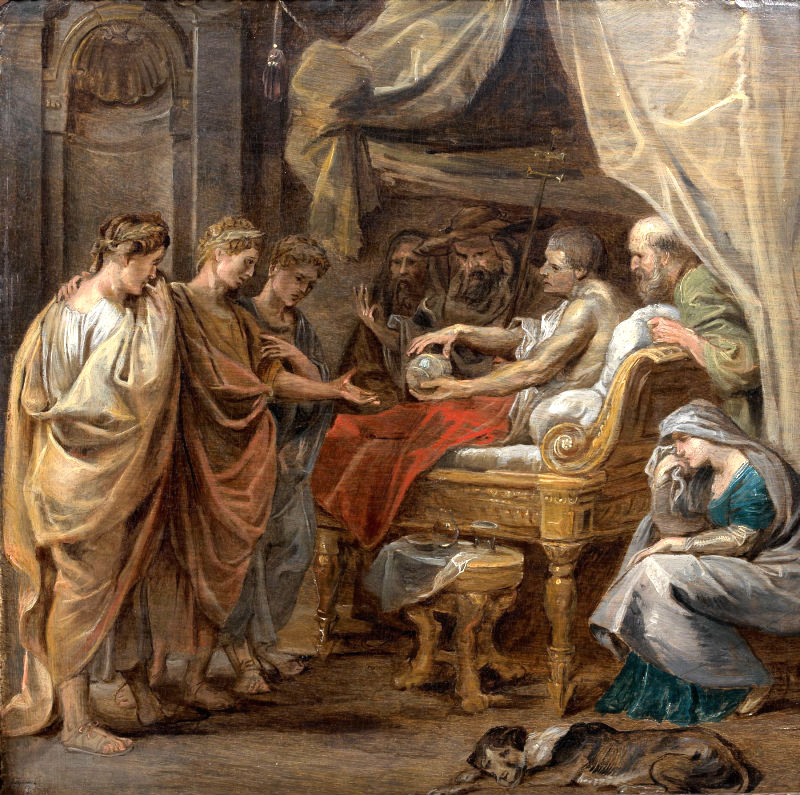
Death of Constantine, Peter Paul Rubens, 1622

=== The Emperor's death ===
The ideological basis of the Roman imperial funeral ritual was the ceremony of consecration (Latin: consecratio), i.e. the deification of the emperor. The death of the emperor raised two major problems: the posthumous status of the deceased monarch and the establishment of the legal succession. As the American historian Sabine McCormack notes, holding a consecration ceremony was one of the few ways to resolve the difficulties that arose. Deeply rooted in society, it survived in Christian Byzantium along with other vestiges of paganism. A change of emphasis in the understanding of consecration occurred in the 3rd and 4th centuries, especially during the Tetrarchy, when the emperor's accession to power came to be understood as a sign of his election by God. In such a paradigm, there was no need to confirm the divine status and further substantiate the legitimacy of the inheritance of power, and death added nothing in this regard. Under Diocletian's successors (284-305), the understanding of consecration as an act that did not require human participation persisted. According to British Byzantinist Patricia Carlin-Hater, the death of the emperor was an opportunity for the people to express their attitude toward the person who for a short time personified the supreme power. According to the researcher, imperial funerals existed in two fundamentally different forms. The first, which began with the funeral of Constantine the Great in 337, was a solemn ritual lasting several months and ending with the repose of the deceased emperor's body in the Church of the Apostles. The second, which can be characterized as "negative funerals", was carried out in relation to deposed monarchs or defeated usurpers.

The tradition of Byzantine imperial burials goes back to Constantine the Great, the first ruler of the Roman Empire, who was buried in Constantinople. The solemn ceremony, described in detail by Eusebius of Caesarea, followed the well-known descriptions of the funerals of Octavianus Augustus, Pertinax and Septimius Severus. On the other hand, its duration allowed Constantine's sons to return to the capital and decide on the division of power without giving the army the impression that its intervention was necessary to end the impotence. Finally, it was necessary to adapt the ritual to the new Christian realities. The farewell to Constantine probably lasted from the day of his death on May 22, 337, until the announcement of his sons Augustus on September 9. Constantine had chosen the place of his burial in advance, building a mausoleum and a church on one of the hills of Constantinople. According to Eusebius, Constantine believed that "relics of him will be pleased with the name apostolic, and wish even after death to participate in the prayers that will be raised in this temple in honor of the apostles". Under his son Constantius II, the tomb was rebuilt as a family necropolis, and Byzantine emperors were buried there until Anastasius I in 518. By the time of Justinian I's death in 565, the old mausoleum was filled, and it was necessary to build a new burial complex, also in the Church of the Apostles. (Note: The first to be buried in the new mausoleum was Justinian's wife, Theodora, in 548.) Burials were held there until 1028, but the representatives of the then ruling Macedonian dynasty preferred the Mireleion built by Romanos Lekapenos. (Note: Except for Basil II (d. 1025), who was buried in the Eudom monastery of St. John the Baptist.) After the death of John II Comnenus in 1143, emperors were buried in the Pantokrator Monastery.

The imperial funeral rituals are described in the treatise On Ceremonies. The first stage of the funeral rituals was quite traditional, beginning with the priest's visit and the administration of the last communion, and ending with the mourning of close relatives. After the body was placed in the coffin, the public part of the funeral began, in which the number of participants gradually increased. Finally, dressed in full imperial regalia, a golden tunic and a crown, the body was carried in a litter to the Triclinium of the Nineteen Boxes, one of the most spacious rooms of the Great Palace. There, the clergy of Hagia Sophia and the senators gathered under the direction of the prepossessor of the Sacred Bedchamber. At the prepossessor's command, they shouted three times, "Forward, Emperor! The Emperor of Emperors and Lord of Lords calls you". Then the body was carried into another room of the palace, the Chalke, where the usual rites were performed. Again the words "Go forth" were uttered three times, after which the body was carried to the place of burial amid the singing of psalms. At the end of the ceremony the crown was replaced by a special headdress.

Of the 94 emperors who ruled Byzantium until 1453, 36 lost power through usurpation or military defeat. Since the emperor was traditionally considered to be the one who received power as a result of a special ceremony, including the acclamation of representatives of the army and the people, as well as receiving the crown from the hands of the patriarch, the usurper had to signify the legitimacy of his power in some other way. One of these ways was to perform insulting acts on the corpses of his murdered predecessors. One of the first to do this was Emperor Justinian II, who was overthrown in 695. After regaining power 10 years later, he ordered the usurpers Leontius and Tiberius beheaded and their bodies thrown into the sea. Michael II, who came to power in a coup, did the same with the remains of Leo V in 820. Compromise is the case of killed in 869 Nikephoros II — his body, after a day lay thrown in the snow, was modestly buried in the Church of the Apostles. In 843, the remains of the iconoclastic emperor Constantine V, who died in 775, were thrown out of Constantine's tomb and scattered to the wind, and his sarcophagus was destroyed and used to build a church.

== The dead and the alive ==
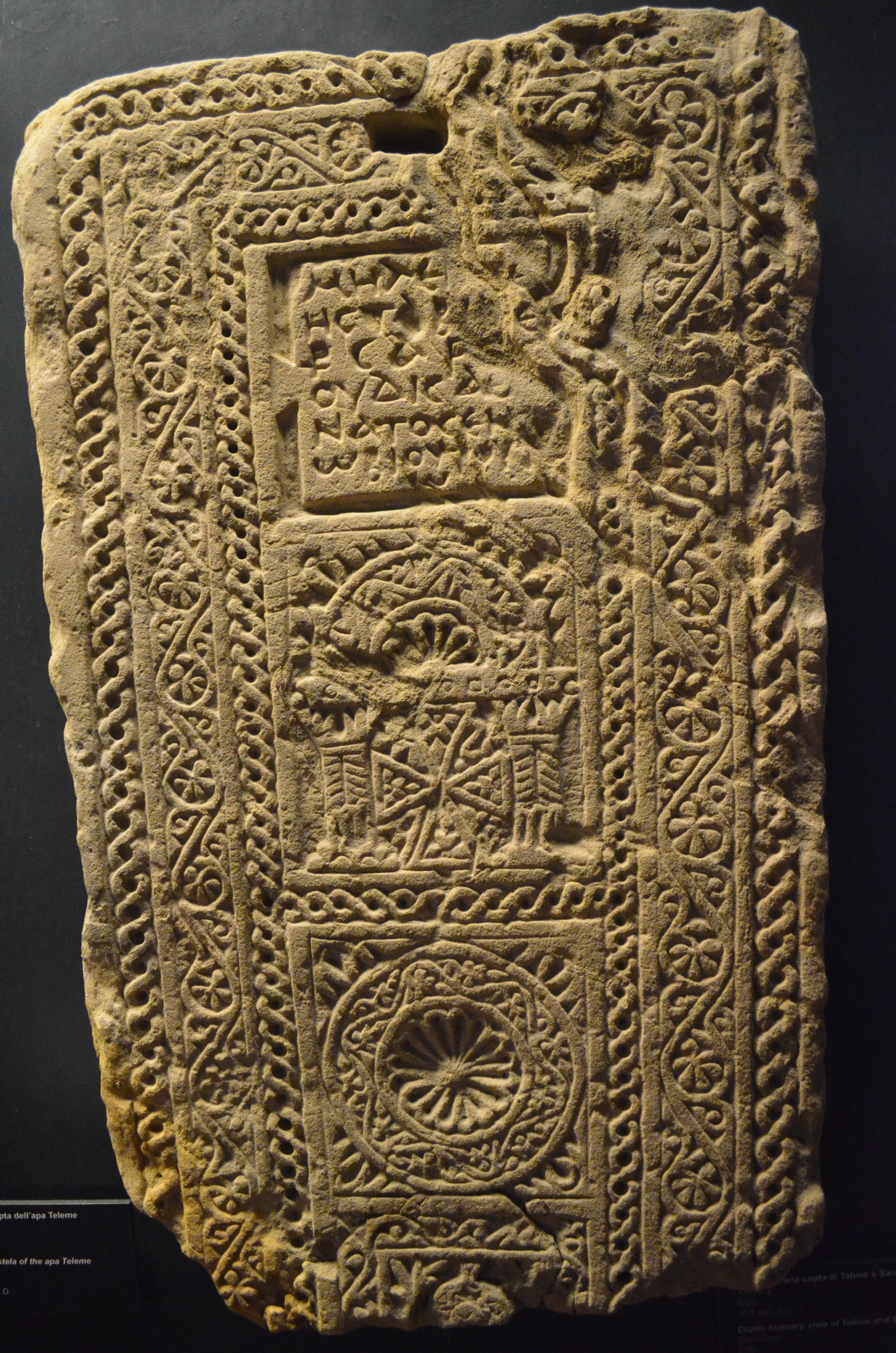
Coptic funerary stele, Upper Egypt, Byzantine period. In the upper quadrant of the stele there is a tablet with the names of the deceased in Greek and a consoling inscription urging not to mourn the deceased because we are all mortal in this life.

According to the radical point of view repeatedly expressed by the famous Byzantinist Alexander Kazhdan, horizontal ties were extremely underdeveloped in Byzantine society outside the nuclear family. On the other hand, the presence of cultural and behavioral traditions, which are difficult to explain from the position of social atomism, encourages researchers to identify different types of communities. One form of "horizontal" social associations, within which numerous versions of "moral" apocalypses could be created, are various types of secular partnerships (adelphopoesis, diakonia). In Italy, Egypt, Syria, Palestine, Asia Minor, and Greece, they often provided funeral services for their members. Associated with churches, monasteries, and miraculous icons, the brotherhoods held annual processions, services, and banquets in honor of their heavenly patrons. Outside of the 5th and 7th centuries, evidence of their existence is extremely scarce. The few surviving founding documents of the brotherhoods speak of the organization of funerals for members and the needy, as well as annual commemorative banquets. Activities were financed by membership fees; the donors of many societies were emperors. Members of the brotherhoods were laymen and clergy.

For the Byzantines, keeping memory alive as part of an absolute moral obligation was one of the important features of life after death. Commemoration was seen as a reflection of mutual relations, and Symeon of Solun wrote: "We must remember our deceased brothers so that others may remember us after them". Donations were intended to guarantee the performance of services and often took the form of donations to monasteries. In pagan tradition, sacrifices to the dead were intended to appease their souls and prevent them from returning to earth and disturbing the peace of the living. The early Christian church forbade all burial customs that resembled pagan "superstitions. The Church replaced memorial meals with the Eucharist on cemetery altars, thus expressing gratitude to God on the occasion of a Christian's righteous death. The idea of the intercession of the living for the dead, which had no theological basis in either the Old or the New Testament, found confirmation of its efficacy in widespread pious stories. The Western story of Gregory Dvoeslov's pardon by the Emperor Trajan, in the translation of the pseudo-John Damascene, ends with God's request to the Pope never again to pray for the impious. According to the doctrine of Mark of Ephesus on the three types of souls, formulated in the later period, prayers are offered for all the dead, not only for the "average", but with varying effectiveness.

The body was understood as the basis of human identity, so that material remains and memorial objects played a crucial role in preserving the memory of the deceased. British historian Judith Herrin notes that from the 8th century onwards, female members of the Macedonian dynasty became increasingly concerned with caring for the resting place of their relatives. According to the researcher, by reburying the remains, women showed a political initiative that was often not available to them, and demonstrated responsibility for the fate of the dynasty and the preservation of the memory of its representatives. For ordinary Byzantines, the memory of past emperors had a very limited meaning. The Synaxarion of the Church of Constantinople of the tenth century, while listing a variety of memorable events for the city, such as sieges and earthquakes, does not indicate many days commemorated in honor of emperors and members of their families. Nicholas Mesaritus, who wrote a description of the Church of the Apostles in the 12th century, listed 18 tombs in the church. Noting the paucity of information preserved about the tombs, Mesaritus sees no tragedy in this: "As for the others, why should we care if the memory of them is buried in their tombs? At the end of the Middle Byzantine period, the commemoration of the members of the dynasty acquired a greater scope thanks to the numerous donations of the Comneni for the development of monasteries. Among the typical features of the monasteries they founded was the requirement that the monks pray for the absolution of the Emperor, Empress and members of their families. Annual services required expensive consecrations, for which a significant part of the monasteries' income was allocated.

Byzantine art depicted a wide range of emotions, but artists most often turned to the depiction of sadness and mourning. Modern scholars distinguish two periods, the Macedonian Renaissance in the 10th century and the second half of the 12th century during the reign of the Komnenos dynasty, when interest in depicting human emotions was particularly strong. According to a classification proposed by the American Byzantinist Henry Maguire, three broad categories can be distinguished in the depiction of grief in Byzantine art: manifestations with frenzied gestures, inner contemplative experiences, and ambivalent manifestations that can be interpreted as other emotions. For manifestations of the first type, more related to death-related experiences, Byzantine authors had many examples from ancient literature, ranging from the scene of Achilles sprinkling ashes on his head upon learning of Patroclus' death to Theagenes beating himself on the head and pulling out his hair while grieving for Chariclea. Later Byzantine authors also presented their characters' experiences in similar terms. It is likely that their descriptions reflected actual practices, at least this is true of Anna Komnenos' detailed account of her father's death agony and her mother's grie. Some ancient authors criticized intemperance in mourning, with Cicero categorizing "gaunt looks, scratching of the cheeks, blows on the chest, the thighs, the head" as humiliating manifestations. Early Christian writers, for whom such behavior reflected less a disregard for propriety than a lack of faith, also spoke out against excessive concern for the dead. Later Byzantine theologians believed that expressions of intense grief were incompatible with belief in the resurrection of the dead. In the 8th century, John Damascene explained that formerly the human race was cursed and death was a punishment, and therefore mourned, but after the incarnation of the God-man, death should be understood as the transformation of human nature into immortality. Thus, in the Middle Byzantine period, the works of Byzantine art, if they depict deep mourning with extreme external manifestations, do so mainly in the context of Old Testament themes. In the iconography of the death of Christ and the repose of the Virgin Mary in the early and middle period, scenes of self-flagellation and hair-pulling are rare, but they are found in depictions of the raising of the son of the widow of Nain and the beating of infants. The latter belong more to another tradition connected with the mourning of mothers for their dead children.

== Material evidence ==
=== Demographics ===
Until the middle of the 20th century, the issue of life expectancy in Byzantium had not been specifically studied, and historians had mainly narrative sources at their disposal. According to these, old age was defined as 50–60 years, and over 70 years as extremely old. Among the representatives of the Macedonian dynasty, the average age was 59 years, although Emperor Basil II (958-1025) lived 72 years and his niece Theodora 76 years. The Comneni, who ruled in the 11th century, lived an average of 61 years (if we exclude Emperor Alexius II, who was killed at the age of 14), about as long as the Palaeologians who replaced them. Monks and saints lived long lives, sometimes reaching the age of a century. Since the 1970s, several large-scale archaeological studies of Byzantine burials have been conducted in Greece and Asia Minor. For men who reached adulthood, (Note: Those who died after, roughly, 15-17.5 years of age.) the average life expectancy was about 35.5 years, for women about 5 years less. The French historian Évelyne Patlagean, based on epigraphic material from gravestones collected in the eastern Mediterranean, found that female mortality peaked between the ages of 15 and 24, which she attributed to complications or consequences of the first pregnancy and childbirth. Patlagean estimates that most women died between the ages of 25 and 34, while most males died between the ages of 34 and 44, though these estimates do not include children before the age of 15. According to her data, 9% of men and 5% of women lived to old age. According to Angelica Laiou's data for Byzantine Macedonia, 71% of women did not live to the age of 45, and 74% of men died before the age of 50. Laiou also estimated that in Byzantine Egypt (5th - 6th centuries), "after precarious infancy", the average life expectancy for men was 44.7 years while the average life expectancy for women was 42.4 years. Other historians estimate, based on bioarchaeological findings, that the average life expectancy in Byzantium was between 35 to 40 years.

The infant mortality rate in Byzantium is difficult to estimate. Probably half of all children did not survive to the age of 5. This proportion applies both to Macedonian peasants in 1300 and to the children of the statesman of the first half of the 15th century, Demetrius Laskaris Leontaris, of whose 12 children 7 died in childhood. After the age of five, the chances of survival increased, but mortality remained high at any age.

=== Cemeteries ===
A significant change in public attitudes that occurred after the spread of Christianity in the Roman Empire was the appearance of cemeteries in cities. The laws of the Twelve Tables forbade the burial and burning of the dead in cities, and the prohibition was last reaffirmed under Diocletian in 290. Exactly how it was abolished is not clear, and the French Byzantinist Gilbert Dagron sees here the birth of a new Christian anthropology that banalized death and desacralized the city. The change was not sudden, and early Christian authors such as Gregory of Nyssa and John Chrysostom expressed the same aversion to corpses in the city as the ancient Romans. The change probably began with the appearance of martyrs' tombs, whose proximity was thought to help protect the tomb from grave robbers. As a result, the first Christian cemeteries were formed around the graves of martyrs outside the city. The coincidence of cemeteries and peripatetic churches is considered a phenomenon that originated in Roman Africa and then spread to Spain and Rome. A law of Emperor Theodosius I in 381 (CTh, IX.17.6) stipulated that churches and other parts of the city could not be used as burial grounds, with a specific exception for the remains of apostles and martyrs. (Note: In the West, burial inside the walls of churches was banned by the First Council of Braga in 561.) Subsequent legislation brought no further clarity to the matter, and Emperor Leo VI (886-912) was forced to declare the de facto repeal of the legal prohibitions by Christian custom and common sense. Social considerations, such as the fact that only the wealthy could afford to transport corpses out of the city and visit the graves of their loved ones, also played a role. Thus, from the 7th century, cemeteries appeared in the urban space, occupying, for example, the ancient agora.

The ancient Romans, who had many names for tombstones and structures, had no specific word for their location. The later Latin coemeterium comes from the Greek κοιμητήριον, "bedroom", according to John Chrysostom, it is so called because the people buried there are not dead, but asleep. Cemeteries could be both underground (catacombs) and above ground (areae). The underground necropolises (hypogaea) of Constantinople consisted of a large number of vaulted rooms divided by frescoed walls. Ancient Christian cemeteries found in Africa are a haphazard collection of stone sarcophagi surrounding a basilica dedicated to a local martyr. In later times, common cemeteries were simply rows of graves oriented with the heads facing east. The French historian Ph. Ariès, noting the brevity or complete absence of inscriptions on early medieval tombs, saw in the transition from burial in sarcophagi to the use of coffins an emphasis on the anonymity of burial and indifference to the exact place where the body rested in the ground.

Canon law did not permit mass burials. Other well-known injunctions include the prohibition of lay burials in monastic cemeteries. There were special cemeteries for criminals, especially murderers. Pagans were not buried in Christian cemeteries, but there were mixed cemeteries, at least in Egypt. The burial could take the form of a single tomb with a slab, stele, or ciborium on top, an arkosolium with a sarcophagus, or a mausoleum. The tomb was surrounded by a stone or metal fence, lamps and icons were placed nearby.

=== Graves ===
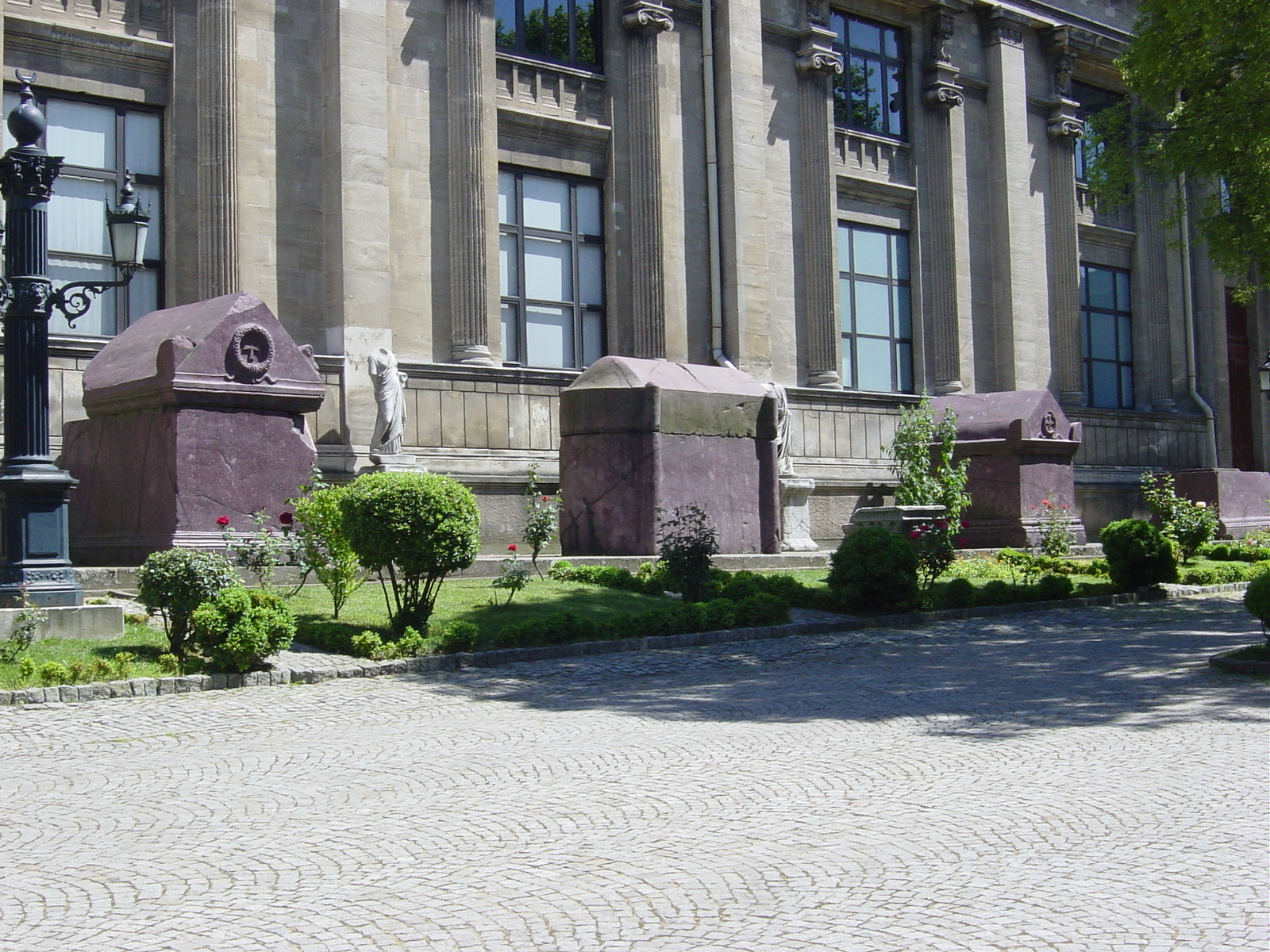
Porphyry sarcophagi of Byzantine emperors in the Istanbul Archaeology Museum

In spite of the prohibition, confirmed by the canons of Theodosius I, burials in churches continued. The exception was made, first of all, for cotators and members of their families, i.e. representatives of the highest classes of society. The burials inside the churches of the later period are relatively well preserved. Faced with a steady decline in income, churches and monasteries readily agreed to take care of the tombs of wealthy benefactors. The arkosolium, a pagan form of burial adapted by Christians in the early Byzantine period, remained popular in the following centuries because of the possibility of organizing a richly decorated space inside the church. In the later period, funerary niches were organized both in new additions and in remodeled existing ones. The niches were often decorated with frescoes depicting the deceased and his family communicating with Christ, saints and the Virgin Mary. In the early period monolithic sarcophagi with a sliding lid were used, from the 13th century: prefabricated, composed of parts of old products, with renewed carving. The transition to composite sarcophagi made their use as a container for the body difficult, so burial was carried out in a sealed chamber under the floor of the church, while the panels of the sarcophagus remained visible and had a symbolic function. In addition to dedicatory inscriptions, the traditional decorative elements of sarcophagi were plant ornaments, mythological animals, and birds; in the later period, portraits of the deceased and saints began to appear more frequently. A possible explanation for the change in the attitude towards human images could be the increased interest in ancient sculptural portraits, manifested in the course of a large-scale reconstruction program of Constantinople after its conquest by the Latins in 1261, although one cannot exclude the influence of Romanesque and Gothic art brought by the Crusaders.

Of the sarcophagi of Byzantine emperors that have been preserved to date, four are in the courtyard of the Istanbul Archaeological Museum, two in the Hagia Irene and one in the Nuruosmaniye Mosque.

The existence of numerous literary descriptions of death-related rituals raises the question of their reliability. The problem is especially acute in rural areas. American archaeologist Joseph L. Rife, who studied the funerary practices of the Roman and Byzantine populations of the Isthmus of Corinth, identified the following difficulties The homogeneity of the literary sources, which hides the diversity of funerary practices and forms that actually existed; the rhetorical nature of the available sources, which makes it difficult to analyze them factually; and the representation in literary sources of ideas peculiar to the educated part of society, while funerary practices depended significantly on social and ideological factors. Modern Greek ritual practices may serve as an additional source of information, but the applicability of ethnographic analogy in this case is debatable. Archaeological data refer mainly to the last stage of the funerary ritual and allow us to draw some conclusions about actual burial practices. For example, research in the area of the Hexamilion Wall revealed that in many cases the same tomb could be used for burials from 50 to 100 years old. In the process of preparing a burial, bodies previously placed in the tomb were sometimes removed to create additional space and then carefully re-inserted, keeping the skull orientation to the east. It is likely that members of only one family were buried in a single tomb. In the written sources of the Byzantine epoch the description of the equipment of graves (Ancient Greek τάφοι) does not occur, but the archaeological data allow to assign not less than four of their types. Gravestones could be decorated with crosses, icons and lamps were placed in mausoleums and arkosols.

== Bibliography ==
- Alexakis, A. (2001). Was There Life beyond the Life beyond? Byzantine Ideas on Reincarnation and Final Restoration // Dumbarton Oaks Papers. Vol. 55. Dumbarton Oaks. pp. 155–177. JSTOR 1291816.
- Alexiou, M. (2002). The Ritual Lament in Greek Tradition. Rowman & Littlefield Publishers, Inc. p. 293. ISBN 978-0-7425-0757-9.
- Angold, M. (1995). Church and Society in Byzantium under the Comneni, 1081—1261. Cambridge, Eng.: Cambridge University Press. p. 604.
- Baun, J. (2007). Tales from another Byzantium. Celestial Journey and Local Community in the Medieval Greek Apokrypha. Cambridge University Press. p. 461. ISBN 978-0-521-82395-1.
- Constas, N. (2001). "To Sleep, Perchance to Dream": The Middle State of Souls in Patristic and Byzantine Literature // Dumbarton Oaks Papers. Vol. 55. Dumbarton Oaks. pp. 91–124. JSTOR 1291814.
- Constas, M. (2006). Death and Dying in Byzantium // Byzantine Christianity. Fortress Press. pp. 124–148. ISBN 978-0-8006-9721-1.
- Dennis, G. (2001). Death in Byzantium // Dumbarton Oaks Papers. Vol. 55. Dumbarton Oaks. pp. 1–7. JSTOR 12918091.
- Dunand, F. (2007). Between tradition and innovation: Egyptian funerary practices in late antiquity // Egypt in the Byzantine World 300—700 / Ed. by R. S. Bagnall. Cambridge, Eng.: Cambridge University Press. pp. 163–184. ISBN 978-0521145879.
- Grierson, P. (1962). The Tombs and Obits of the Byzantine Emperors (337-1042) // Dumbarton Oaks Papers. Vol. 16. Dumbarton Oaks. pp. 1–63. doi:10.2307/1291157. ISSN 0070-7546. JSTOR 1291157.
- Grabka, G. (1953). Christian Viaticum: A Study of its Cultural Background // Traditio. Vol. 9. Fordham University Press. pp. 1–43. JSTOR 27830271.
- Herrin, J. (2013). Moving Bones: Evidence of Political Burials from Medieval Constantinople // Unrivaled Influence: Women and Empire in Byzantium. Princeton: Princeton University Press. pp. 208–218. ISBN 9781400845217.
- Kazhdan, Alexander, ed. (1991). The Oxford Dictionary of Byzantium. Oxford and New York: Oxford University Press. ISBN 0-19-504652-8..
- MacCormack, S. G. (1981). Art and Ceremony in the Late Antiquity. Berkeley: University of California Press. p. 417. ISBN 978-1-62139-008-4.
- Maguire, H. (1977). The Depiction of Sorrow in Middle Byzantine Art // Dumbarton Oaks Papers. Vol. 31. Dumbarton Oaks. pp. 123–174. doi:10.2307/1291406. ISSN 0070-7546. JSTOR 1291406.
- Marinis, V. (2016). Death and the Afterlife in Byzantium. The Fate of the Soul in Theology, Liturgy, and Art. Cambridge, Eng.: Cambridge University Press. p. 202. ISBN 9781316488850.
- Rapp, C. (2012). Death at the Byzantine Court: The Emperor and his Family // Death at Court. Harassowitz Verlag: Eds. Spieß K.-H., Warntjes E. pp. 267–286. ISBN 9783447067607.
- Rife, J. L. (2012). The Roman and Byzantine Graves and Human Remains. Havertown: American School of Classical Studies at Athens. p. 512. ISBN 978-0-87661-939-1.
- Talbot, A.-M. (1984). "Old Age in Byzantium // Byzantinische Zeitschrift". Byzantinische Zeitschrift. 77 (2). Walter de Gruyter: 267–278. doi:10.1515/bz-1984-0207. ISSN 0007-7704.
- Samellas, A. (2002). Death in the Eastern Mediterranean (50-600 A.D.): The Christianization of the East: an Interpretation. Tübingen: Mohr Siebeck. p. 378. ISBN 978-3-16-147668-6.

=== In German ===
- Beck, H.-G. (1979). Die Byzantiner und ihr Jenseits. Zur Entstehungsgeschichte einer Mentalität [The Byzantines and their afterlife. The genesis of a mentality] (in German). Verlag der bayerischen Akademie der Wissenschaften. p. 71.

=== In Russian ===
- Aries, F. (1992). Человек перед лицом смерти [A man facing death] (in Russian). Прогресс-акадения. p. 528.
- Sorochan, S. B. (2011). Византия. Парадигмы быта, сознания и культуры [Byzantium. Paradigms of life, consciousness and culture] (in Russian). Майдан: Майдан. p. 953.

=== In French ===
- Dagron, G. (1977). "Le christianisme dans la ville byzantine" [Christianity in the Byzantine city]. Dumbarton Oaks Papers (in French). 31: 1–25. doi:10.2307/1291402. JSTOR 1291402.
- Karlin-Hayter, P. (1991). L'adieu à l'empereur // Byzantion [A farewell to the emperor // Byzantion] (in French). Vol. 61. pp. 112–155. JSTOR 44171111.
