= Évelyne Patlagean =

French historian and Byzantinist

Évelyne Patlagean (20 October 1932 – 11 November 2008) was a French historian and Byzantinist, working on questions of poverty, welfare, gender, the family, and women in Byzantium.

Patlagean's doctoral thesis, entitled Pauvreté économique et pauvreté sociale à Byzance, 4e-7e siècles, was published in 1977. In it, Patlagean developed ideas about inherent inequality in the status of women in the eastern Roman empire. She worked on questions of gender indetermination and transgression, including the seemingly unclear status of the eunuch, and in an important 1976 article, Patlagean opened a new dimension on the masculine inscription of circumscribed gender roles in Byzantine religious orders. Georges Sidéris suggests that Patlagean drew upon then-new insights afforded by the work of the sex and gender researchers Robert J. Stoller and Ann Oakley. Patlagean contributed to the first volume of Paul Veyne's edited Histoire de la vie privée (1987).

Her final book, Un moyen âge grec, although controversial, was generally well received upon its publication in 2007. Patlagean argued forcefully that Byzantium, a field of study generally kept separate from the Latin West in teaching and research (a bifurcation stemming in large part from the Byzantinist's need for facility with Greek), should be viewed as integrally connected with both the idea of the Middle Ages, and with the history of western Europe. Memorial colloquia were held in honour of Évelyne Patlagean on 21 and 22 November 2011, at École normale supérieure Paris and Université de Paris Ouest Nanterre (the former Paris X-Nanterre) respectively.

== Major works ==
- Pauvreté économique et pauvreté sociale à Byzance, 4e-7e siècles. Paris: Mouton, 1977. ISBN 2719308358
- Figures du pouvoir à Byzance: IXe-XIIe siècle. (Collectanea, 13.) Spoleto : Centro italiano di studi sull'alto Medioevo, 2001. ISBN 8879882422
- Structure sociale, famille, chrétienté à Byzance: IVe-XIe siècle. (Collected Studies, CS134.) London: Variorum Reprints, 1981. ISBN 0860780805
- Un moyen âge grec: Byzance, IXe-XVe siècle. Paris: Albin Michel, 2007. ISBN 9782226171108
