= Kover =

Kover can refer to:

- Kövər, village in Yevlakh Rayon, Azerbaijan
- Kövér, Hungarian surname
- Chris Köver, German journalist
- Tina Kover, American translator

== See also ==
- Cover (disambiguation)
