= Ingrid Kögel-Knabner =

German soil scientist

Ingrid Kögel-Knabner (born 1958) is a German soil scientist whose research focuses on soil organic matter, the carbon cycle in soil, and soil-based carbon sequestration. She is a professor at the Technical University of Munich (TUM), chair of soil science, dean of the TUM School of Life Sciences, and a Carl von Linde Senior Fellow in the TUM Institute for Advanced Study.

== Education and career ==
Kögel-Knabner was born in Bayreuth in 1958. After studying at the Richard-Wagner-Gymnasium Bayreuth, she became a student of geoecology at the University of Bayreuth in 1978, soon after its founding in 1975. She earned a diploma there in 1983, and received her doctorate there in 1987 under the supervision of Wolfgang Zech. She completed a habilitation in 1992 with the habilitation thesis Forest soil organic matter: structure and formation.

After working as an assistant in Zech's chair for soil science at Bayreuth until 1992, she obtained a permanent position as Universitätsprofessor for soil science and soil ecology at Ruhr University Bochum in 1992. She was offered a professorship at Martin Luther University Halle-Wittenberg in 1994, but turned down the offer, instead moving in 1995 to her present position at the Technical University of Munich.

== Recognition ==
Kögel-Knabner has been a member of the German National Academy of Sciences Leopoldina since 2001, a member of acatech (the German Academy of Science and Engineering) since 2007, a member of the Bavarian Academy of Sciences and Humanities since 2017, a member of Academia Europaea since 2020, and an international member of the US National Academy of Engineering since 2025, elected "for contributions to mechanisms for soil organic carbon persistence and impacts on soil functions and climate".

She received the Order of Merit of the Federal Republic of Germany in 2013, and the Bavarian Maximilian Order for Science and Art in 2018. She was the 2015 recipient of the Philippe Duchaufour Medal of the European Geosciences Union, and the 2015 recipient of the Emil Ramann Medal of the German Soil Science Society. In 2015, the University of Natural Resources and Life Sciences, Vienna gave her an honorary doctorate. She was the 2019 recipient of the German Environmental Prize of the German Federal Environmental Federation.
