= TUM School of Social Sciences and Technology =

- Established: 2021
- Affiliations: TUM
- Dean: Urs Gasser
- Location: Munich, Bavaria, Germany
- Website: sot.tum.de

The TUM School of Social Sciences and Technology (SOT) is a school of the Technical University of Munich, established in 2021 by the merger of three former departments. As of 2022, it is structured into the Department of Educational Sciences, the Department of Science, Technology and Society, and the Department of Governance.

== Department of Educational Sciences ==
The Department of Educational Sciences conducts teacher training and education research.

=== Chairs ===
As of 2020, the department consists of following chairs:

- Business Education
- Didactics of Chemistry
- Didactics of Computer Science
- Didactics of Life Sciences
- Educational Psychology
- Formal and Informal Learning
- History of Technology
- Information Search, Ecological and Active Learning Research with Children
- Mathematics Education
- Methods in Empirical Educational Research
- Personality and Social Psychology
- Research on Learning and Instruction
- Science Communication
- Teaching and Learning with Digital Media
- Technical Education
- Vocational Education

== Department of Science, Technology and Society ==
The Department of Science, Technology and Society was formed from the former Munich Center for Technology in Society (MCTS) that was established in 2012 as part of the German Universities Excellence Initiative.

As of 2022, research groups at the department include:

- Innovation Research
- Law, Science and Technology
- Philosophy of Science
- History of Technology
- Sociology in Science
- Science and Technology Policy

== Department of Governance ==
The Department of Governance was formed from the former School of Governance that was established in 2017. It focuses on the interactions among politics, economy, society, and technology.

== Institute for Ethics in Artificial Intelligence ==
The Institute for Ethics in Artificial Intelligence (IEAI) is a lab of the TUM School of Social Sciences and Technology.

It was established in 2019 to investigate the ethics of artificial intelligence. Christoph Lütge serves as the founding director.

=== Controversies ===
Facebook has committed to funding the institute with a total of €7.5 million over a five-year period, which has attracted substantial criticism. Although the contractual agreement between the university and the American company remained confidential, the "Facebook Unrestricted Gift Letter" was made public. As per the grant terms, Facebook retains the right to discontinue further funding at any time after its initial payment of $1.5 million without providing any justification. Politicians and the media perceived this as an attempt to suppress unfavorable research findings. The agreement also explicitly mandates that the institute must be headed by founding director Christoph Lütge, who holds an endowed chair in business ethics at TUM, endowed by former Siemens executive Peter Löscher. Should the university desire to appoint a different institute director, Facebook's prior written approval would be necessary.

Christian Kreiss, a professor at Hochschule Aalen, accused the university of becoming an extension of Facebook's marketing arm through this funding arrangement. Alexander Filipović, a professor of media ethics at the Munich School of Philosophy, expressed concern but stated that he trusted the university.

Chris Köver, in an article on Netzpolitik.org, noted that numerous media outlets, ranging "from Tagesschau to Süddeutsche Zeitung", reported on the company's commitment to AI ethics immediately after Sheryl Sandberg announced the partnership. Köver argued that Facebook had effectively purchased a relatively inexpensive image campaign within the German media landscape for 6.6 million euros.

== Rankings ==
University rankings

By subject – Global & National
QS Education & Training 2023	101-150	2-5
THE Education 2023	50	2
QS Social Sciences & Management 2023	177	6

In the QS World University Rankings, TUM is ranked between 101-150 in the world and between 2-5 in Germany in the subject Education & Training. In the Times Higher Education World University Rankings, TUM is ranked 50th in the world and 2nd in Germany in the subject Education.

== See also ==
- Bavarian School of Public Policy
