= TUM School of Engineering and Design =

School at the Technical University of Munich

- Established: 2021
- Affiliations: TUM
- Dean: Christoph Gehlen
- Website: ed.tum.de

The TUM School of Engineering and Design is a school of the Technical University of Munich, established in 2021 by the merger of four departments. As of 2022, it is structured into the Department of Aerospace & Geodesy, the Department of Architecture, the Department of Civil & Environmental Engineering, the Department of Energy & Process Engineering, the Department of Engineering Physics & Computation, the Department of Materials Engineering, the Department of Mechanical Engineering, and the Department of Mobility Systems Engineering.

== Department of Aerospace and Geodesy ==
Department of Aerospace and Geodesy
- Established: 2018; 2021 (current structure)
- Affiliations: TUM
- Head: Chiara Manfletti
- Faculty: 23 professors (2020)
- Students: 941 (2020)
- Location: Ottobrunn, Bavaria
- Website: asg.ed.tum

The Department of Aerospace and Geodesy (ASG) is located in Ottobrunn. It combines the field of aerospace engineering with research in satellite navigation, earth observation and the basic geodetic disciplines.

=== History ===
The Department was founded in 2018, drawing from the Departments of Mechanical Engineering and Civil, Geo and Environmental Engineering.

=== Professorships ===
As of 2020, there are 22 chairs and professorships at the Department:

- Aircraft Design
- Astronautics
- Astronomical and Physical Geodesy
- Autonomous Aerial Systems
- Big Geospatial Data Management
- Carbon Composites
- Cartography
- Communication and Navigation
- Data Science in Earth Observation
- eAviation
- Flight System Dynamics
- Geodesy
- Geodetic Geodynamics
- Geoinformatics
- Helicopter Technology
- Land Management and Land Tenure
- Photogrammetry and Remote Sensing
- Remote Sensing Technology
- Satellite Geodesy
- Space Propulsion
- Sustainable Future Mobility
- Turbomachinery and Flight Propulsion

=== Rankings ===
University rankings

By subject – Global & National
ARWU Aerospace Engineering 2021	17	1
QS Engineering – Mechanical, Aeronautical & Manufacturing 2023	20	2
THE Engineering 2023	20	1
THE Physical Sciences 2023	23	1
ARWU Remote Sensing 2021	5	1

In aerospace engineering, the Academic Ranking of World Universities ranks TUM as 17th in the world and 1st in Germany. In remote sensing, TUM is ranked 5th in the world and 1st in Germany.

In Engineering – Mechanical, Aeronautical & Manufacturing, the QS World University Rankings rank TUM as No. 20 in the world and No. 2 in Germany.

The Times Higher Education World University Rankings do not rank individual subjects, though in engineering in general, TUM is ranked 20th globally and 1st nationally.

== Department of Architecture ==
Department of Architecture
- Established: 1868; 2021 (current structure)
- Head: Regine Keller
- Faculty: 30 professors (2017)
- Students: 1,504 (2020)
- Location: Munich, Bavaria
- Website: arc.ed.tum.de

The Department of Architecture (ARC) is located at the Munich campus.

=== History ===
With the foundation of the Polytechnische Schule München in 1868, architecture was first organized as the "Structural Engineering College". In 1879, Friedrich von Thiersch was appointed Professor of Architecture; his students include Max Berg, Ernst May, Otto Rudolf Salvisberg and Heinrich Tessenow. Hugo Häring and Erich Mendelsohn studied under Theodor Fischer, who was appointed Professor for Design and Urban Planning in 1908.

By 1914, the number of Chairs for Architectural Design had risen to four. During the Weimar Republic, Adolf Abel, Robert Vorhoelzer and German Bestelmeyer were among the leading members of the staff. After the Nazi party seized power, Vorhoelzer was dismissed for "building Bolshevik" and succeeded by Roderich Fick. When Bestelmeyer died, he was replaced by Julius Schulte-Frohlinde, a staunch supporter of Nazism.

After the war, teaching resumed in 1946. Robert Vorhoelzer returned to his post and organized the rebuilding of the Department. By 1968, the number of chairs increased to 17, and the number of students to 850.

With the introduction of the Bologna Process, the Department has since adopted Bachelor's and Master's programs.

=== Professorships ===
As of 2020, the department consists of 32 professorships:

- Architectural Informatics
- Architectural Design and Building Envelope
- Architectural Design and Conception
- Architectural Design and Construction
- Architectural Design, Rebuilding and Conservation
- Architectural Design and Participation
- Architectural Design and Timber Construction
- Building Construction and Material Science
- Building History, Building Archaeology and Conservation
- Building Realization and Robotics
- Building Technology and Climate
- Responsive Design
- Digital Fabrication
- Energy Efficient and Sustainable Design and Building
- Green Technologies in Landscape Architecture
- History of Architecture and Curatorial Practice
- Industrial Design
- Landscape Architecture and Industrial Landscape
- Landscape Architecture and Public Space
- Landscape Architecture and Regional Open Space
- Participatory Technology Design
- Recent Building Heritage Conservation
- Restoration, Art Technology and Conservation Science
- Spatial Arts and Lighting Design
- Structural Design
- Sustainable Urbanism
- Theory and History of Architecture, Art and Design
- Urban Architecture
- Urban Design and Housing
- Urban Design
- Urban Development
- Visual Arts

=== Rankings ===
University rankings

By subject – Global & National
QS Architecture & Built Environment 2023	24	2

CHE Ranking 2020 – National
Architecture
Overall study situation	● 1.8
Support in the study entry phase	● 7/12 pts.
Scientific-artistical orientation	● 1.9

The 2023 QS World University Rankings have rated the TUM Department of Architecture as the 24th best architecture school in the world and the 2nd best in Germany.

In the national 2020 CHE University Ranking, the department is rated in the top group for the majority of criteria, including overall study situation and support in studies.

== Department of Civil & Environmental Engineering ==
Department of Civil & Environmental Engineering
- Head: Stefan Winter
- Faculty: 45 professors (2020)
- Students: 3,731 (2020)
- Location: Garching, Bavaria
- Website: cee.ed.tum.de

The Department of Civil & Environmental Engineering (CEE) is located at the Munich campus.

=== Chairs ===
The department consists of four focus areas and associated members:

- Construction
  - Building Physics
  - Energy Efficient and Sustainable Design and Building
  - Soil Mechanics and Foundation Engineering, Rock Mechanics and Tunneling
  - Timber Structures and Building Construction
  - Concrete and Masonry Structures
  - Metal Structures
  - Mineral Construction Materials
  - Materials Science and Testing
  - Non-destructive Testing
- Mobility & Transportation Systems
  - Traffic Engineering and Control
  - Road, Railway and Airfield Construction
  - Transportation Systems Engineering
  - Urban Structure and Transport Planning
  - Modeling Spatial Mobility
- Modeling – Simulation – Processes
  - Construction Management
  - Structural Mechanics
  - Computational Mechanics
  - Computational Modeling and Simulation
  - Hydromechanics
  - Real Estate Management
  - Engineering Risk Analysis
  - Structural Analysis
- Hydro- and Geosciences
  - Geothermal Technologies
  - Landslide Research
  - Hydrogeology
  - Hydrology and River Basin Management
  - Engineering Geology
  - Urban Water Systems Engineering
  - Hydraulic and Water Resources Engineering
- Associated Members
  - Hydrochemistry
  - Strategic Landscape Planning and Management
  - Construction Chemistry
  - Wood Technology
  - Environmental Sensing and Modeling
  - Digital Fabrication
  - Cartography
  - Geodesy
  - Geoinformatics
  - Land Management
  - Astronomical and Physical Geodesy
  - Satellite Geodesy
  - Geodetic Geodynamics
  - Photogrammetry and Remote Sensing
  - Remote Sensing Technology
  - Signal Processing in Earth Observation

=== Rankings ===
University rankings

By subject – Global & National
QS Civil & Structural Engineering 2023	=40	1
ARWU Civil Engineering 2021	201-300	2-5
QS Environmental Sciences 2023	70	2
ARWU Environmental Science & Engineering 2021	15	1
THE Engineering 2023	20	1

CHE Ranking 2020 – National
Civil Engineering (B. / M.)
Overall study situation	● 2.2	● 2.1
Support in studies	● 2.4	● 2.5
Graduations in appropriate time	● 82.8%	● 59.1%
Doctorates per professor	● 1.3
Geoscience
Overall study situation	● 2.0
Support in the study entry phase	● 12/14 pts.
Contact with work environment	● 5/12 pts.
Third party funds per academic	● 84.6

In civil engineering, QS ranks TUM as No. 40 in the world and No. 1 in Germany in 2022. ARWU ranks TUM within No. 201–300 in the world and No. 2-5 in Germany.

In the environmental sciences, QS ranks TUM as No. 70 in the world and No. 2 in Germany. ARWU ranks TUM as No. 15 in the world and No. 1 in Germany.

The Times Higher Education World University Rankings does not rank individual subjects, though in engineering in general, TUM is ranked 20th globally and 1st nationally.

== Department of Mechanical Engineering ==
Department of Mechanical Engineering
- Established: 1868; 2021 (current structure)
- Head: Klaus Bengler
- Faculty: 38 professors (2019)
- Students: 4,208 (2020)
- Location: Garching
- Website: mec.ed.tum.de

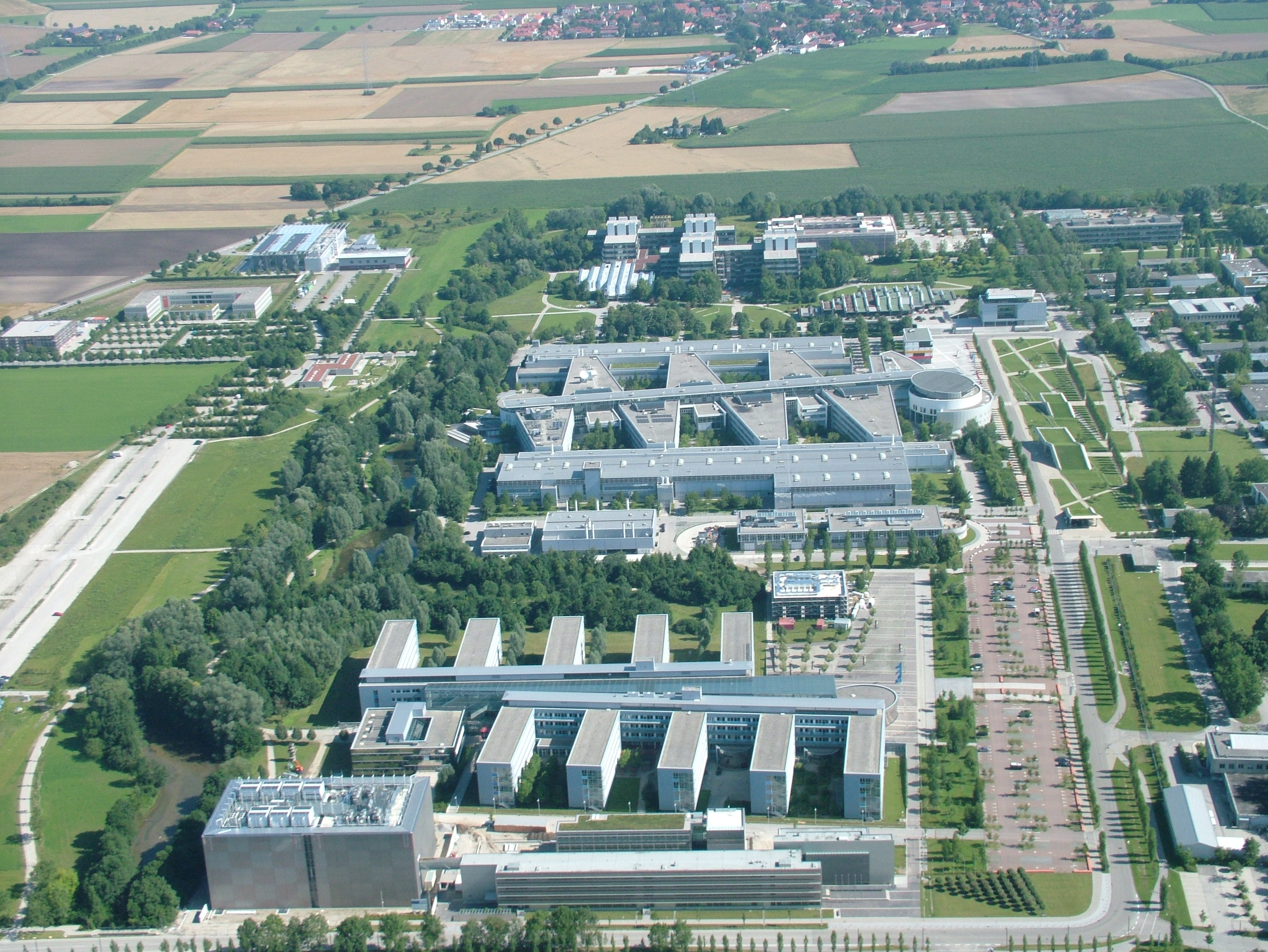
The building of the TUM Department of Mechanical Engineering (in the center) is one of the largest buildings on the Garching campus.

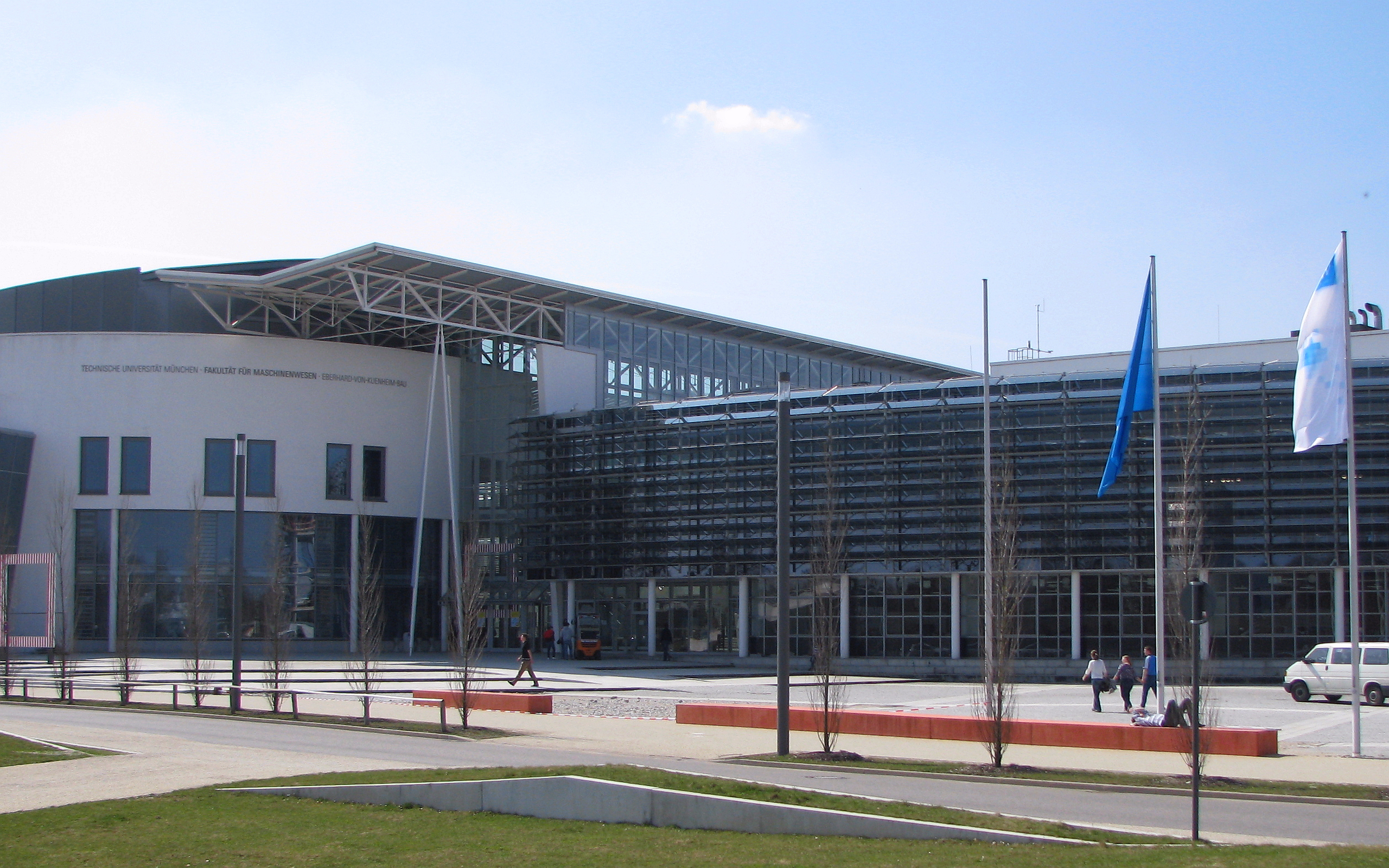
Entrance to the Department's building

The Department of Mechanical Engineering (MEC) is located in Garching.

=== History ===
==== 19th century ====
Mechanical engineering was one of the original departments of the newly founded Polytechnische Schule München in 1868, then called the Mechanical-Technical Department. Johann Bauschinger was professor for Technical Mechanics and Graphical Statics. In 1871, he founded the Mechanical-Technical Laboratory. He was succeeded by August Föppl in 1894.

Carl von Linde, who held the Chair of Theoretical Machine Science, established the Laboratory of Machine Science in 1875. Moritz Schröter, a distinguished expert in the field of technical thermodynamics, succeeded him in 1879. In 1902, von Linde returned as associate professor of Applied Thermodynamics. On his initiative, the Laboratory for Technical Physics was established.

In 1880, Rudolf Diesel graduated with the best marks since the university was established. His invention of the Diesel engine was a groundbreaking innovation, despite his initial calculations about the degree of efficiency being far too optimistic.

==== 20th century ====
In 1901, the first chair of electrical engineering was established at the department. Though initially viewed as a part of mechanical engineering, it grew increasingly more independent. In the 1940s, the department's name was changed to Department of Mechanical and Electrical Engineering, and by 1974, electrical engineering was separated into a new department.

Willy Messerschmitt graduated from the department in 1923. He established the Messerschmitt Flugzeugbau GmbH while still a student, which would later become the Messerschmitt AG in 1938. In 1930, he was granted a lectureship on the construction and design of aircraft, and in 1937, he was appointed honorary professor.

In Nazi Germany, the university was brought into line, partly by force, partly by conviction, and partly out of anticipatory obedience. Jewish members and those with politically undesirable views were expelled.

During World War II, the department conducted large-scale research in support of the war effort, for example in the fields of aircraft design, torpedo propulsion, petrol injection and substitute fuels for car and aircraft engines.

After the war, teaching resumed in 1946, though denazification expelled 13 of 24 lecturers, four of whom which were reinstated by 1953. The chairs for aviation research were shut down and did not operate again until the Paris Agreements ended Allied occupation of Germany.

In 1951, Gustav Niemann established the Chair of Machine Elements. In 1967, the founding of the Institute of Machine Tools and Industrial Engineering instigated a shift to research to information technology and production engineering.

By 1990, almost 5,000 students were enrolled at the Department of Mechanical Engineering. In 1997, the department relocated to a new 60,000 m^{2} building on the Garching campus.

==== 21st century ====
In 2018, aerospace and geodesy at TUM became a separate Department of Aerospace and Geodesy.

=== Chairs ===
As of 2020, there are 39 chairs at the Department:

- Aerodynamics and Fluid Mechanics
- Applied Mechanics
- Automatic Control
- Automation and Information Systems
- Automotive Technology
- Biochemical Engineering
- Biomechanics
- Bioseparation Engineering
- Computational Mechanics
- Continuum Mechanics
- Cyber-Physical Systems in Production Engineering
- Energy Systems
- Ergonomics
- Flow Control and Aeroacoustics
- Industrial Management and Assembly Technologies
- Internal Combustion Engines
- Laser Based Additive Manufacturing
- Machine Elements
- Machine Tools and Manufacturing Technology
- Materials Engineering of Additive Manufacturing
- Materials Handling, Material Flow, Logistics
- Materials Science and Mechanics of Materials
- Mechanics and High Performance Computing
- Medical Materials and Implants
- Metal Forming and Casting
- Micro Technology and Medical Device Technology
- Multiscale Modeling of Fluid Materials
- Non-Destructive Testing
- Nuclear Technology
- Plant and Process Technology
- Plasma Material Interaction
- Product Development and Lightweight Design
- Production and Technology in Media
- Sport Equipment and Materials
- Systems Biotechnology
- Thermodynamics
- Thermo-Fluid Dynamics
- Vibroacoustics of Vehicles and Machines
- Wind Energy

=== Rankings ===
University rankings

By subject – Global & National
QS Engineering – Mechanical, Aeronautical & Manufacturing 2023	20	2
ARWU Mechanical Engineering 2021	101-150	4-6
QS Materials Science 2023	31	4
THE Engineering 2023	20	1

CHE Ranking 2020 – National
Mechanical Engineering (B. / M.)
Overall study situation	● 1.9	● 1.8
Study organisation	● 1.7	● 1.7
Support in the study entry phase	● 9/14 pts.
Graduations in appropriate time	● 89.4%	● 50.0%
International orientation	–	● 8/9 pts.
Doctorates per professor	● 4.0

In Engineering – Mechanical, Aeronautical & Manufacturing, the QS World University Rankings rank TUM as No. 21 in the world and No. 2 in Germany. The Academic Ranking of World Universities ranks the department within No. 101–150 in the world and No. 4–6 in Germany.

The Times Higher Education World University Rankings does not rank individual subjects, though in engineering in general, TUM is ranked 20th globally and 1st nationally.

=== Notable people ===
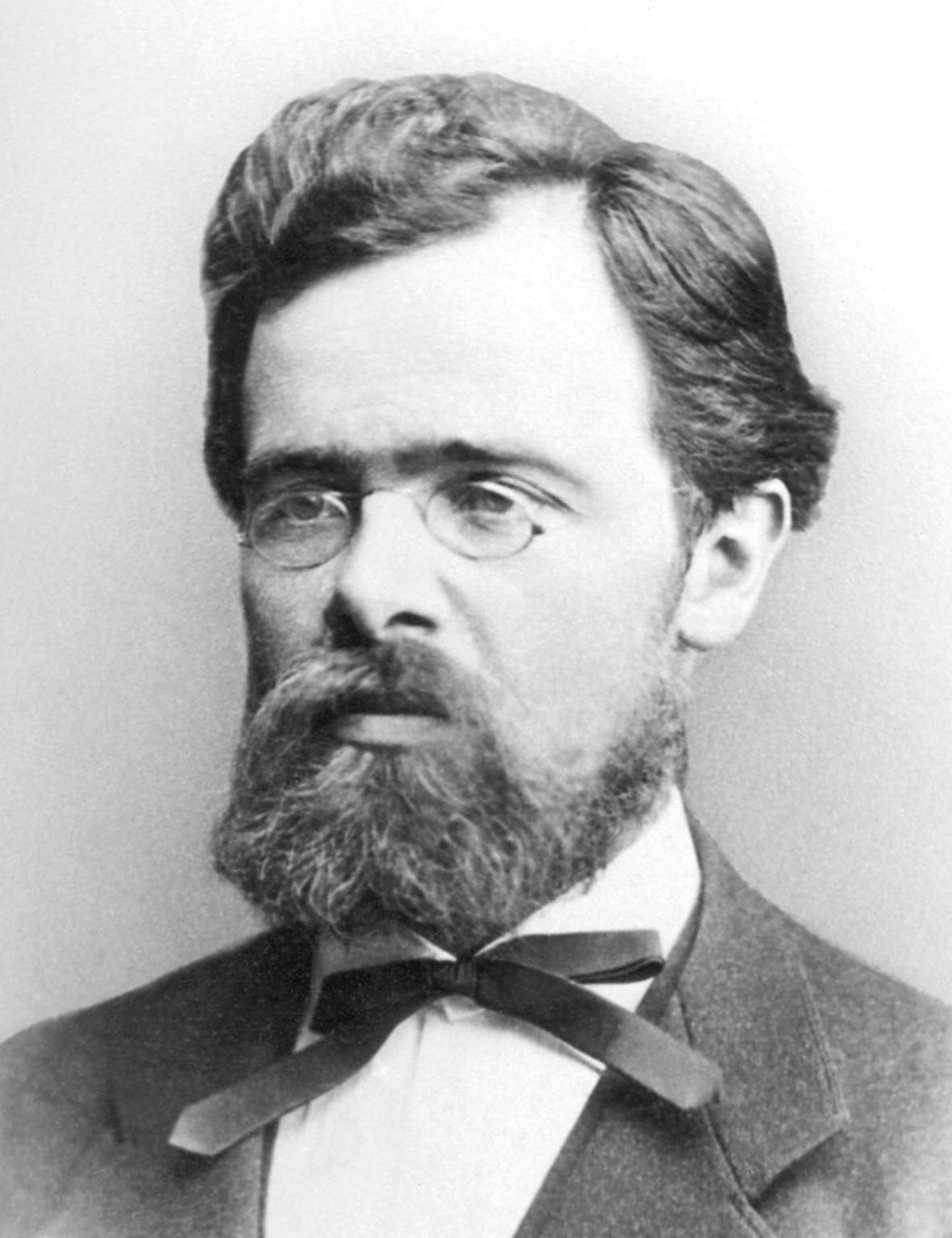
Carl von Linde, Chair of Theoretical Machine Science from 1875, discovered the refrigeration cycle that led to the development of the modern refrigerator.

Notable people include:

- Rudolf Diesel, inventor of the Diesel engine
- Claude Dornier, airplane designer
- Carl von Linde, discoverer of the refrigeration cycle
- Willy Messerschmitt, aircraft designer, known for the Messerschmitt fighters
- Oskar von Miller, engineer, founder of the Deutsches Museum
