= Christoph Lütge =

German philosopher and economist (born 10 November 1969)

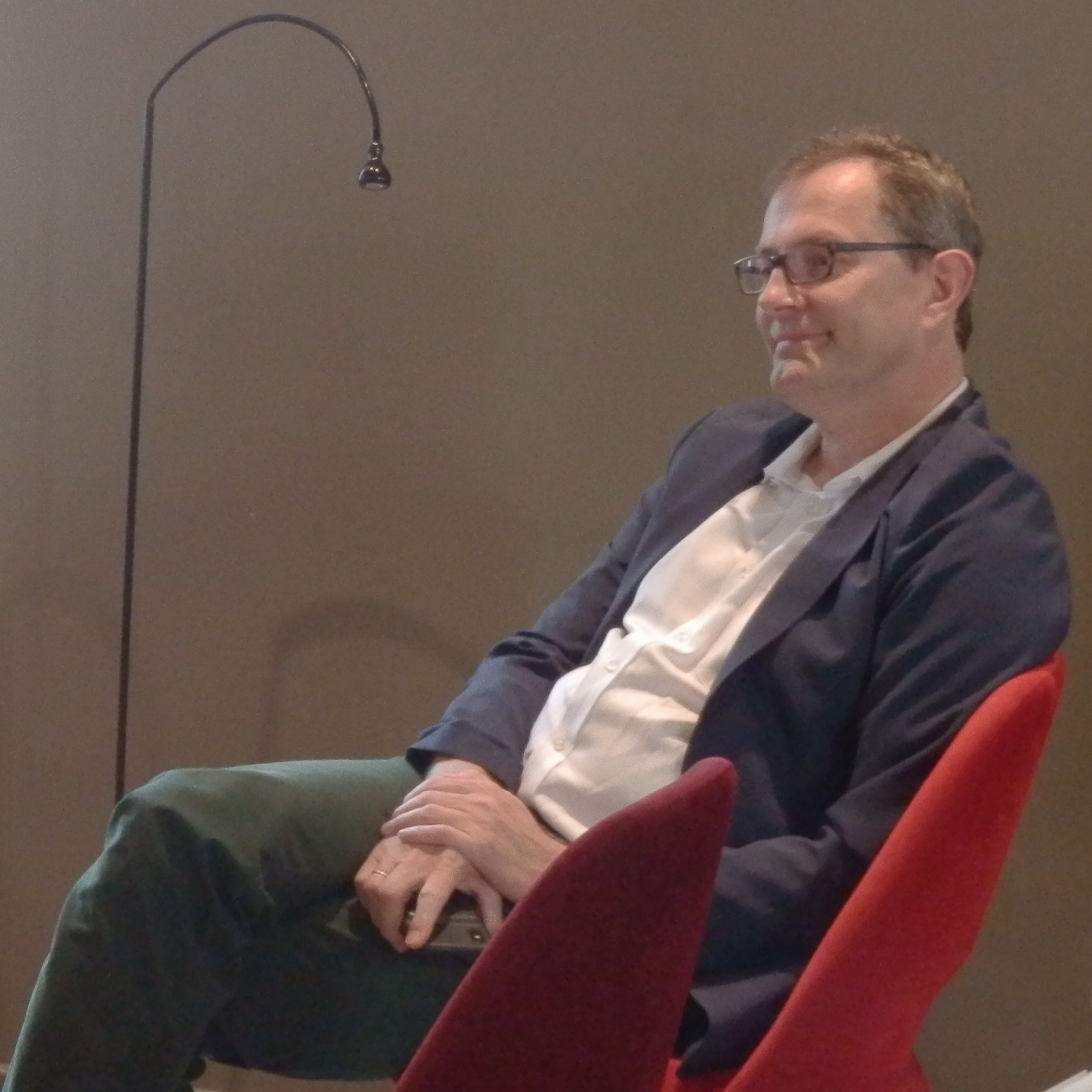
Christoph Lütge (2021)

Christoph Lütge (born 10 November 1969) is a German philosopher and economist notable for his work on business ethics, AI ethics, experimental ethics and political philosophy. He is full professor of business ethics at the Technical University of Munich and director of its Institute for Ethics in Artificial Intelligence.

== Academic career ==
After studying philosophy and business informatics in Braunschweig, Göttingen and Paris, Lütge was a PhD student at Technische Universität Berlin and TU Braunschweig from 1997 to 1999. He was a visiting scholar at the University of Pittsburgh in 1997 and research fellow at the University of California, San Diego in 1998. In 1999, he received his doctorate in philosophy and became a research assistant at LMU Munich. He was visiting professor at Venice International University in 2003. From 2004, Lütge was assistant professor at the department of philosophy of LMU Munich, from which he also received his habilitation in 2005. Christoph Lütge was acting professor at Witten/Herdecke University from 2007 to 2008 and at TU Braunschweig from 2008 to 2010. Since August 2010, he holds the newly created Peter Löscher Endowed Chair of Business Ethics at Technical University of Munich. In 2019, Lütge became director of the new Institute for Ethics in Artificial Intelligence (IEAI) at Technical University of Munich.

== Philosophy ==
=== Business ethics ===
In his work on business ethics, Lütge advocates a contractarian approach termed "order ethics". This approach focuses on the institutional and order framework of a society and its economy. Both formal and informal order elements are analyzed in order ethics, which especially highlights the relation of competition and ethics and reaches out into thematic fields such as Corporate Social Responsibility and Diversity.

=== Political philosophy ===
In his work on political philosophy, "Order Ethics or Moral Surplus: What Holds a Society Together?", Lütge takes on a fundamental problem of contemporary political philosophy and ethics. He questions the often implicit assumption of many contemporary political philosophers according to which a society needs its citizens to adopt some shared basic qualities, views or capabilities (here termed a moral surplus). Lütge examines the respective theories of, among others, Jürgen Habermas, John Rawls, David Gauthier, James M. Buchanan, and Kenneth Binmore with a focus on their respective moral surpluses. He finds that each moral surplus is either not necessary for the stability of societies or cannot remain stable when faced with opposing incentives. Binmore's idea of empathy is the only one that is, at least partly, not confronted with this dilemma. Lütge provides an alternative view termed "order ethics", which weakens the necessary assumptions for modern societies and basically only relies on mutual advantages as the fundamental basis of society.

== Distinctions and awards ==
In 2007, Lütge received a Heisenberg Fellowship from the German Research Foundation. In the past, he has been a Member of the Senate and the Advisory Council of the Bavarian School of Public Policy, as well as a Member of the Ethics Advisory Board of the European Medical Information Framework (EMIF), Member of the advisory board of the Centre for Governance, Leadership and Global Responsibility of Leeds Metropolitan University and Vice chairman of the audit committee of the Bavarian Construction Industry Association. Among others, Lütge has held visiting positions at the Berkman Klein Center for Internet and Society of Harvard University (2019), National Taipei University (2015) and Kyoto (2015). In 2016, he was appointed by Federal Minister of Transport and Digital Infrastructure Alexander Dobrindt to serve on the German government's Ethics Commission on Autonomous Driving. In 2017, Lütge was elected into the executive committee of the International Society for Business, Ethics and Economics (ISBEE). From 2018 to 2020, he was Liaison Professor of the Studienstiftung des deutschen Volkes (German Academic Scholarship Foundation) and, since 2018, Member of the Scientific Board of AI4People. Since 2019, Lütge is appointed as External Member of the Karel Čapek Center for Values in Science and Technology (Czech Academy of Sciences, Prague). Since 2021, he is also a member of the Academic Committee of the Institute for AI International Governance of Tsinghua University.

In 2022, he was ranked by Tyto as the 23rd most influential person in the German tech sector.

== Academic bodies reviewer ==
Lütge has done reviewing work for the Royal Swedish Academy of Sciences, Netherlands Organization for Scientific Research, Israel Science Foundation, Swiss National Science Foundation, German Research Foundation (DFG), German Council of Science and Humanities (Wissenschaftsrat), Society for Business Ethics, German National Academic Foundation, German Academic Exchange Service (DAAD) and German Federal Environmental Foundation.

== Controversy ==
In January 2019, Facebook made a five-year contribution (with US$7.5 million.) to help launch the IEAI led by Lütge. The contractual agreement between the university and the company remained confidential, but controversial parts of the agreement became public through the media. According to this agreement, Facebook retains the right to discontinue further funding at any time after its initial payment and explicitly mandates that Christoph Lütge must head the institute unless Facebook approves a different head.

In 2021, Lütge was fired from the Bavarian Ethics Council by the Bavarian cabinet under the direction of Markus Söder. According to a spokesman for the state government in Munich, Lütge was fired because of repeated public statements incompatible with the responsibilities of his position. Lütge had publicly criticised lockdowns during the COVID crisis. According to the council's chair, Lütge had been evoking the impression that his personal opinion had been authorized by the council. Lütge has rejected this claim in interviews.

== Major books ==
- Business Ethics: An Economically Informed Perspective, Oxford University Press, Oxford 2021 (with Matthias Uhl), ISBN 978-0-19-886477-6.
- An Introduction to Ethics in Robotics and AI, Dordrecht: Springer, 2021, (ed. with C. Bartneck, A. Wagner and S. Welsh), ISBN 978-3-030-51109-8. Free OpenAccess download here: https://link.springer.com/book/10.1007/978-3-030-51110-4
- The Praxis of Diversity, Basingstoke: Macmillan 2020, (ed., with C. Lütge, and M. Faltermeier), ISBN 978-3-030-26077-4.
- Ethik in KI und Robotik, Munich: Hanser Verlag, 2019, (ed. with C. Bartneck, A. Wagner and S. Welsh), ISBN 978-3-446-46227-4.
- The Ethics of Competition: How a Competitive Society is Good for All. Cheltenham: Elgar 2019, ISBN 978-1-78897-298-7.
- The Honorable Merchant – Between Modesty and Risk-Taking: Intercultural and Literary Aspects, Heidelberg/New York: Springer 2019, (ed., with C. Strosetzki), ISBN 978-3-030-04350-6.
- The Idea of Justice in Literature, Heidelberg/New York: Springer 2018, (ed., with H. Kabashima, S. Liu, A. de Prada Garcia), ISBN 978-3-658-21995-6.
- Order Ethics: An Ethical Framework for the Social Market Economy, Heidelberg/New York: Springer 2016, (ed., with N. Mukerji), ISBN 978-3-319-33149-2.
- Order Ethics or Moral Surplus: What Holds a Society Together?, Lanham: Lexington 2015, ISBN 978-0-7391-9867-4.
- Experimental Ethics: Toward an Empirical Moral Philosophy, Basingstoke: Palgrave Macmillan 2014, (ed., with H. Rusch and M. Uhl), ISBN 978-1-137-40979-9.
- Ethik des Wettbewerbs: Über Konkurrenz und Moral. München: Beck 2014, ISBN 978-3-406-66964-4.
- Business Ethics and Risk Management, Heidelberg/New York: Springer 2014, (ed., with J. Jauernig), ISBN 978-94-007-7441-4.
- Handbook of the Philosophical Foundations of Business Ethics. Heidelberg/New York: Springer 2013 (ed.), ISBN 978-94-007-1495-3.
- Einführung in die Wirtschaftsethik. 3rd ed., Münster: LIT 2013 (with K. Homann), ISBN 978-3-8258-7758-3.
- Wirtschaftsethik ohne Illusionen: Ordnungstheoretische Reflexionen. Tübingen: Mohr Siebeck 2012, ISBN 978-3-16-151782-2.
- Entscheidung und Urteil. Göttingen: Vandenhoeck und Ruprecht 2009 (with H. Jungermann), ISBN 978-3-525-40419-5.
- Corporate Citizenship, Contractarianism and Ethical Theory: On Philosophical Foundations of Business Ethics. Aldershot/London: Ashgate 2008 (ed., with J. Conill and T. Schönwälder-Kuntze), ISBN 978-0-7546-7383-5.
- Globalisation and Business Ethics. Aldershot/London: Ashgate 2007 (ed., with K. Homann and P. Koslowski), ISBN 978-0-7546-4817-8.
- Was hält eine Gesellschaft zusammen? Ethik im Zeitalter der Globalisierung. Tübingen: Mohr Siebeck 2007, ISBN 978-3-16-149408-6.
- Ökonomische Wissenschaftstheorie. Würzburg: Königshausen und Neumann 2001, ISBN 978-3-8260-2017-9.
