= TUM School of Life Sciences =

- Type: Public
- Established: 1970 (campus); 2000 (current organization)
- Academic affiliation: Technical University of Munich
- Dean: Prof. Ingrid Kögel-Knabner
- Academic staff: 100 professors (2025)
- Students: 4,600 students (2025); 1,000 doctoral students (2025)
- Location: Freising, Bavaria, Germany
- Website: ls.tum.de

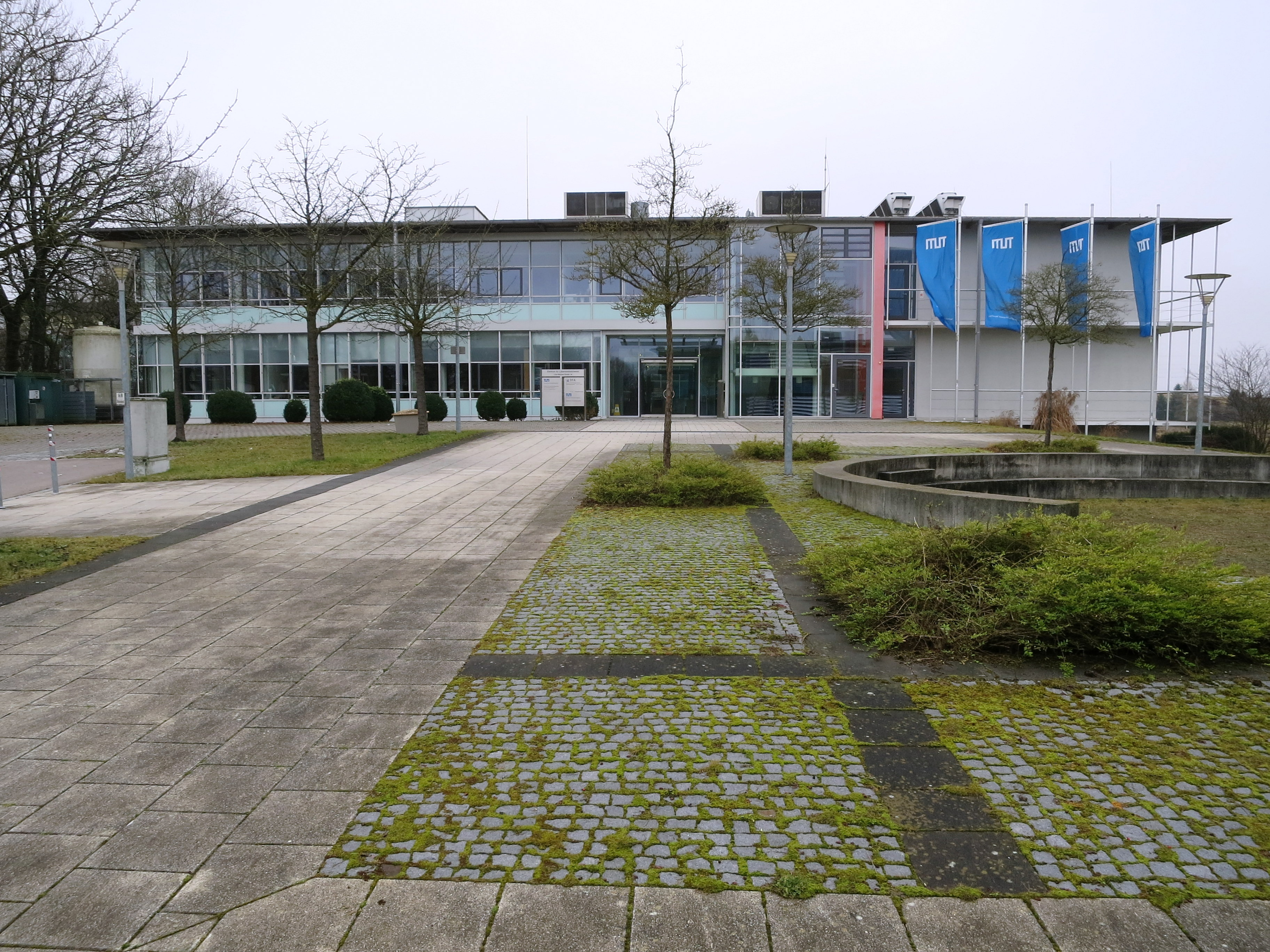
The building of the food chemistry department on the Weihenstephan campus

The TUM School of Life Sciences (LS or formerly TUM WZW) is a school of the Technical University of Munich, located at its Weihenstephan campus in Freising. It encompasses the life sciences, in particular biology, agricultural science, food technology, landscape architecture, biotechnology, and nutrition.

== History ==
The School of Life Sciences can be traced back to the "School of Agriculture" and the "Central Tree Nursery for the Electorate Weihenstephan", founded in 1803. The first lecturer was Max Schönleutner. In 1855, the "Bavarian Agricultural Experiment Institute" was founded by Justus von Liebig, who made major contributions to agricultural and biological chemistry. In 1895, these institutes became the "Royal Bavarian Academy for Agriculture and Beer Brewing", and in 1928–1930 were merged into the Technische Hochschule München, which would later become the Technical University of Munich.

The campus in Weihenstephan was founded in 1970. In 1998, the TUM Department of Biology relocated to Weihenstephan, and in 1999, the Department of Forestry of LMU Munich was handed over to TUM.

In 2000, the TUM departments in Weihenstephan were consolidated into the Wissenschaftszentrum für Ernährung, Landnutzung und Umwelt (Center of Life and Food Sciences). In 2020, it became the present School of Life Sciences.

== Departments ==
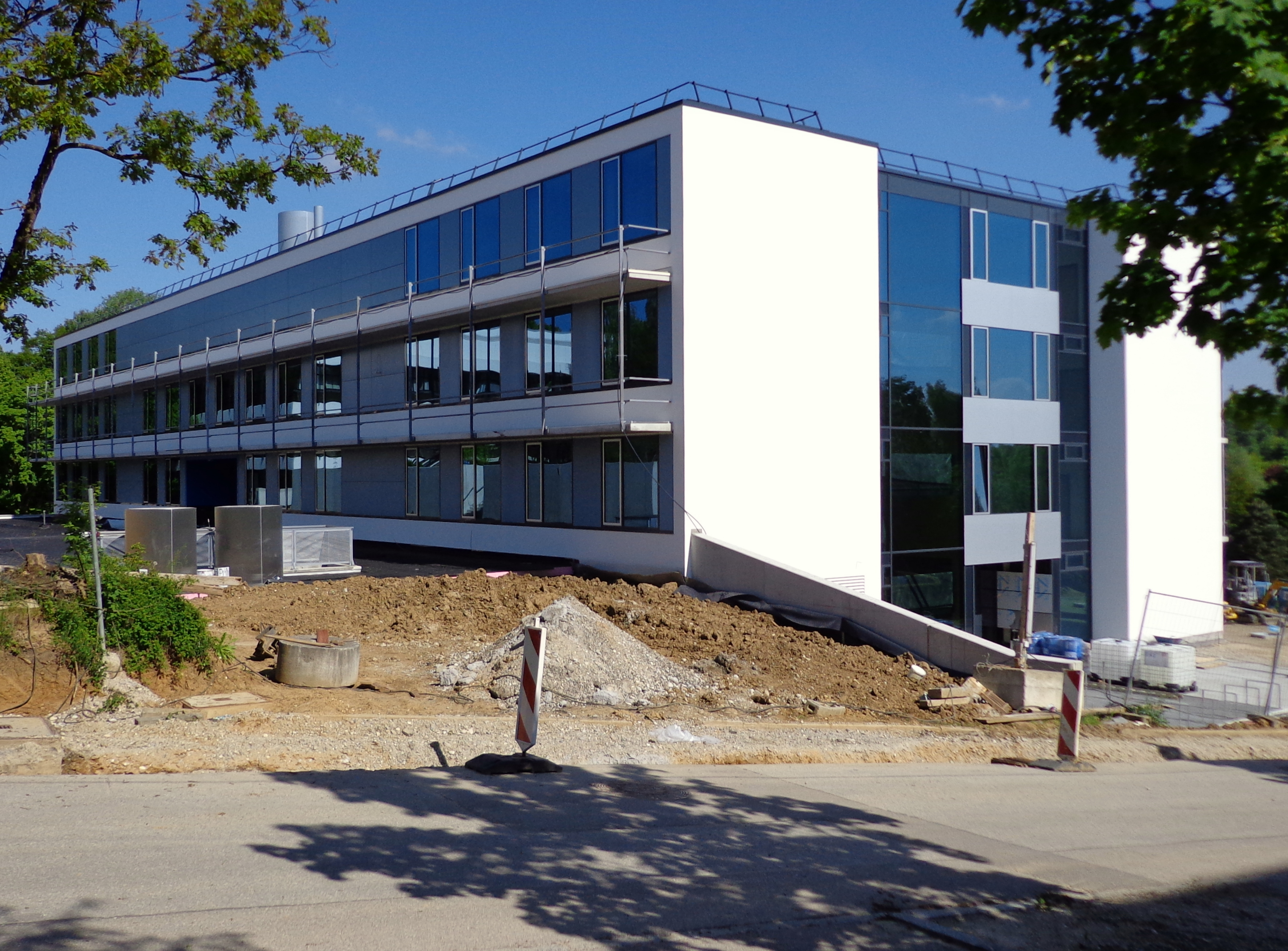
The World Agricultural Systems Center, research center for agricultural science

The TUM School of Life Sciences is structured into three research departments:

=== Molecular Life Sciences ===
- Animal Breeding
- Animal Hygiene
- Animal Nutrition
- Animal Physiology and Immunology
- Biochemical Plant Pathology
- Bioinformatics
- Biological Chemistry
- Biopolymer Chemistry
- Biotechnology of horticultural crops
- Biotechnology of Natural Products
- Botany
- Computational Neurosciences
- Crop Physiology
- Developmental Genetics
- Experimental Bioinformatics
- Experimental Genetics
- Food Chemistry and Molecular Sensory Science
- Human Biology
- Intestinal Microbiome
- Livestock Biotechnology
- Metabolic Programming
- Microbial Ecology
- Microbiology
- Molecular Nutritional Medicine
- Neuronal Control of Metabolism
- Nutrition and Immunology
- Nutritional Systems Biology
- Peptide Biochemistry
- Phytopathology
- Plant Breeding
- Plant Developmental Biology
- Plant Genetics
- Plant Systems Biology
- Population Epigenetics and Epigenomics
- Protein Modelling
- Proteomics and Bioanalytics
- Reproductive Biotechnology
- Technical Microbiology
- Zoology

=== Life Science Systems ===
- Aquatic Systems Biology
- Atmospheric Environmental Research
- Ecoclimatology
- Ecological Cultivation
- Ecosystem Dynamics and Forest Management in Mountain Landscapes
- Forest and Agroforest Systems
- Forest Growth and Yield Science
- Forest Management
- Forest Nutrition and Water Resources
- Geomorphology and Soil Science
- Land Surface-Atmosphere Interactions
- Plant Biodiversity
- Plant-Insect Interactions
- Plant Nutrition
- Population Genetics
- Restoration Ecology
- Soil Science
- Strategic Landscape Planning and Management
- Terrestrial Ecology
- Urban Productive Ecosystems

=== Life Science Engineering ===
- Agricultural Systems Engineering
- Agrimechatronics
- Analytical Food Chemistry
- Biothermodynamics
- Brewing and Beverage Technology
- Digital Agriculture
- Fluid Dynamics of Complex Biosystems
- Food and Bioprocess Engineering
- Fungal Biotechnology in Wood Science
- Precision Agriculture
- Process Systems Engineering
- Wood Science
- Wood Technology

== Rankings ==
University rankings

By subject – Global & National
THE Life Sciences 2023	35	3
QS Biological Sciences 2023	=50	3
ARWU Biological Sciences 2021	76-100	5-9
ARWU Biotechnology 2021	49	1
QS Agriculture & Forestry 2023	33	3
ARWU Agricultural Sciences 2021	38	2

CHE Ranking 2020 – National
Biology
Overall study situation	● 1.9
Support in the study entry phase	● 10/12 pts.
Coursed offered	● 2.6
Laboratory internships	● 2.2

The Times Higher Education World University Rankings ranks life sciences at TUM as 35th in the world and 3rd in Germany, after Heidelberg University and LMU Munich.

In biology, the department is ranked No. 50 in the world and No. 3 in Germany in the QS World University Rankings. In the Academic Ranking of World Universities, it ranks No. 76-100 in the world and No. 5-9 in Germany. In the national 2020 CHE University Ranking, the department is rated in the top group for overall study situation, study organization, and infrastructure.

In biotechnology, ARWU ranks TUM as No. 49 in the world and No. 1 in Germany.

In agricultural science, the department is ranked 27th in the world and 2nd in Germany in the QS World University Rankings, trailing the University of Hohenheim. In the Academic Ranking of World Universities, it ranks No. 38 in the world and No. 2 in Germany.

In food science, ARWU ranks TUM as No. 37 in the world and No. 1 in Germany.
