= TUM School of Management =

Business school of the Technical University of Munich

- Type: Public
- Established: 1974; 2002 (current organization)
- Accreditation: Triple accreditation
- Affiliations: Technical University of Munich (TUM)
- Dean: Christoph Kaserer
- Faculty: 42 professors (2019)
- Students: 5,806 (2020)
- Location: Munich, Bavaria, Germany
- Website: mgt.tum.de

The TUM School of Management is the business school of the Technical University of Munich, located on its Munich campus.

It is triple accredited by the European Quality Improvement System (EQUIS), the Association to Advance Collegiate Schools of Business (AACSB), and the Association of MBAs (AMBA).

== History ==
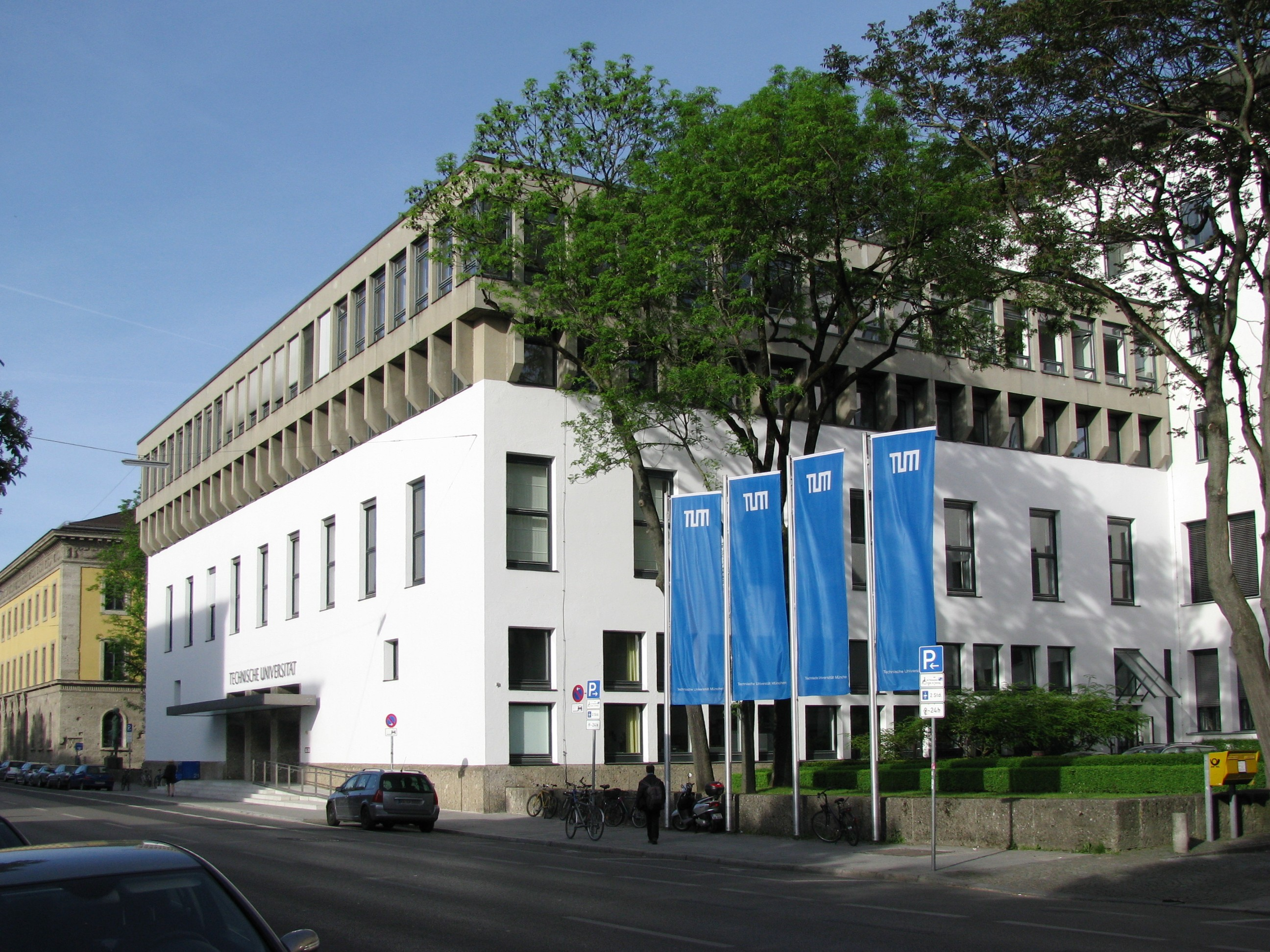
Entrance to the Main Campus in Munich

In 1974, a Faculty for Business Administration and Social Sciences was established at TUM. In 2002, the TUM School of Management was founded by splitting up the Faculty for Economic and Social Sciences and integrating the Department of Business and Social Sciences at Weihenstephan.

== Research ==
The main research areas of the Department are:

- Innovation and Entrepreneurship
- Marketing, Strategy and Leadership
- Operations and Supply chain management
- Finance and Accounting
- Economics and Policy

== Rankings ==
University rankings

By subject – Global & National
QS Business & Management Studies 2023	=76	2
THE Business and economics 2023	33	1
ARWU Business Administration 2021	151-200	4-5
QS Management (Master's) 2023	26	2
ARWU Management 2021	101-150	1-2
QS Accounting & Finance 2023	151-200	5

CHE Ranking 2020 – National
Business Administration (B. / M.)
Overall study situation	● 1.8	● 1.4
Research orientation	● 2.0	● 1.6
Support in the study entry phase	● 10/14 pts.
Coursed offered	● 1.7	● 1.5
Teacher support	● 2.2	● 1.8
Doctorates per professor	● 1.3
Publications per professor	● top group

The TUM School of Management has been rated as one of the best business schools in Germany.

In the national 2020 CHE University Ranking, the department is rated in the top group for the majority of criteria, including courses offered and research orientation.
