= Zentrale Hochschulsportanlage =

University sports facility in Munich, Germany

Coordinates: 48.1804°N 11.5443°E

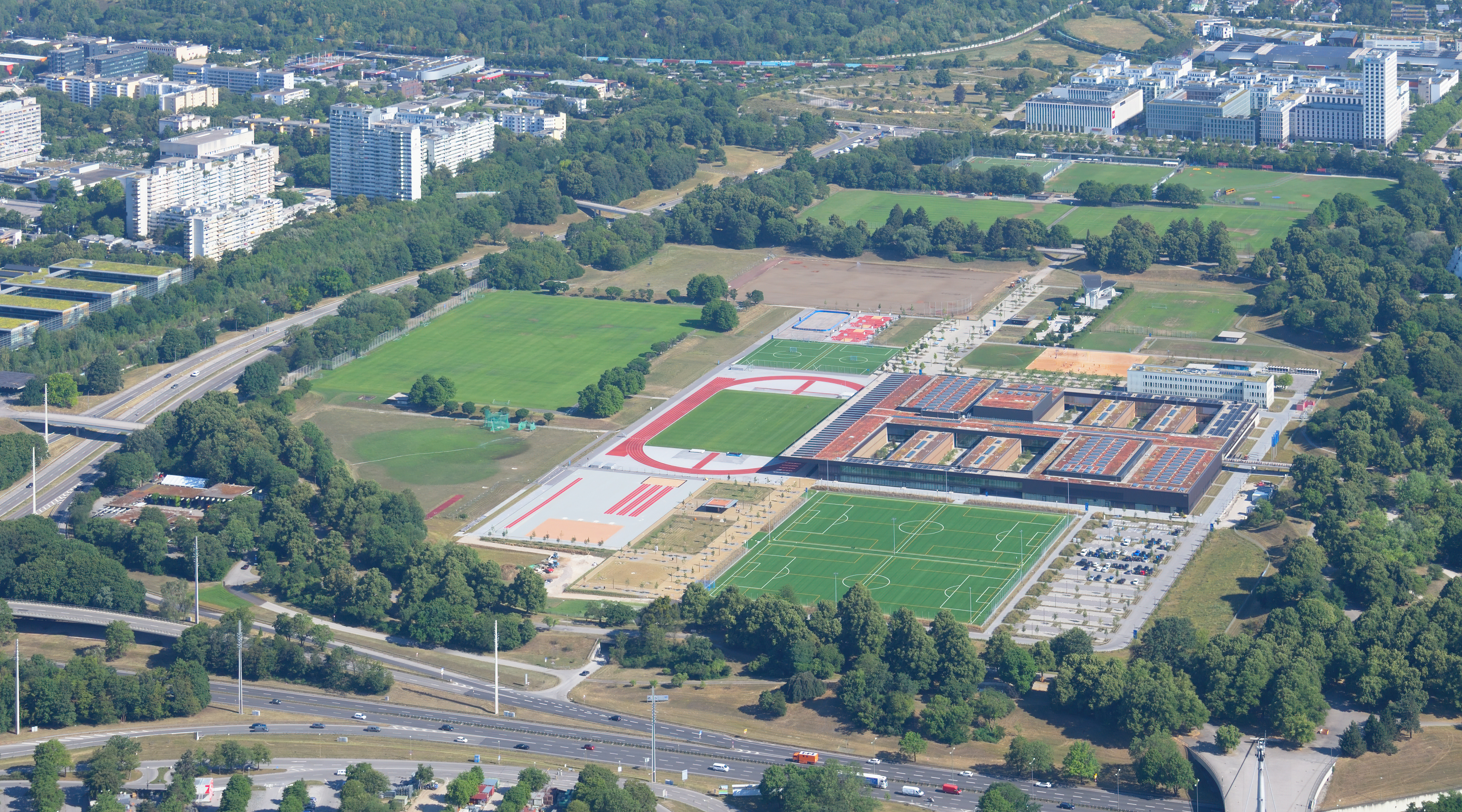
ZHS

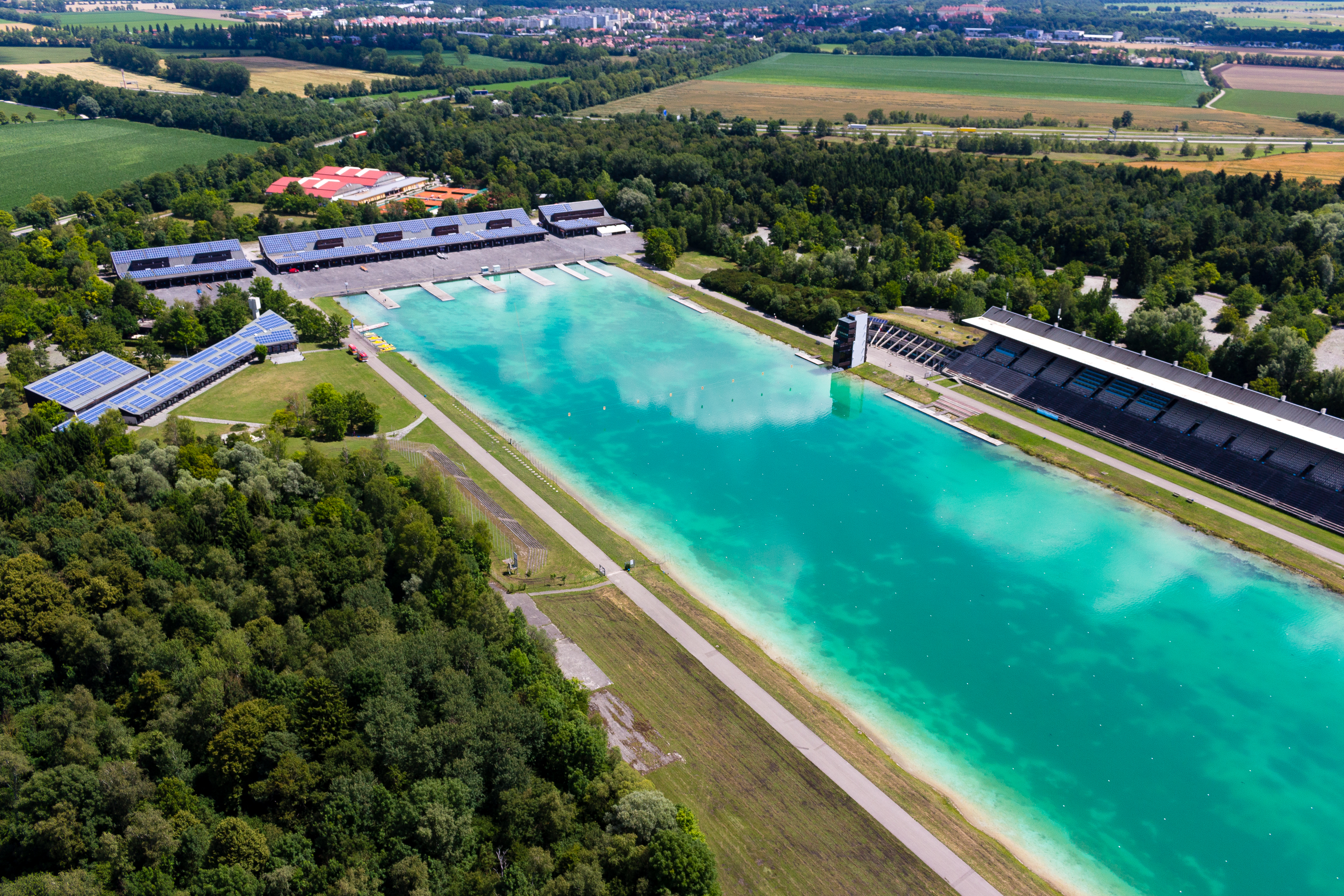
Oberschleißheim Regatta Course

The Zentrale Hochschulsportanlage (ZHS) is with 125.000 Students and over 17.000 active participants each semester the biggest university sports facility in Germany. The 45 ha area lies at the Olympiapark in Milbertshofen-Am Hart in Munich and could be reached by U-Bahnhof Oberwiesenfeld or U-Bahnhof Olympiazentrum. Members can use the Oberschleißheim Regatta Course for rowing.

The TUM Department of Sport and Health Sciences is located here.

== See also ==
- Technical University of Munich
