= TUM School of Medicine and Health =

- Type: Public
- Established: 2023
- Affiliations: TUM
- Location: Munich, Bavaria, Germany
- Website: med.tum.de

The TUM School of Medicine and Health is the medical school of Technical University of Munich, located in Munich. It was formed in 2023 by the merger of the former TUM School of Medicine and Department of Sport and Health Sciences. Its teaching hospital and biomedical research facility is the Rechts der Isar Hospital.

== History ==
In 1967, the TUM School of Medicine was established by the Bavarian government as a Department of the Technical University of Munich. The Rechts der Isar Hospital became the teaching hospital of the newly created school.

The Department of Sport and Health Sciences was established in 2002.

== Departments ==
The TUM School of Medicine and Health consists of the Department Clinical Medicine, the Department Preclinical Medicine and the Department Health and Sport Sciences.

== Rankings ==
University rankings

By subject – Global & National
QS Medicine 2023	73	4
THE Clinical and Health 2024	65	4
ARWU Clinical Medicine 2023	101-150	5-7
ARWU Medical Technology 2023	9	1
QS Pharmacy & Pharmacology 2023	=94	6
ARWU Sport Science 2023	23	1

CHE Ranking 2020 – National
Medicine
Overall study situation	● 1.6
Study organisation	● 1.6
Publications per professor	● 21.8
Sports Sciences
Overall study situation	● 2.3
Support in the study entry phase	● 7/14 pts.
Contact with work environment	● 7/11 pts.
Publications per professor	● 23.6

In clinical medicine, the university has been rated No. 73 in the world (No. 4 in Germany) by QS, No. 65 in the world (No. 4 in Germany) by THE, and No. 101–150 in the world (No. 5–7 in Germany) by ARWU.

In medical technology, ARWU ranks TUM No. 9 in the world and No. 1 nationally.

In the Shanghai Ranking's 2023 Global Ranking of Sport Science Schools and Departments, the university is ranked 23rd in the world and 1st in Germany.

In the national 2020 CHE University Ranking, the department is rated in the top group in 19 out of 24 criteria, including research, study organization, facilities, and overall study situation.

In 2018, TUM was recognized as 10th in the world for expertise in pancreatic cancer by Expertscape.
