= Kövér =

Kövér is a surname. Notable people with the surname include:

- Fanni Kövér (born 2004), Hungarian javelin thrower
- László Kövér (born 1959), Hungarian parliamentarian
- Márton Kövér (born 1987), Hungarian marathon canoeist
