= Technical University of Munich =

Public research university in Munich, Germany

- Technische Universität München
- Motto: The Entrepreneurial University
- Type: Public
- Established: April 12, 1868; 158 years ago
- Founder: Ludwig II of Bavaria
- Academic affiliations: ATHENS; EAIE; EUA; EuroTech; GUEI; TIME; TU9
- Budget: EUR 2,171.0 million (2024): University: EUR 1,250.0 million; Hospital: EUR 921.0 million
- President: Thomas Hofmann (list of presidents)
- Academic staff: 698 professors 8,354 (other academic staff)
- Administrative staff: 4,262 (without university hospital)
- Students: 51,954 (WS 2025–26)
- Location: Arcisstraße 21, Munich, Bavaria, 80333, Germany; 48°08′53″N 11°34′05″E
- Campus: Urban
- Colors: Blue, White
- Website: tum.de

- Location within Germany Location within Bavaria

The Technical University of Munich (TUM or TU Munich; German: Technische Universität München) is a public research university in Munich, Bavaria, Germany. It specializes in engineering, technology, medicine, and applied and natural sciences. It is the only other technical university in Bavaria besides University of Technology Nuremberg (UTN).

Established in 1868 by King Ludwig II of Bavaria, the university now has additional campuses in Garching, Freising, Heilbronn, Straubing, Ottobrunn, and Singapore, with the Garching campus being its largest. The university is organized into seven schools, and is supported by numerous research centers. It is one of the largest universities in Germany, with 51,954 students and an annual budget of €2,171.0 million including the university hospital.

A University of Excellence under the German Universities Excellence Initiative, TUM is among the leading universities in the European Union. Its researchers and alumni include 19 Nobel laureates and 26 Leibniz Prize winners.

== History ==
=== 19th century ===
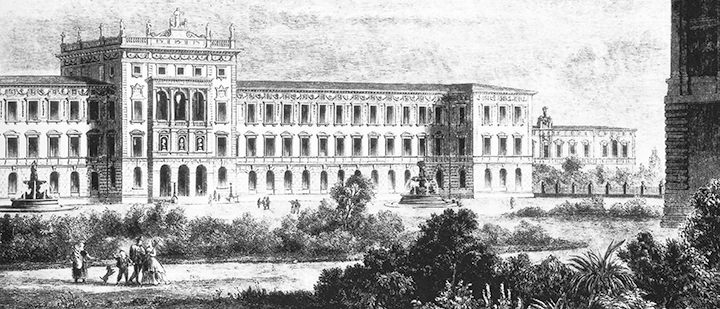
The new building of the Polytechnische Schule München in 1869

In 1868, King Ludwig II of Bavaria founded the Polytechnische Schule München with Karl Maximilian von Bauernfeind as founding director. The new school had its premises at Arcisstraße, where it is still located today. At that time, around 350 students were supervised by 24 professors and 21 lecturers. The institution was divided into six departments: The "General Department" (mathematics, natural sciences, humanities, law and economics), the "Engineering Department" (civil engineering and surveying), the "Building Construction Department" (architecture), the "Mechanical-Technical Department" (mechanical engineering), the "Chemical-Technical Department" (chemistry), and the "Agricultural Department".

In 1877, the Polytechnische Schule München became the Technische Hochschule München (TH München), and in 1901 it was granted the right to award doctorates. With an average of 2,600 to 2,800 students, the TH München was Germany's largest technical university, ahead of the TH Berlin. In 1970 the institution was renamed Technische Universität München.

=== 20th century ===
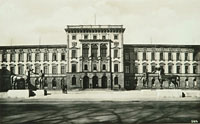
The main building of the Technische Hochschule München in 1909

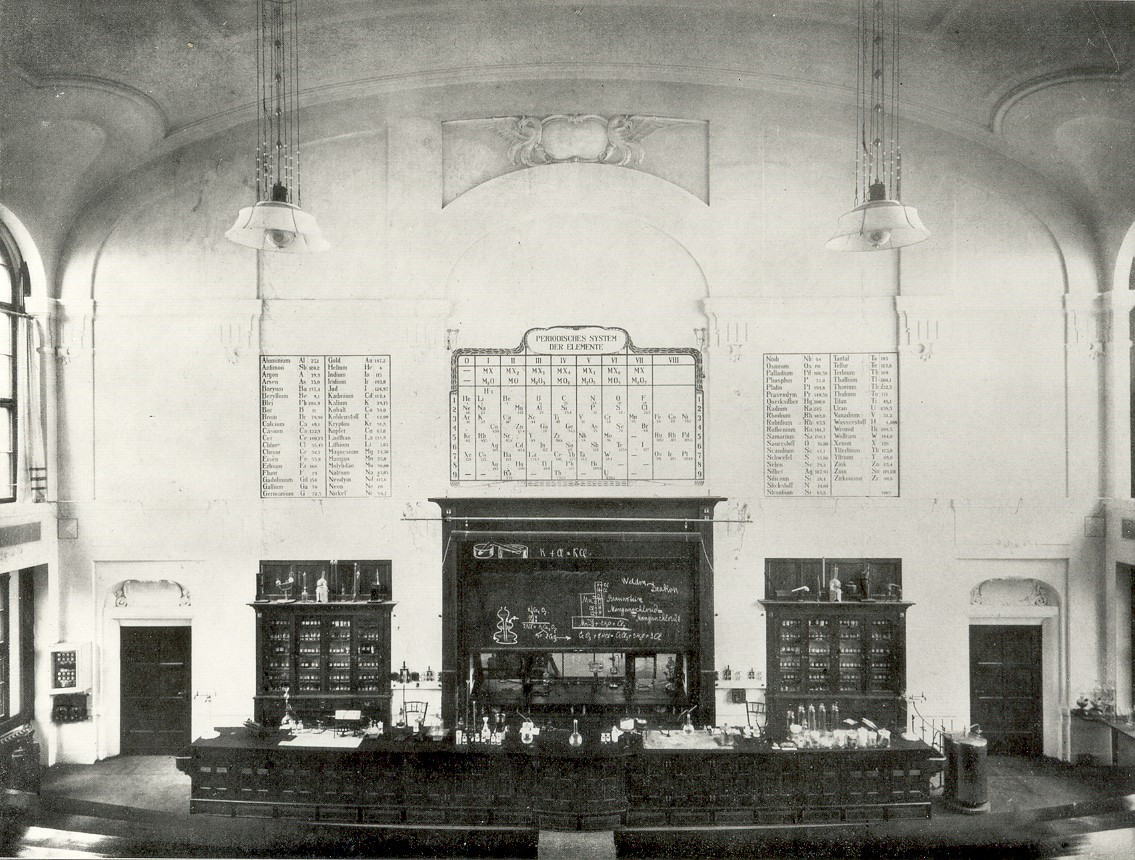
Lecture hall in the former Institute of Chemistry in 1909. An early version of the periodic table can be seen on the wall.

In 1906, Anna Boyksen became the first female student to enroll in electrical engineering, after the Bavarian government had allowed women to study at technical universities in the German Empire. Martha Schneider-Bürger became the first German female civil engineer to graduate from the university in 1927.

In 1913, Jonathan Zenneck became director of the newly created Physics Institute.

During the Weimar Republic, the TH München faced the challenge of limited resources and was drawn into radical political conflicts during the November Revolution, the Great Depression, and the rise of Adolf Hitler. Two of the 16 Nazis killed in Hitler's failed coup attempt in 1923 were students at the university. The National Socialist German Students' League became the strongest faction in the General Students' Committee in 1930, and Jewish and politically unpopular professors were terrorized by the young students.

After Hitler took power, the TH was soon aligned and a "Führer rector" was appointed, with the deans directly responsible to him. The Führerprinzip was also imposed on universities, resulting in a significant restriction of the autonomy of the TH München. In 1933, the newly enacted Law for the Restoration of the Professional Civil Service led to the dismissal of staff deemed "non-Aryan" or married to "non-Aryans," as well as politically "undesirable" professors. Jewish students lost their rights and were banned from enrolling after 1938.

The university was deeply involved in the crimes of the Nazi regime. For instance, Heinz Henseler, a professor in charge of animal breeding at the university, headed a new "Colonial Science Seminar" from 1940. The seminar focused on exploring how to "Germanize" the landscapes of Poland and Russia for future colonization and settlement during the war. The entire Faculty of Agriculture was influenced by the ideology of blood and soil, and agricultural scientists had no qualms about using forced laborers and prisoners of war on university experimental farms. Henseler repeatedly asked his former student and SS chief Heinrich Himmler for additional land and led several excursions to the SS herb garden on the grounds of the Dachau concentration camp with his students.

During World War II, the TH München conducted extensive research in armaments to support the war effort. Notable professors during this time included aircraft designer Willy Messerschmitt and physicist Walther Meissner. Despite the war, high-level basic research continued to be conducted in some institutes, as some professors, staff members, and students dared to disobey and resist. Nobel laureate Hans Fischer protected Jewish students from Nazi persecution. He committed suicide shortly before the end of the war.

=== Post World War II ===
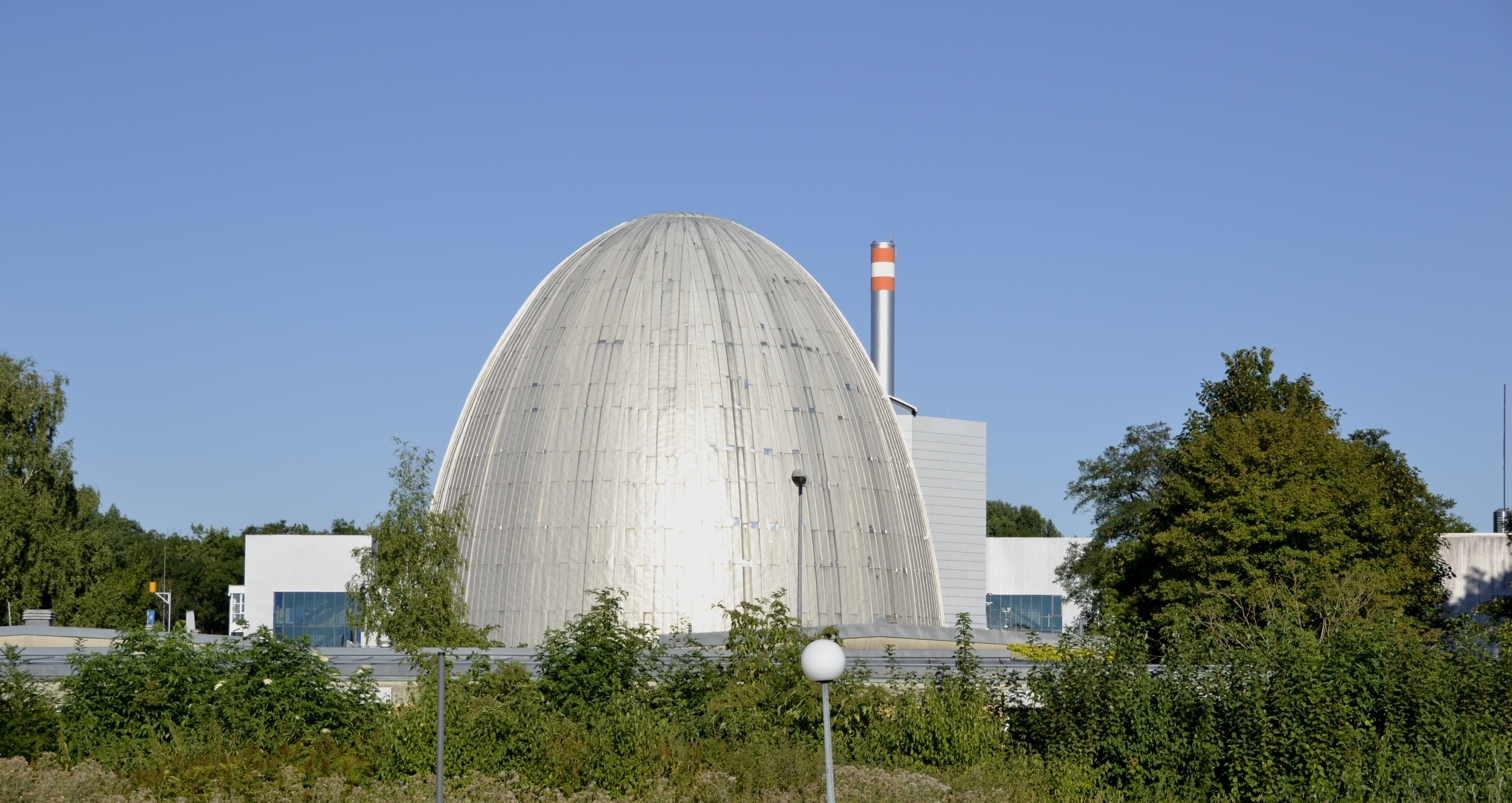
The research reactor FRM I, nicknamed the atomic egg, has become a landmark of the city of Garching, even being featured in its coat of arms.

During the war, 80 percent of the university's facilities in Munich had been destroyed. Under these difficult conditions, teaching resumed in April 1946.

In 1956, the construction of a research reactor in Garching was the beginning of the Garching campus. In 1969, the physics department building was opened there, followed in 1977 by new buildings for the chemistry, biology and geoscience departments.

Between 1868 and 1870 the architect Arnold Zenetti oversaw the construction of several hospital buildings which are today attached to the Munich universities or form part of the TUM campus. In 1967, a TUM School of Medicine was founded with campuses in the buildings of Rechts der Isar Hospital. By 1968, the so-called TH München comprised six faculties, 8,400 students, and 5,700 staff. In 1972, the Zentrale Hochschulsportanlage, a 45-hectare sports center, was built on the grounds of the 1972 Summer Olympics.

In 1970, the TH München was renamed to its present name Technische Universität München. When the Bavarian Higher Education Act came into force in 1974, the six faculties were replaced by eleven departments. In 1992, the field of computer science was established as an independent Department of Informatics, having previously been part of the Department of Mathematics since 1967.

=== 21st century ===
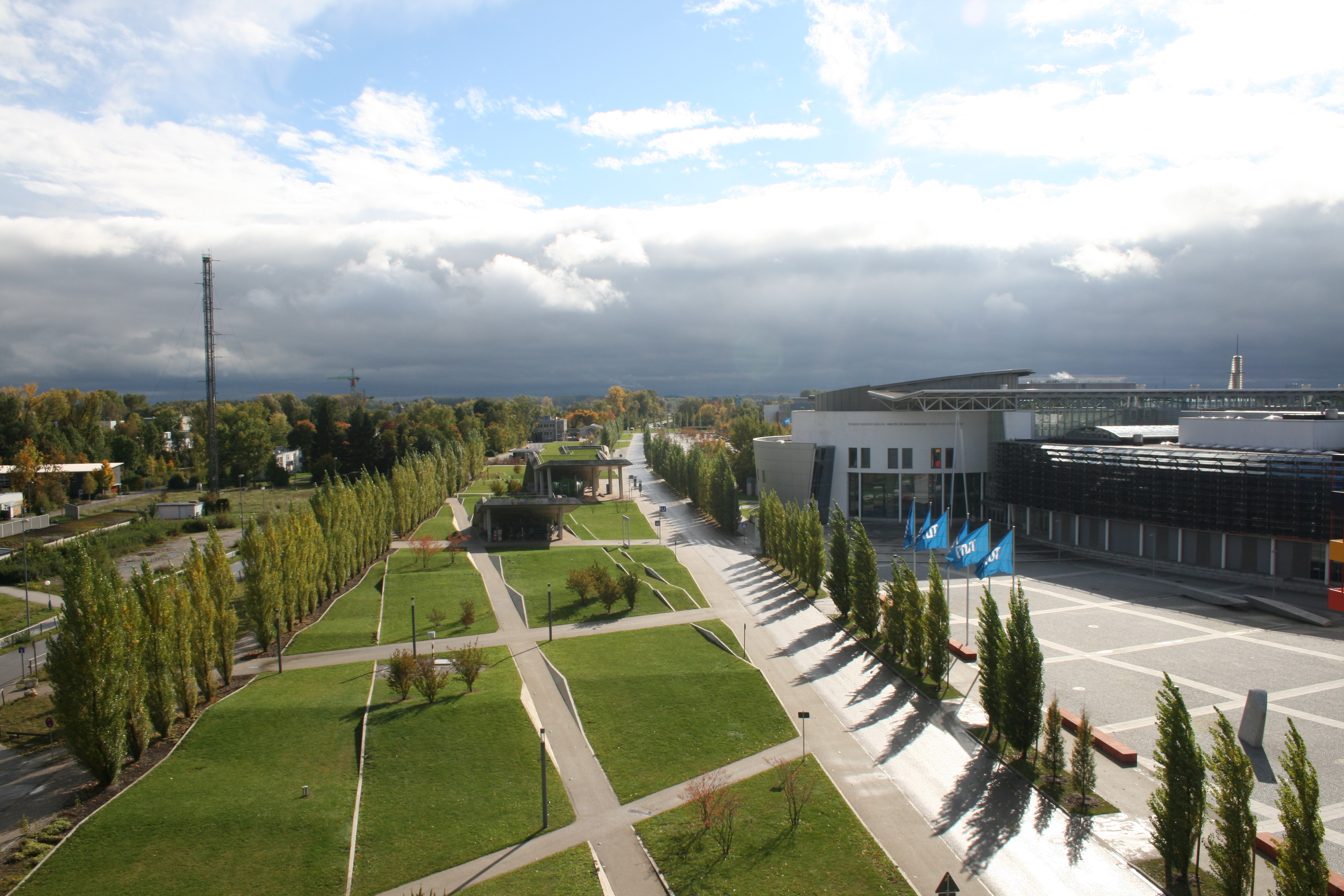
The TUM campus in Garching with the Department of Mechanical Engineering to right

In 2002, TUM Asia was founded in Singapore, in cooperation with the Nanyang Technological University and the National University of Singapore. It was the first time that a German university had established a subsidiary abroad.

The Department of Sport and Health Sciences and the School of Management were established in 2002. The Weihenstephan departments were combined into the "Weihenstephan Centre of Life and Food Sciences" (WZW), which would later become the School of Life Sciences. With the establishment of the School of Education in 2009, the School of Governance in 2016, the Department of Aerospace and Geodesy in 2018, the School of Natural Sciences in 2023, the university comprises 7 schools and 29 research departments.

Since the inception of the German Universities Excellence Initiative in 2006, TUM has won every round of evaluation and the title University of Excellence.

As part of its Agenda 2030, the 15 schools and departments were consolidated into seven schools by 2023.

In 2024 and 2025, TUM won A2RL, an autonomous racing league held in Abu Dhabi, in the car racing format.

== Campuses ==
TUM's academic faculties are divided amongst numerous campuses.

=== Munich ===
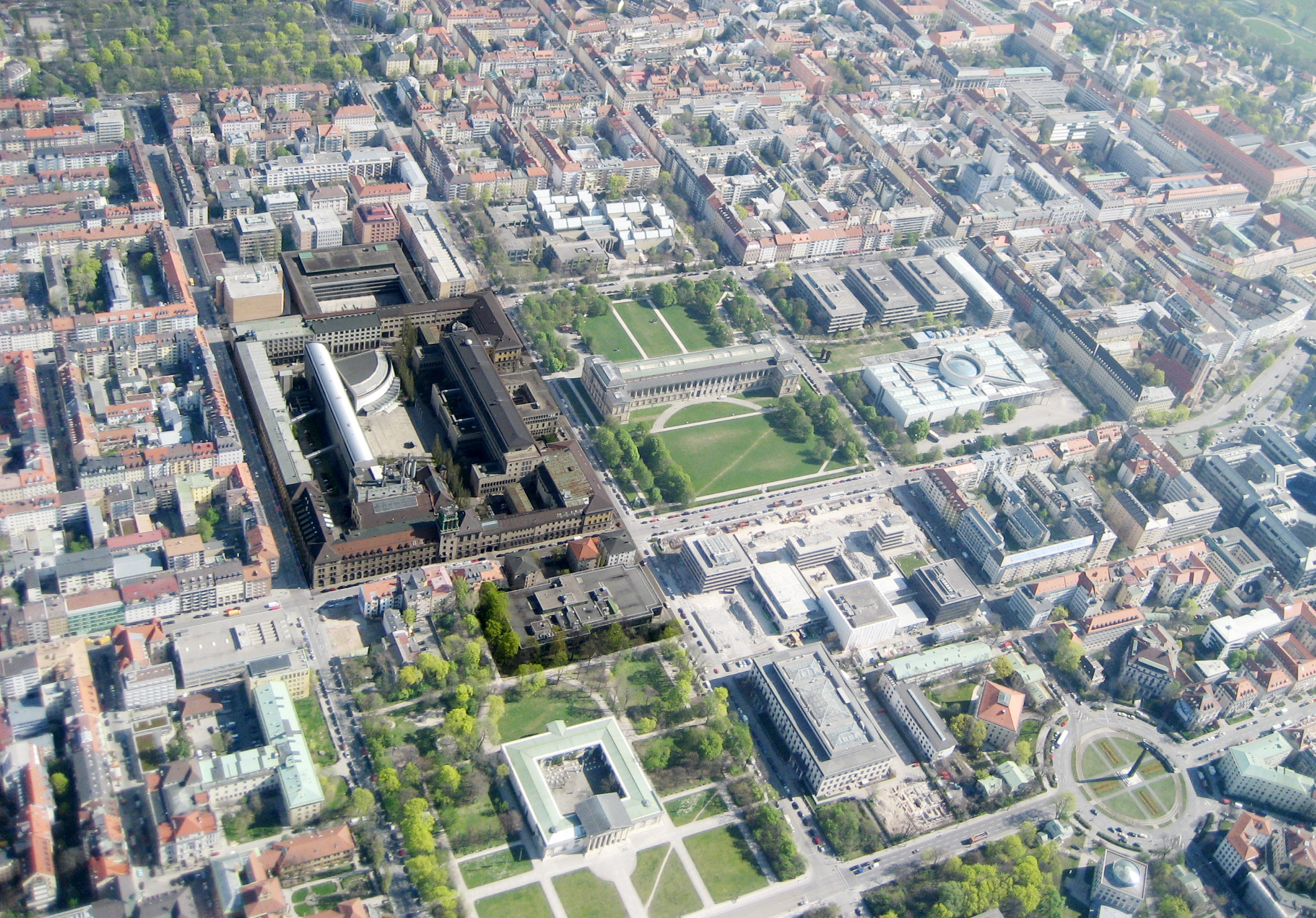
Aerial view of the main building (dark brown) in downtown Munich (2007)

The historic Main Campus (Stammgelände) is located in Maxvorstadt, the central borough of Munich. Today, the departments of Architecture, Civil, Geo and Environmental Engineering, Electrical and Computer Engineering and the Schools of Management, Governance, Education are located here.

The TUM School of Medicine is located at the site of its university hospital, the Rechts der Isar Hospital, in the district of Haidhausen.

The TUM Department of Sport and Health Sciences is located in the Olympiapark, the former site of the 1972 Summer Olympics.

=== Garching ===
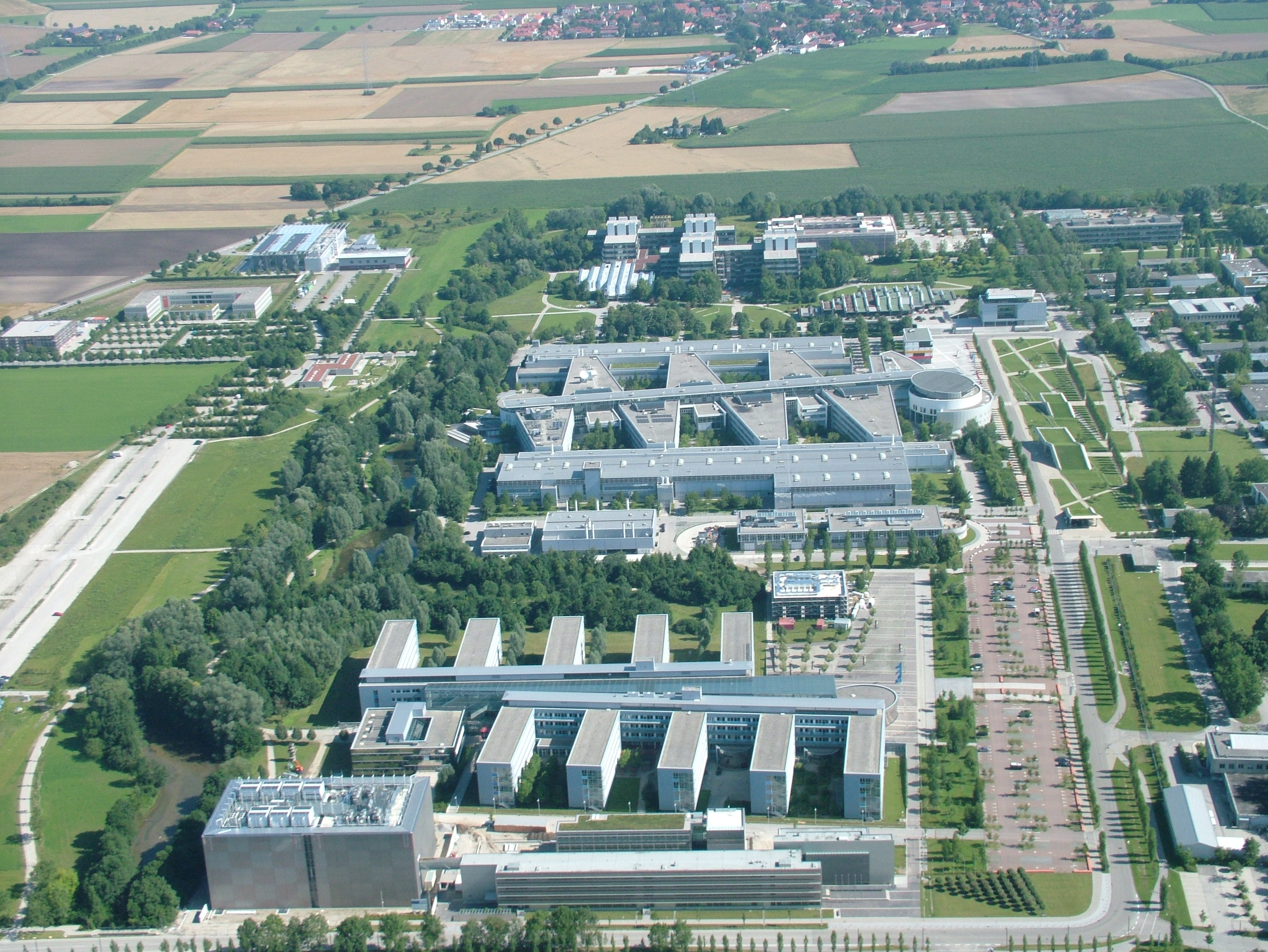
Aerial view of the TUM campus in Garching (2011)

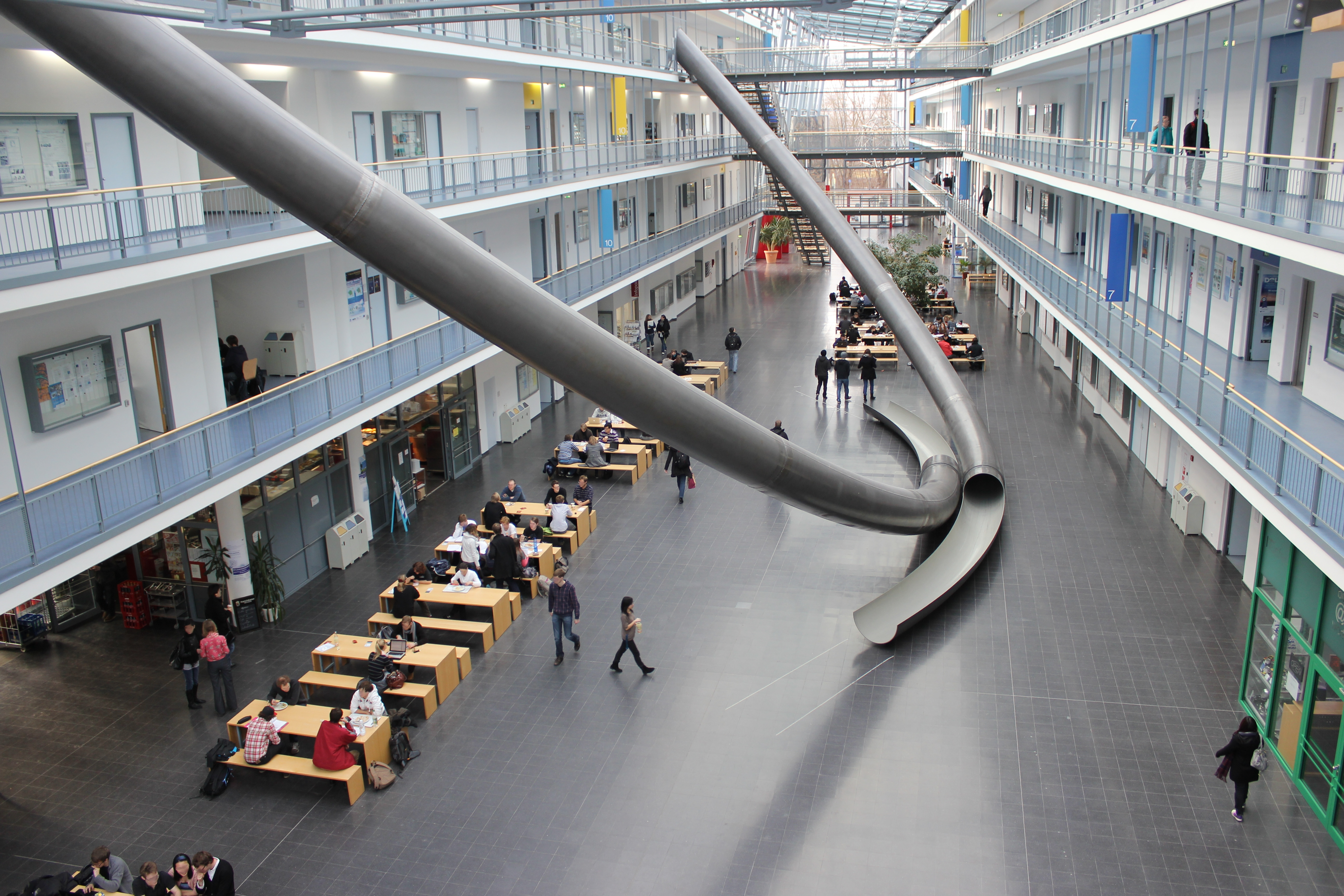
Interior of the faculty building for the Departments of Mathematics and Informatics

The campus in Garching, located around 10 km north of Munich, has grown to become the largest TUM campus. In the last decades, the departments of Physics, Chemistry, Mechanical Engineering, Informatics and Mathematics have all relocated from their former buildings in the Main Campus. They have since been joined by numerous research institutes, including the Max Planck Institutes for Plasma Physics, Astrophysics, Extraterrestrial Physics and Quantum Optics, the Forschungsreaktor München II (FRM II), the headquarters of the European Southern Observatory (ESO), and the Leibniz Supercomputing Centre, one of the fastest supercomputers in Europe.

A landmark of the Garching campus is the Oskar von Miller Tower, a meteorological measurement tower with a height of 62 m. The Garching campus is connected to Munich by the Autobahn and the Munich U-Bahn. It has its own fire department.

=== Weihenstephan ===
The third TUM campus is located 35 km north of Munich in Weihenstephan, Freising. It hosts the School of Life Sciences.

=== Other locations ===
Additional TUM facilities are located in Ottobrunn (Department of Aerospace and Geodesy), Straubing, Heilbronn, and Singapore.

=== TUM Asia ===
TUM operates a subsidiary in Singapore. In 2001, the German Institute of Science and Technology (GIST) – TUM Asia was founded in partnership with the National University of Singapore and the Nanyang Technological University, offering a range of Master's programs. In 2010, TUM Asia started offering bachelor's degrees in collaboration with the Singapore Institute of Technology.

In 2010, TUM and the Nanyang Technological University founded TUMCREATE, a research platform for the improvement of Singapore's public transportation.

== Academics ==
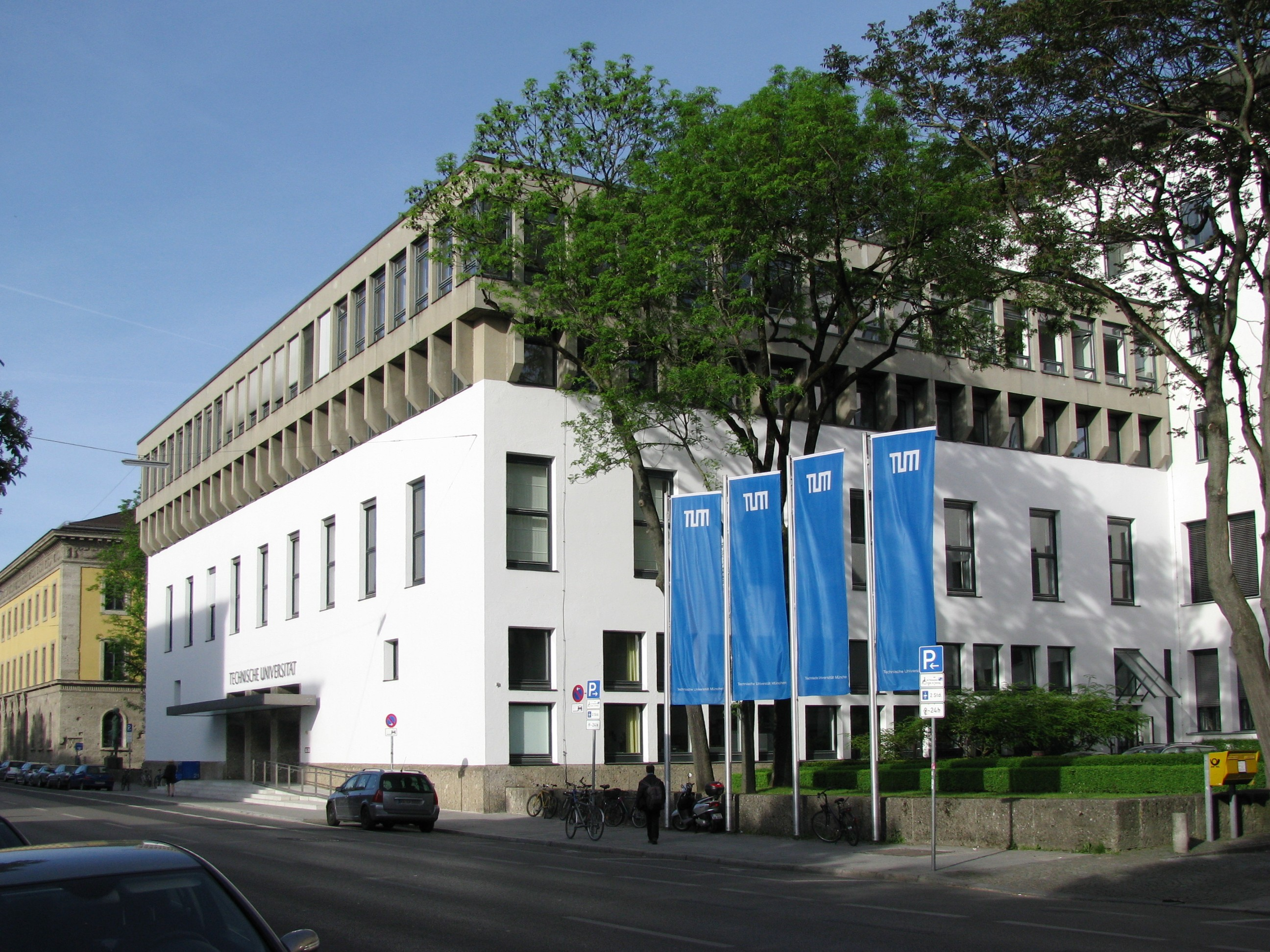
Entrance to the Main Campus in Munich

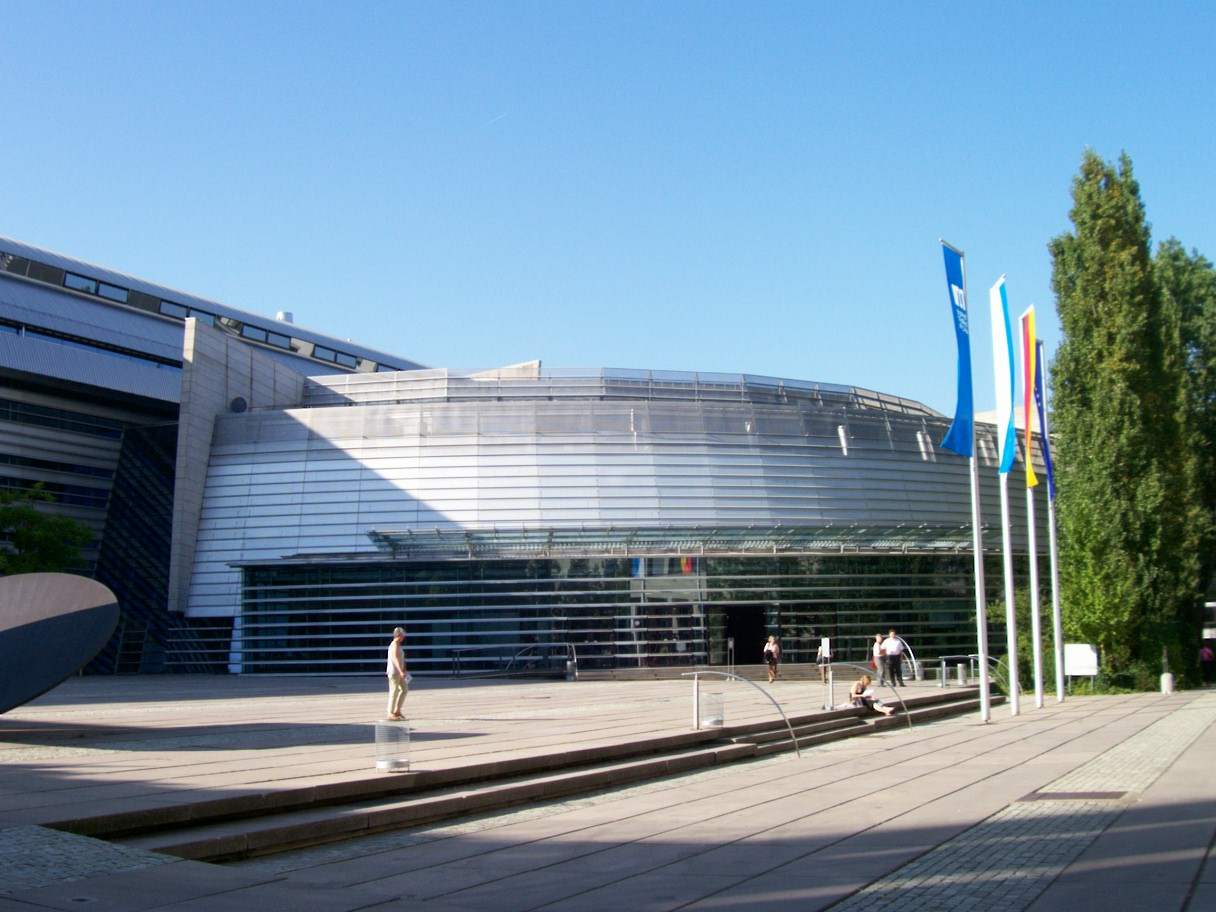
The Werner von Siemens Auditorium Maximum on the Main Campus

=== Schools and departments ===
As a technical university, the university specializes in engineering, technology, medicine, and the applied and natural sciences. Compared to a Volluniversität (a universal university), it lacks the Geisteswissenschaften, including law and many branches of the social sciences.

As of 2025, the Technical University of Munich is organized into seven schools:

Schools	Students	Female	International
TUM School of Computation, Information and Technology (CIT); Department of Mathematics; Department of Computer Engineering; Department of Computer Science; Department of Electrical Engineering	14,866	3,395 (22.9%)	8,291 (55.8%)
TUM School of Engineering and Design (ED); Department of Aerospace & Geodesy; Department of Architecture; Department of Civil & Environmental Engineering; Department of Energy & Process Engineering; Department of Engineering Physics & Computation; Department of Materials Engineering; Department of Mechanical Engineering; Department of Mobility Systems Engineering	13,884	4,178 (30.1%)	6,366 (45.8%)
TUM School of Natural Sciences (NAT); Department of Biosciences; Department of Chemistry; Department of Physics	5,173	1,850 (35.8%)	2,060 (39.8%)
TUM School of Life Sciences (LS); Department of Molecular Life Sciences; Department of Life Science Systems; Department of Life Science Engineering	4,761	2,736 (57.5%)	1,508 (31.7%)
TUM School of Medicine and Health (MED); Department Clinical Medicine; Department Preclinical Medicine; Department Health and Sport Sciences	4,335	2,735 (63.1%)	753 (17.4%)
TUM School of Management (MGT); Department of Economics & Policy; Department of Finance & Accounting; Department of Innovation and Entrepreneurship; Department of Marketing, Strategy & Leadership; Department of Operations & Technology	7,005	2,791 (39.8%)	3,739 (53.4%)
TUM School of Social Sciences and Technology (SOT); Department of Educational Sciences; Department of Science, Technology and Society; Department of Governance	2,079	1,181 (56.8%)	500 (24.1%)
TUM Campus Straubing	828	359 (43.4%)	590 (71.3%)
Total	52,931	19,225 (36.3%)	23,807 (45.0%)

Other institutions include the Rechts der Isar Hospital, the TUM Graduate School and the Munich School of Politics and Public Policy.

The TUM School of Management is triple accredited by the European Quality Improvement System (EQUIS), the Association to Advance Collegiate Schools of Business (AACSB) and the Association of MBAs (AMBA).

=== Research ===
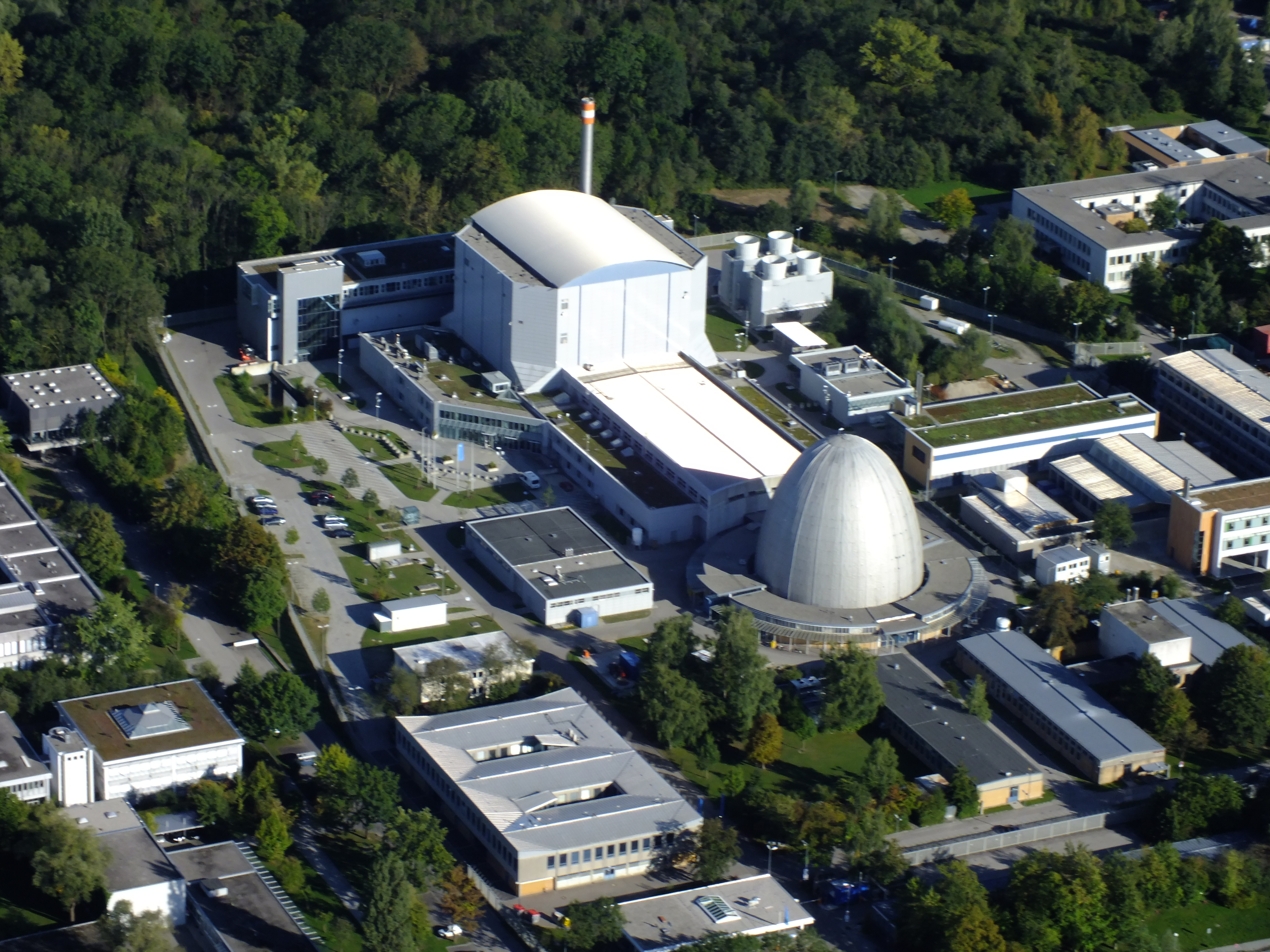
TUM has operated two research reactors on its Garching campus, the egg-shaped FRM I from 1957 to 2000 and the FRM II (with the curved roof) since 2004.

The Technical University of Munich is one of the most research-focused universities in Europe. This claim is supported by relevant rankings, such as the funding ranking of the German Research Foundation and the research ranking of the Centre for Higher Education.

Under the German Universities Excellence Initiative, TUM has obtained funding for multiple research clusters, including e-conversion (energy technology), MCQST (quantum mechanics), ORIGINS (astrophysics, biophysics and particle physics), and SYNERGY (neurology).

In addition to the schools and departments, TUM has set up numerous research centers with external cooperation partners.

Integrative research centers (IRCs) combine research with teaching. They include the TUM Institute for Advanced Study (TUM-IAS), the Munich Center for Technology in Society (MCTS), the Munich Data Science Institute (MDSI), the Munich School of Engineering (MSE), the Munich School of BioEngineering (MSB), and the Munich School of Robotics and Machine Intelligence (MSRM).

Corporate research centers (CRCs) carry out research independently of the schools and departments, cooperating with industry partners for application-driven research. They include the research reactor FRM II, the Center for Functional Protein Assemblies (CPA), the Catalysis Research Center (CRC), the center for translational Cancer Research (TranslaTUM), the Walter Schottky Institute (WSI), the Hans Eisenmann-Zentrum for Agricultural Science, and the Institute for Food & Health (ZIEL).

=== Partnerships ===
TUM has over 160 international partnerships, ranging from joint research activities to international study programs. Partners include:

- Europe: ETH Zurich, EPFL, ENSEA, École Centrale Paris, TU Eindhoven, Technical University of Denmark, Technical University of Vienna, NMBU
- United States: MIT, Stanford University, Northwestern University, University of Illinois, Cornell University, University of Texas at Austin, Georgia Tech
- Asia: National University of Singapore, Multimedia University, Hong Kong University of Science and Technology, Huazhong University of Science and Technology, Tsinghua University, University of Tokyo, Indian Institute of Technology Delhi, Amrita University, Sirindhorn International Institute of Technology,
- Australia: Australian National University, University of Melbourne, RMIT University.

Through the Erasmus+ program and its international student exchange program TUMexchange, students can complete exchange semesters at partner universities.

Kutaisi International University (KIU) in Georgia is developed through strategic partnership with TUM, however by 2024–2026, questions arose about the TUM's continued engagement. The uncertainty coincided with governance problems, high staff turnover, and criticism of KIU's planned gematric "Astrolinguistics–Astroarchaeology" programmes as pseudoscientific, amid broader higher-education reforms in Georgia that critics said undermined university autonomy while shielding Bidzina Ivanishvili's personal project.

=== Rankings and reputation ===
University rankings

Overall – Global & National
QS World 2027	▼25	1
THE World 2027	▼25	1
ARWU World 2026	45	▲1
QS Europe 2026	▼ =12	1
THE Employability 2025	13	1

By subject – Global & National
QS Engineering and Technology 2024	19	1
THE Engineering 2024	22	1
QS Natural Science 2024	23	1
THE Physical Sciences 2024	22	1
QS Life Sciences and Medicine 2024	77	3
THE Life Sciences 2024	33	2
QS Computer Science and Information Systems 2024	31	1
THE Computer Science 2024	15	1

==== Overall rankings ====
TUM is ranked 25th worldwide (first in Germany) in both the QS World University Rankings 2027, and the Times Higher Education World University Rankings 2027. TUM ranks 45th worldwide (first in Germany) in the Academic Ranking of World Universities 2026. TUM ranked 12th in Europe in the 2026 QS Europe rankings. In the 2026 Nature Index of academic institutions, TUM ranked 84th worldwide and first in Germany.

In the 2025 edition of the Times Higher Education's Global University Employability Ranking, graduates from TUM were ranked 13th globally and first in Germany. The same year, TUM held the 27th position globally (also first in Germany) in the Times Higher Education World Reputation Rankings. In the QS World University Sustainability Ranking 2025, TUM was ranked 83rd overall and first in Germany. In the Times Higher Education's Impact Rankings 2024 (industry, innovation, and infrastructure), TUM tied for first place worldwide. In Reuters' 2019 European Most Innovative University ranking, TUM ranked 7th.

==== Subject rankings ====
In the QS World Rankings, TUM is placed 22nd overall and is the highest ranked German university in engineering and technology (19th), natural sciences (23rd), and computer science (31st). In the Times Higher Education World University Rankings, TUM ranks 27th in business and economics, 22nd in the physical sciences, 22nd in engineering and technology, and 15th in computer science, and is the highest ranked German university in these areas. TUM is also ranked first in Germany in several subject areas by ARWU, including computer science and engineering, electrical engineering, aerospace engineering, food science, biotechnology, environmental engineering, medical technology, management, and transportation science.

QS World University Rankings by Subject 2024
Subject	Global	National
Arts & Humanities	N/A	N/A
Architecture and Built Environment	=24	2
Art History	21–40	1–2
Engineering and Technology	▲19	1
Engineering – Chemical	▲ =38	▲2
Engineering – Civil and Structural	=40	1
Computer Science and Information Systems	▼31	1
Data Science and Artificial Intelligence	=35	1
Engineering – Electrical and Electronic	▼19	1
Engineering – Mechanical	▼ =21	2
Life Sciences & Medicine	▲77	3
Agriculture and Forestry	▼44	3
Anatomy and Physiology	▲51–100	▲2–4
Biological Sciences	▲ =46	3
Medicine	▲ =72	▲3
Pharmacy and Pharmacology	▲ =88	▲4
Natural Sciences	▲23	1
Chemistry	▲20	1
Earth and Marine Sciences	▲51–100	▲1–7
Environmental Sciences	▲ =66	2
Geology	101–150	7–13
Geophysics	▲51–100	▲1–7
Materials Sciences	▲ =23	▲1
Mathematics	▼ =47	2
Physics and Astronomy	▼ =18	1
Social Sciences & Management	▲ =149	▲5
Accounting and Finance	▲101–150	▲3–6
Business and Management Studies	▼ =80	▲1
Economics and Econometrics	111	5
Education and Training	▲ =83	▲1
Politics	201–250	9–11
Sociology	301–350	16–19
Statistics and Operational Research	▲23	1

THE World University Rankings by Subject 2024
Subject	Global	National
Arts & humanities	126–150	12–14
Business & economics	▲27	1
Clinical & health	▼65	4
Computer science	▼15	1
Education	50	2
Engineering	▼22	1
Life sciences	▲ =33	▲2
Physical sciences	▲22	1

ARWU Global Ranking of Academic Subjects 2023
Subject	Global	National
Natural Sciences
Mathematics	▼76–100	▼4–5
Physics	76–100	▲5–7
Chemistry	▼76–100	1–4
Earth Sciences	101–150	5–10
Geography	101–150	▲2–4
Ecology	▲47	4
Atmospheric Science	▲201–300	▲13–22
Engineering
Mechanical Engineering	▼151–200	▲2–4
Electrical & Electronic Engineering	22	1
Automation & Control	▲51–75	1
Telecommunication Engineering	▼201–300	▼4–5
Instruments Science & Technology	▼151–200	1
Biomedical Engineering	▲76–100	▲1
Computer Science & Engineering	51–75	1
Civil Engineering	▲151–200	2–3
Chemical Engineering	201–300	▲3–4
Materials Science & Engineering	101–150	3–5
Nanoscience & Nanotechnology	101–150	3–5
Energy Science & Engineering	101–150	▲3–6
Environmental Science & Engineering	▼18	1
Water Resources	▲76–100	▲1–3
Food Science & Technology	51–75	1
Biotechnology	40	1
Aerospace Engineering	▼36	1
Transportation Science & Technology	▲51–75	1
Remote Sensing	▼6	1
Life Sciences
Biological Sciences	76–100	▲5–7
Human Biological Sciences	51–75	▲5–7
Agricultural Sciences	▼51–75	2–4
Medical Sciences
Clinical Medicine	101–150	▲5–7
Public Health	▲151–200	▲5–6
Medical Technology	▲9	1
Pharmacy & Pharmaceutical Sciences	▲51–75	▲5–8
Social Sciences
Economics	151–200	▲5–8
Statistics	▲51–75	1
Political Sciences	▲101–150	▲5–8
Education	▲101–150	▲2–4
Psychology	▲201–300	▲20–25
Business Administration	▲151–200	▲2–3
Management	▲76–100	1
Public Administration	101–150	4–6

== Student life ==
As of winter semester 2024/25, 52,931 students are enrolled at TUM, of whom 36% are female and 45% are international students.

=== Student initiatives ===
Various initiatives are run by students, including TEDxTUM, the TUM Speaker Series (past speakers having included Ban Ki-moon, Tony Blair, Bill Gates, Sam Altman and Eric Schmidt), and IKOM, a career fair.

A notable student group is the Workgroup for Rocketry and Space Flight (WARR), which won all SpaceX Hyperloop pod competitions in 2017 through 2019. In 2021, TUM Boring, won the tunnel-boring competition sponsored by The Boring Company in Las Vegas, Nevada. In 2023, a team from the university won second place at the Indy Autonomous Challenge, an autonomous racecar competition in Las Vegas.

=== Student government ===
The Student Council is the main body for university-wide student representation. It elects the General Student Committee (AStA), which represents the professional, economic and social interests of the students, by the Bavarian Higher Education Act. Each school or department will also have a separate Departmental Student Council.

Every year, university elections are held to elect student representatives in the Senate, the university's highest academic authority, and in the faculty councils.

=== Events ===
The Student Council organizes a number of annual festivals and events. TUNIX and GARNIX are week-long open air festivals held every summer. TUNIX is held at the Königsplatz near the Munich campus, while GARNIX is held at the Garching campus. GLÜHNIX is a christmas market held in front of the Department of Mechanical Engineering every December. MaiTUM is a Bavarian Maifest, held at the Main Campus in May each year.

=== Campus life ===
The Zentrale Hochschulsportanlage (ZHS) is the largest university sports facility in Germany, offering hundreds of different sports programs.

Music ensembles at TUM include the TUM Chamber Orchestra, the TUM Jazz Band, the TUM Choir, and the Symphonisches Ensemble München, a full-size symphony orchestra.

== Notable people ==
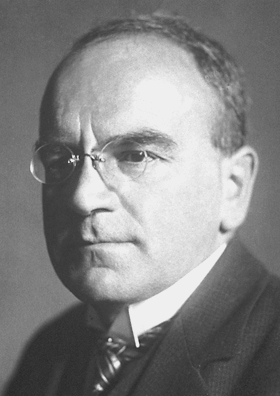
Heinrich Otto Wieland, professor at TUM from 1913 to 1921, won the 1927 Nobel Prize in Chemistry.

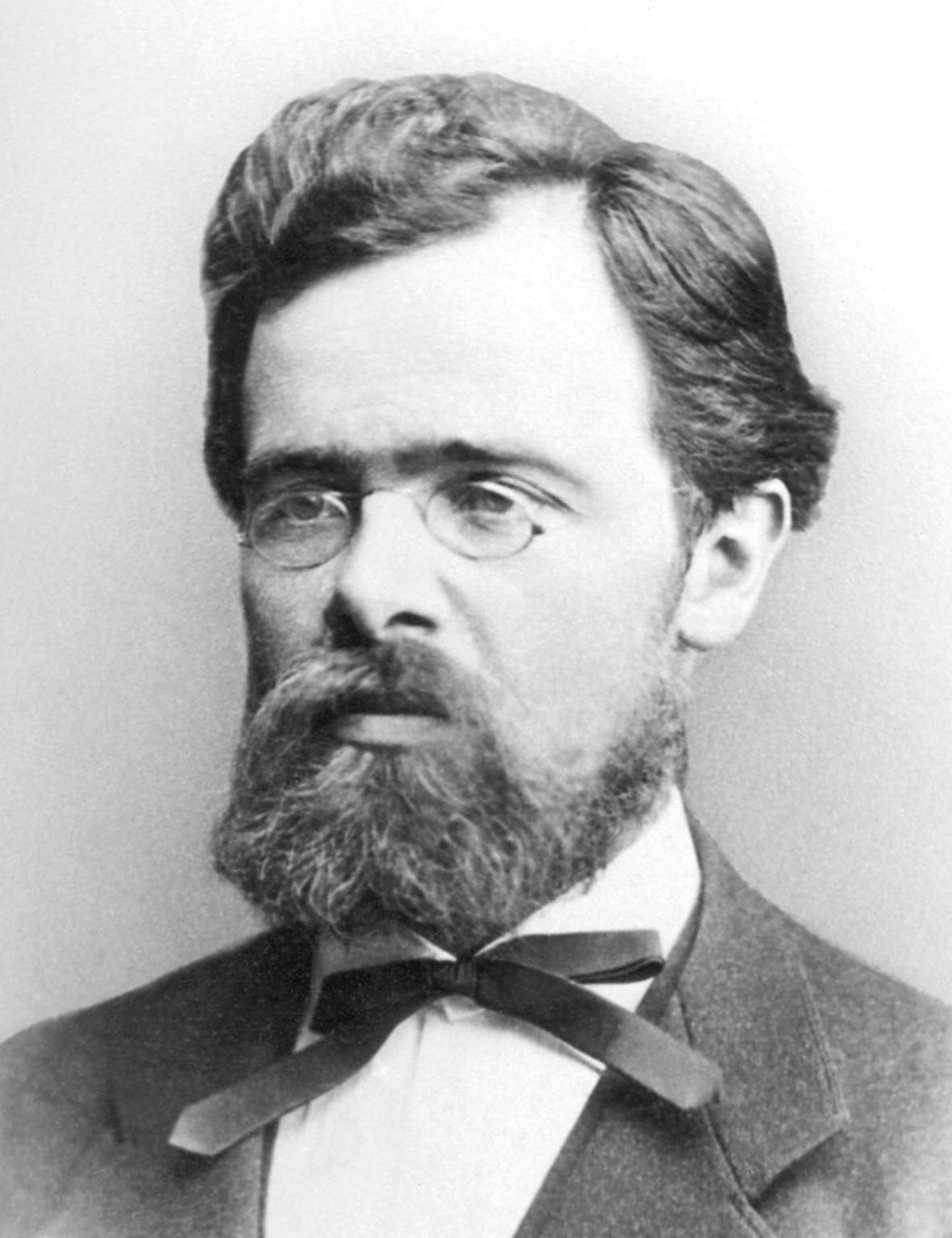
Carl von Linde, lecturer at the TH Munich, discovered the refrigeration cycle that led to the development of the modern refrigerator.

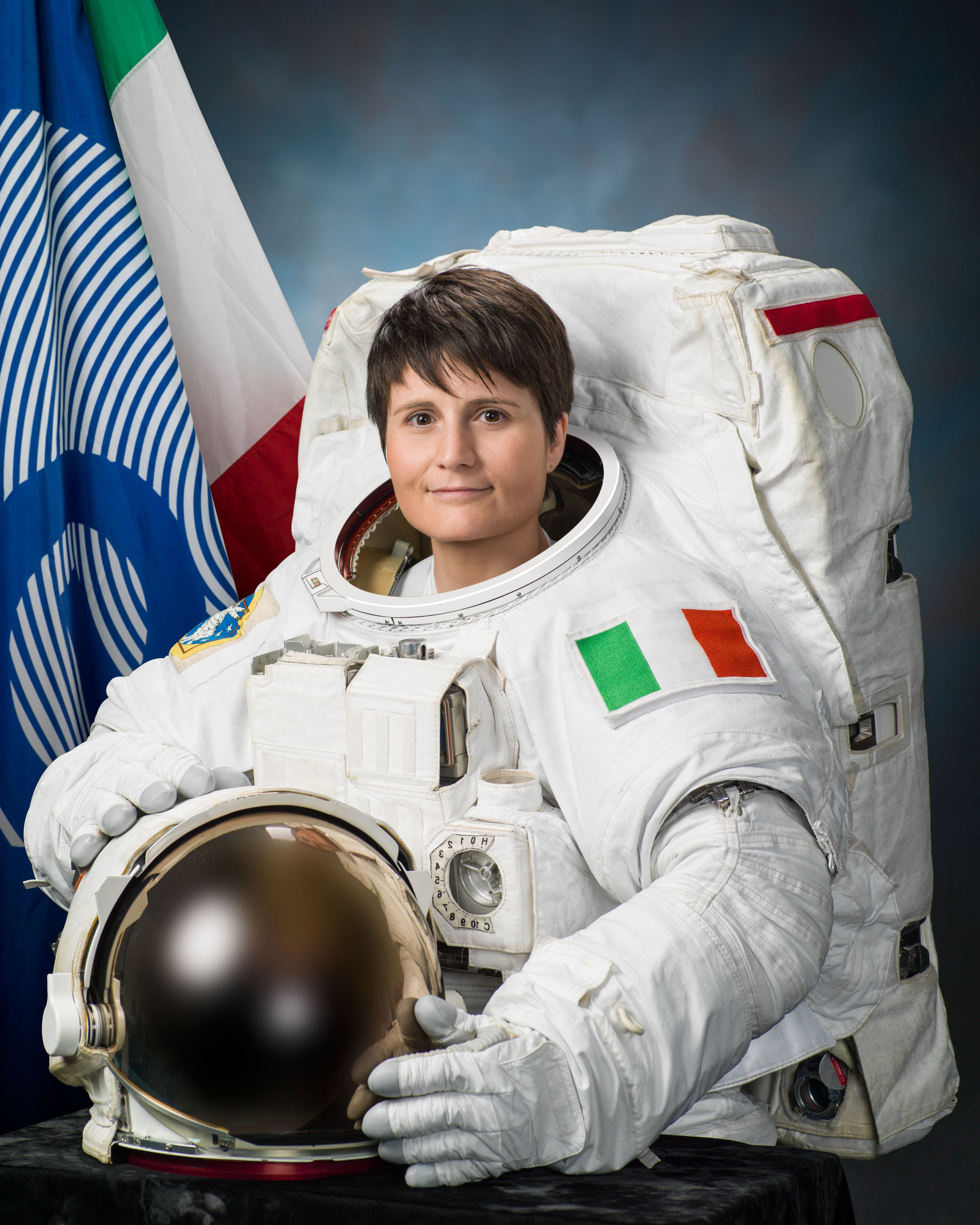
Samantha Cristoforetti, an ESA Astronaut and one of the commanders of the ISS

=== Nobel Prize laureates ===
17 Nobel Prize winners have studied, taught or researched at the TUM:

- 1927 – Heinrich Otto Wieland, Chemistry (bile acids)
- 1929 – Thomas Mann, Literature (Buddenbrooks)
- 1930 – Hans Fischer, Chemistry (constitution and synthesis of haemin and chlorophyll)
- 1961 – Rudolf L. Mößbauer, Physics (Mößbauer effect)
- 1964 – Konrad Emil Bloch, Physiology or Medicine (mechanism and regulation of the cholesterol and fatty acid metabolism)
- 1973 – Ernst Otto Fischer, Chemistry (sandwich complexes)
- 1985 – Klaus von Klitzing, Physics (quantum Hall effect)
- 1986 – Ernst Ruska, Physics (electron microscope)
- 1988 – Johann Deisenhofer and Robert Huber, Chemistry (crystal structure of an integral membrane protein)
- 1989 – Wolfgang Paul, Physics (ion trap)
- 1991 – Erwin Neher, Physiology or Medicine (function of single ion channels in cells)
- 2001 – Wolfgang Ketterle, Physics (Bose-Einstein condensation in dilute gases of alkali atoms)
- 2007 – Gerhard Ertl, Chemistry (chemical processes on solid surfaces)
- 2016 – Bernard L. Feringa (TUM-IAS fellow), Chemistry (molecular machine)
- 2017 – Joachim Frank, Chemistry (cryo-electron microscopy)
- 2022 – Anton Zeilinger, Physics (Quantum information science)

=== Scientists ===
- Friedrich L. Bauer, computer scientist, known for the stack data structure
- Rudolf Bayer, computer scientist, known for the B-tree and Red–black tree
- Rudolf Diesel, engineer, inventor of the diesel engine
- Claude Dornier, airplane designer
- Barbara Drossel, German physicist studying complex systems
- Emil Erlenmeyer, chemist, known for the Erlenmeyer flask
- Asta Hampe, engineer, statistician and economist
- Carl von Linde, engineer, discoverer of the refrigeration cycle
- Heinz Maier-Leibnitz, physicist
- Walther Meissner, physicist, known for the Meissner effect
- Willy Messerschmitt, aircraft designer, known for the Messerschmitt fighters
- Oskar von Miller, engineer, founder of the Deutsches Museum
- Erich Rieger, astrophysicist, discoverer of the Rieger periodicities that permeate the Solar System

=== Astronauts ===
- Michaela Benthaus, first wheelchair user to travel to space and aerospace engineer
- Samantha Cristoforetti, ESA Astronaut

== See also ==
- Education in Germany
- List of universities in Germany
- List of forestry universities and colleges

== Bibliography ==
- Pabst, Martin (2006). Technische Universität München: die Geschichte eines Wissenschaftsunternehmens (in German). Berlin: Metropol. ISBN 978-3-938690-34-5. OCLC 645055557.
- Wengenroth, Ulrich (1993). Technische Universität München - Annäherungen an ihre Geschichte (in German). Technische Universität München. ISBN 978-3-929391-03-9. OCLC 243765003.
