= Rechts der Isar Hospital =

Coordinates: 48.136°N 11.599°E

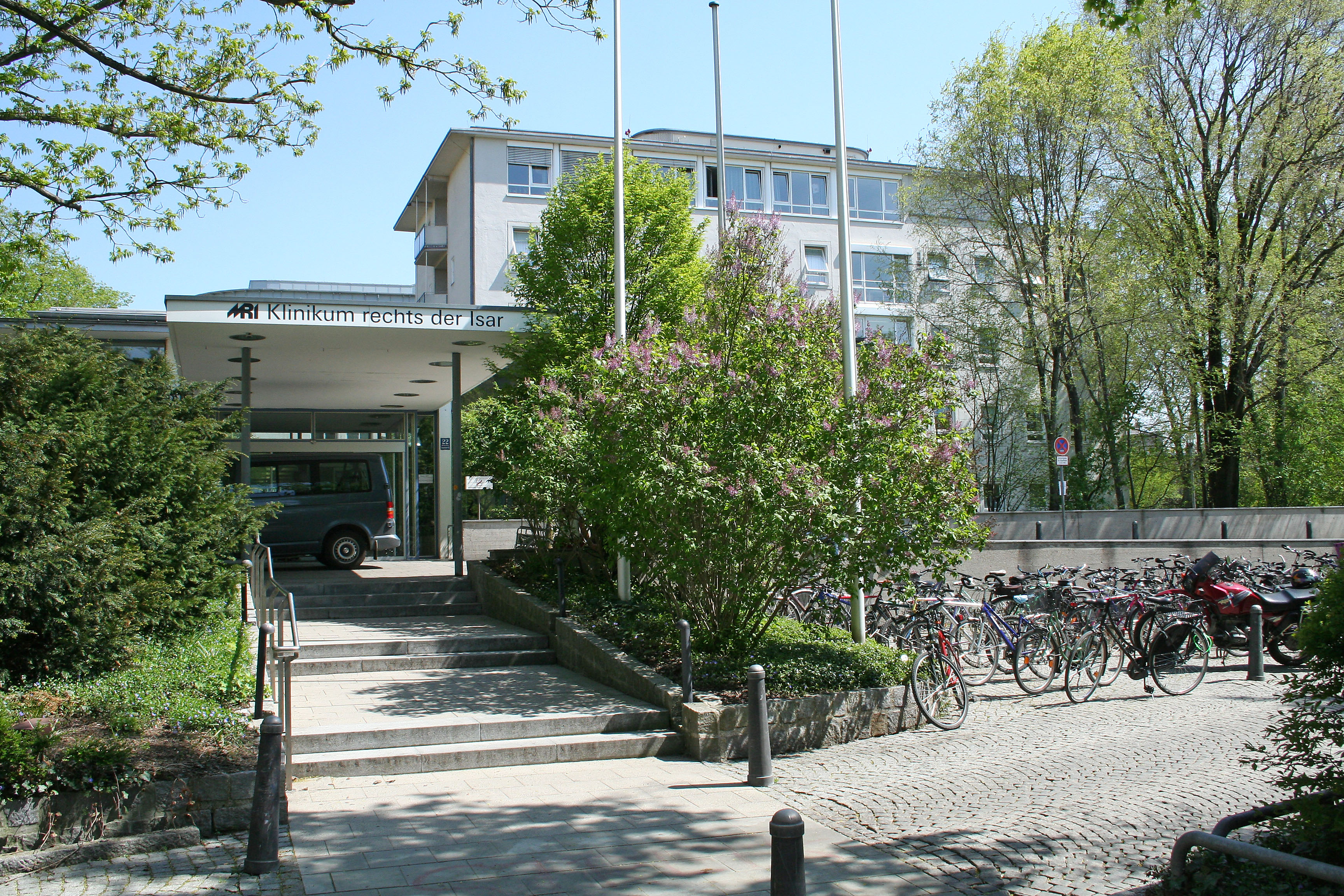
- Rechts der Isar Hospital

Geography
- Location: Haidhausen district of Munich, Germany

Organisation
- Type: Teaching

Services
- Beds: 1161

Helipads
- Helipad: Yes

History
- Founded: 1834

Links
- Lists: Hospitals in Germany
- Other links: List of hospitals in Germany

The Rechts der Isar Hospital (German: Klinikum rechts der Isar; "Hospital to the right of the Isar") is a hospital in the Haidhausen district of Munich, Germany. It is the teaching hospital and biomedical research facility of the TUM School of Medicine and Health.

== Overview ==
In Britain, the hospital is best known for being the place where the survivors of the Munich air disaster on 6 February 1958 were treated. Five people involved in the crash of British European Airways Flight 609 only had to be given injections for shock, but the 18 others were hospitalised for at least a few days with significant injuries. Two of them, Manchester United player Duncan Edwards and aeroplane co-pilot Ken Rayment, died at the hospital as a result of their injuries; 21 others had died at the scene or on their way to the hospital.

The other 16 injured people survived and most made a complete recovery from their injuries. The chief surgeon who saved the lives of many of the injured, Dr. Georg Maurer, was awarded a CBE for his efforts.

Michael Jackson was brought to the hospital on June 27, 1999, after crashing down on stage during the second MJ & Friends concert at Munich's Olympiastadion causing him severe back pain until he died in 2009.
