= Chris Köver =

German journalist and feminist

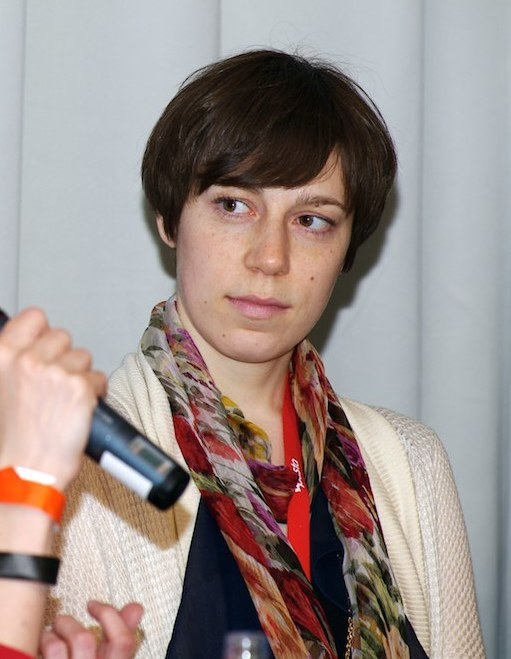
- Köver in 2010
- Born: 1979 (age 45–46)

Chris Köver (born 1979) is a German journalist and feminist. She is co-founder and co-editor of the feminist Missy Magazine, which has been published since October 2008. Since 2018, she has worked full time in the editorial department of netzpolitik.org.

== Life ==
Köver studied applied cultural studies and cultural studies in Lüneburg and Toronto from 1999 onwards. She completed a traineeship at Zeit Online from 2006 to 2008. In 2008, together with Stefanie Lohaus and Sonja Eismann, she founded Missy Magazine and continued to work as a freelance author, including for Die Zeit, Zeit Campus and Neon. She has written about pop culture, net culture and new technologies.

In 2012 Köver published the book Mach's selbst – Do it yourself for girls together with Sonja Eismann. The book gives practical and technical tips for DIY projects for girls, such as starting a band, planting a garden or writing a blog.

In 2014 Köver spent three months in the US on a Burns scholarship. From 2015 she was editor of the German-language edition of Wired, and in 2018 she moved to netzpolitik.org. Her topics there include state and private surveillance, artificial intelligence, digital violence and the surveillance of refugees.
