= CHE University Ranking =

Ranking of German universities

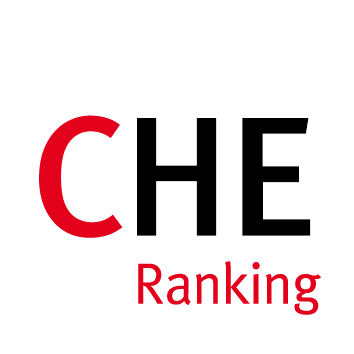
- Categories: Higher education
- Frequency: Annual
- Publisher: Centre for Higher Education
- First issue: 1998
- Country: Germany
- Language: German, English
- Website: studiengaenge.zeit.de/ranking

The CHE University Ranking (German: CHE Hochschulranking) is an annual ranking of German universities and colleges. It is a subject-specific, multidimensional system aimed at providing information for students, with its main emphasis on teaching, rather than research. Introduced in 1998 and published by the Centre for Higher Education in cooperation with Die Zeit, it is the most comprehensive ranking of its kind in Germany.

== Ranking ==
The CHE University Ranking is a subject-specific ranking. Each subject at each university is evaluated based on up to 37 criteria, e.g. overall study situation or research orientation. The decision to include which criteria is decided in consultation with representatives of the faculty conferences, expert associations and student representatives, and may differ depending both on the subject and type of higher education institution.

The assessed criteria are not weighted, nor combined to produce an overall ranking; CHE argues that there would no theoretical nor an empirical basis for such an aggregated value. Instead, the CHE University Ranking is multidimensional and solely shows the individual criteria. However, the ranking lists for each subject initially show a set of four to six pre-selected criteria, which may vary depending on the subject. The reader is invited to create their personal ranking.

Each evaluated criteria groups the subject at a specific institution into three groups: the ● top group, the ● middle group, and the ● bottom group, to minimize the risk of minor differences produced by random fluctuations being misinterpreted as real differences. The top and bottom groups are arranged to deviate to a statistically significant degree from the arithmetic mean.

Criteria include:

- Academic studies and teaching (courses offered, exams, interdisciplinary, study organisation, study situation, etc.)
- Job market and career-orientation (contact with work environment, job market preparation, etc.)
- Research (research reputation, citations per publication, doctorates per professor, publications per academic, etc.)
- Equipment (IT infrastructure, library, facilities, etc.)
- International orientation
- Result of study (graduates per year, exam results, period of study, etc.)
- Students (acceptance rate, gender balance, etc.)
- Town and University (population, public transport, tuition fees, etc.)

== History ==
In the late 1980s, newspapers started compiling the first university rankings in Germany. The Centre for Higher Education considered those methods inadequate and started constructing their own ranking based on sound methodology and with involvement of the universities themselves.

In 1998, CHE published its first ranking in co-operation with Stiftung Warentest. The first ranking solely analyzed the subjects business administration and chemistry. In subsequent years, the range of subjects analyzed has been continually expanded. From 1999 until 2004, the ranking was issued with the German magazine Stern. Since 2005 it has been published by the German weekly newspaper Die Zeit.

== Methodology ==
In contrast to other university rankings, the CHE University Ranking incorporates more aspects of teaching rather than research.

To evaluate teaching, it uses surveys of undergraduate and graduate students and professors. To evaluate research, it uses faculty surveys, bibliometric analysis, survey of university administrators and analysis of other data sources.

== Reception ==
The CHE University Ranking has faced criticism for neither publishing the data set itself, nor a detailed scientific description of its methodology. It has been criticised for creating false competition between universities. In particular, critics have pointed out several weaknesses in the CHE ranking:

- The criterion "recommendation of professors for a course of study" has only little significance, since it is doubtful whether external professors can actually express a qualified opinion on studying at another university.
- Research award winners are not taken into account at all in the research ranking.
- For reasons of information privacy, survey documents are distributed by the colleges or universities, rather than by CHE directly. This may allow for arbitrary manipulation by the colleges or universities.
- Ranking parameters and samples are set arbitrarily. For example, it is criticized that the samples are often too small to provide meaningful results.
- Multiple responses are not standardized, e.g. in the area of research strength by professors. This makes the results incomparable for the reader and leads to confusion, since a relative comparison is no longer possible - even though results are given in percentages.
- In some cases, there are considerable data gaps in the CHE ranking (e.g. number of graduates or average grade), so that the universities are not comparable.
- the perception of the students is given too little weight, and the questionnaires sent to students are in some cases suggestive.

In 2007, Switzerland and Austria withdrew from the CHE University Ranking, citing significant data and methodological deficiencies. In 2009, several departments of the University of Siegen announced they would no longer participate in the CHE ranking, so did faculties at Kiel University. The reason given was that the ranking "gives the ranking private company the opportunity to effectively control the public education system and remove it from democratic control". The ranking promotes inequality between universities and "the decoupling of research and teaching and thus contributes to the dismantling of the traditional strengths of the German higher education system". Some university departments, most notably in the fields of sociology, history, and media studies, have boycotted the ranking, leading to some subjects completely being excluded. Various scientific organisations, such as the Association of German Historians and the German Sociological Association, have spoken out against the ranking and are not taking part in it.

According to more recent criticism (2018) by the online portal Studis_Online, the rankings are increasingly being boycotted.

In contrast, the Educational Policy Institute has called the CHE ranking as "nothing less than brilliant" in a comparison of 19 international university rankings. Unlike "rankings with often questionable indicators", the German ranking actively involves the universities in its compilation and thus achieves a "high data quality at the institute level." In 2005, the European University Association claimed that "the system used by CHE to evaluate universities is probably the best model available in the world of higher education".
