= Campus Garching =

Science campus of the Technical University of Munich

Coordinates: 48°15′52″N 11°40′16″E

- Hochschul- und Forschungszentrum Garching
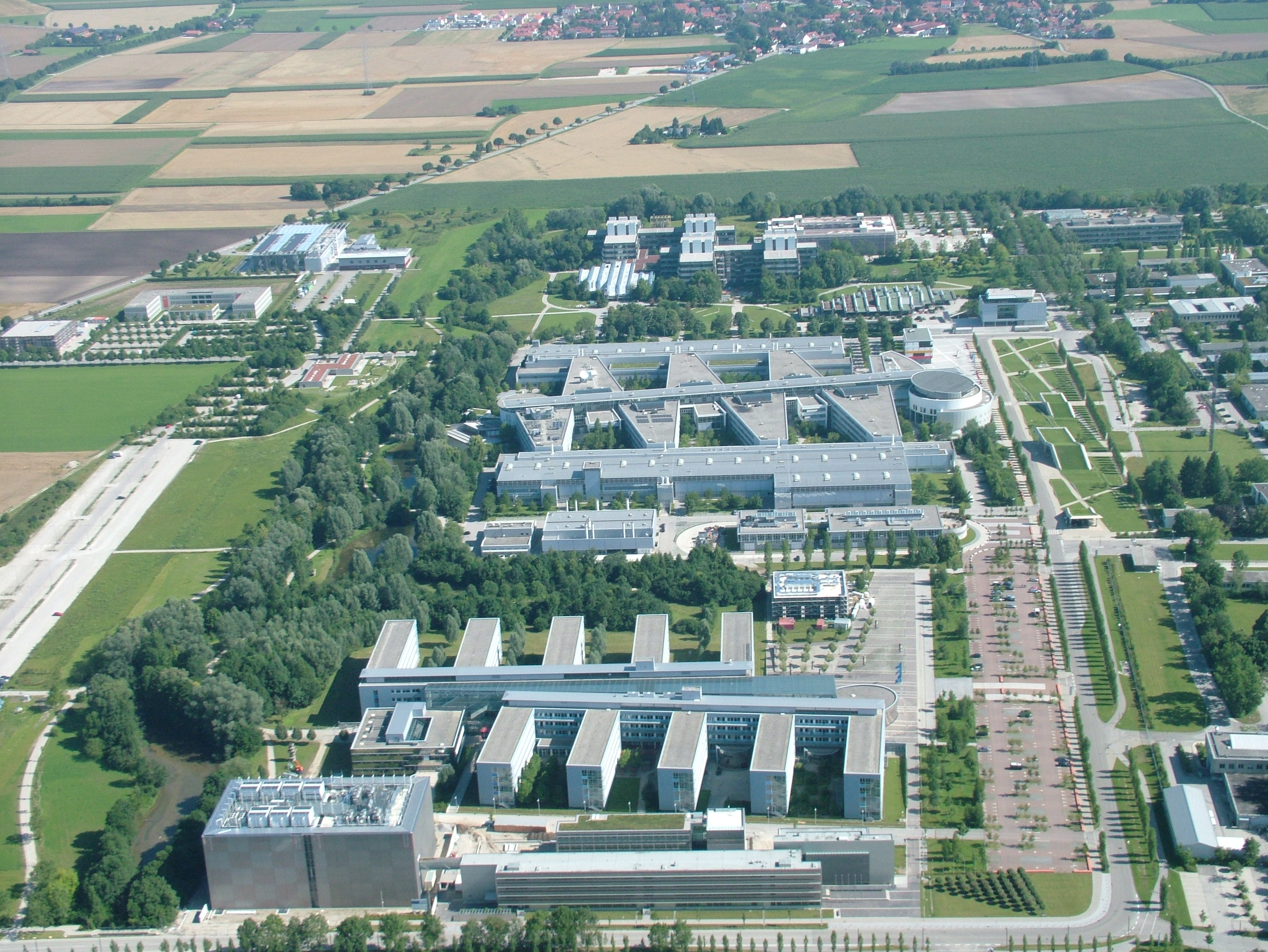
- Aerial view of the TUM campus in Garching

General information
- Type: Campus
- Location: Garching, Germany
- Opened: 1957

Other information
- Public transit: Garching-Forschungszentrum

Website
- forschung-garching.tum.de

The Campus Garching (German: Hochschul- und Forschungszentrum Garching) is a campus of the Technical University of Munich and a number of other research institutes, located around 10 km north of Munich in Garching. At the same time, it constitutes a district of the city. With more than 7,500 employees and around 17,000 students, it is one of the largest centers for science, research and teaching in Germany.

== Facilities ==
The Campus Garching is the largest campus of the Technical University of Munich. It is joined by numerous research facilities, including four Max Planck Institutes.

=== Technical University of Munich ===
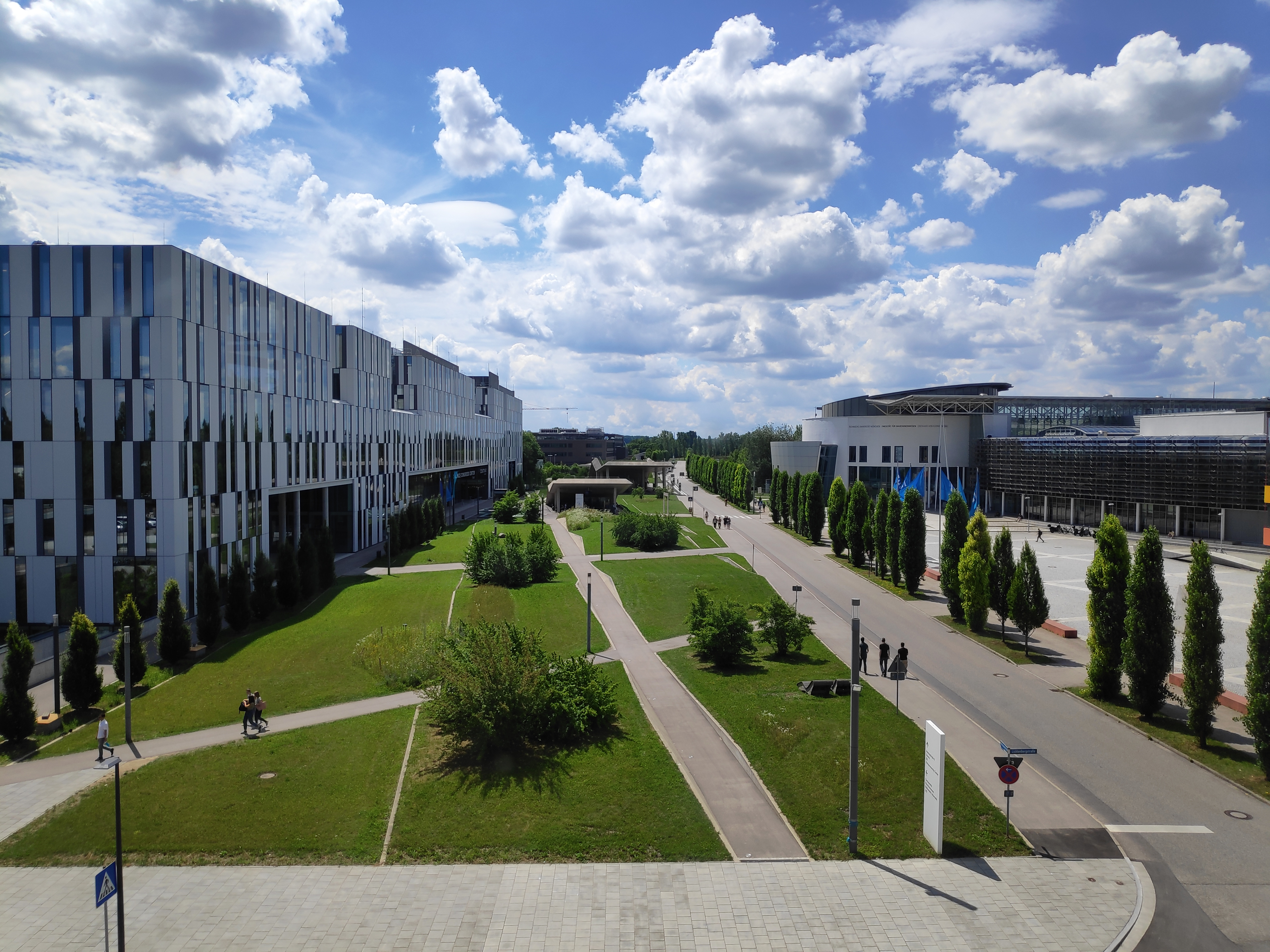
The central street of the Campus Garching with the TUM Department of Mechanical Engineering to the right (2022)

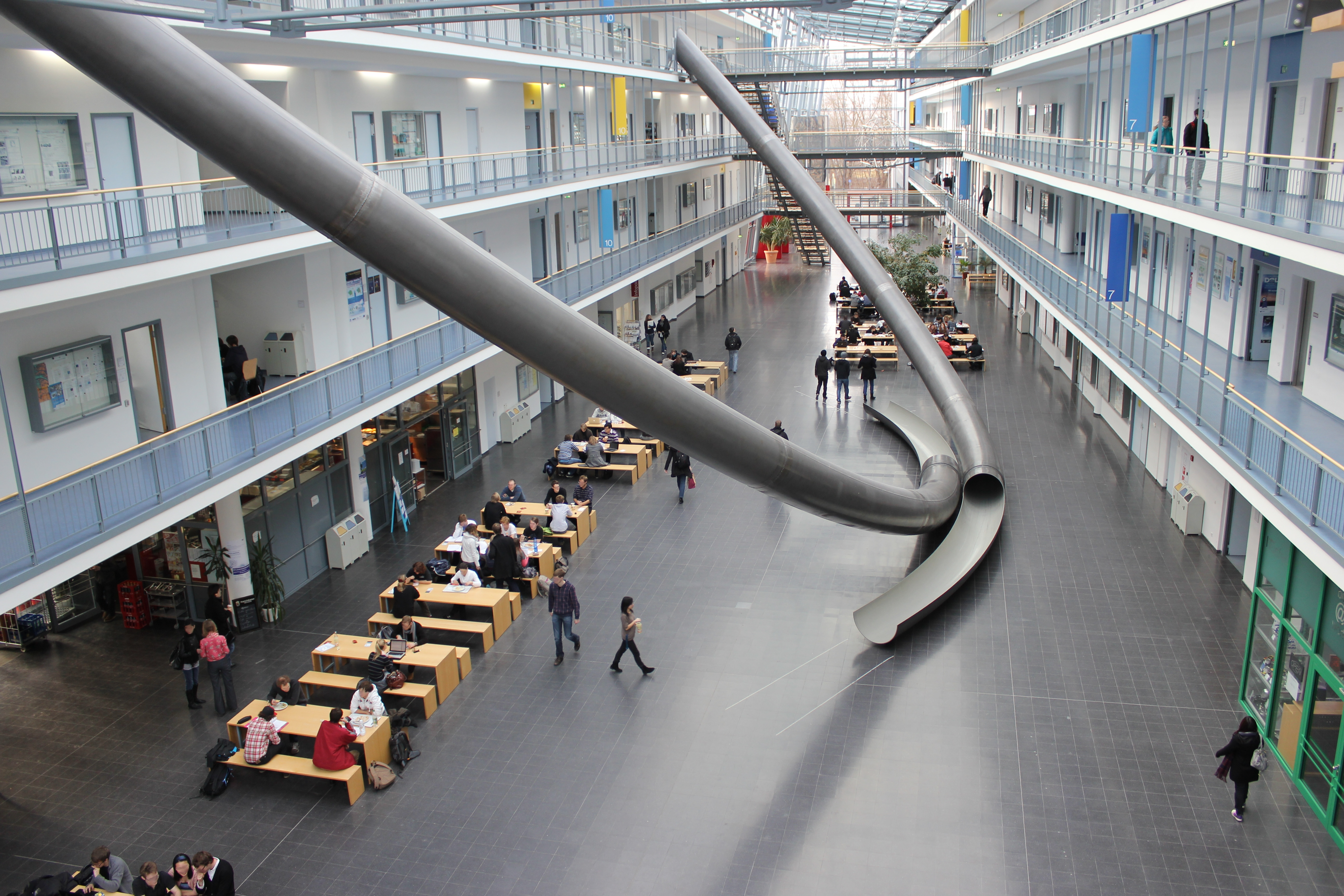
Interior of the faculty building for the TUM departments of Mathematics and Informatics

Five departments of the Technical University of Munich are located in Garching:

- TUM Department of Chemistry
- TUM Department of Informatics
- TUM Department of Mathematics
- TUM Department of Mechanical Engineering
- TUM Department of Physics

A new €540 million, 45,000 m^{2} building for the TUM Department of Electrical and Computer Engineering is currently in construction and the department is scheduled to move by 2025.

Research centers include:

- FRM II (Research Neutron Source Heinz Maier-Leibnitz)
- Munich School of Engineering
- Munich School of BioEngineering
- TUM Institute for Advanced Study
- Walter Schottky Institute
- TUM Graduate School
- Catalysis Research Center
- International Graduate School of Science and Engineering

Additionally, TUM operates a meteorological measurement tower, the Oskar von Miller Tower, and the TUM Fire Department on the campus.

=== LMU Munich ===
LMU Munich has numerous facilities on the Campus Garching, including seven chairs of the Faculty of Physics and sections of the Faculty of Geology.

=== Max Planck Society ===
Five research institutes of the Max Planck Society operate on the Campus Garching:

- Max Planck Institute for Astrophysics
- Max Planck Institute for Extraterrestrial Physics
- Max Planck Institute for Plasma Physics
- Max Planck Institute of Quantum Optics
- Max Planck Institute for Physics

=== Other research institutes ===
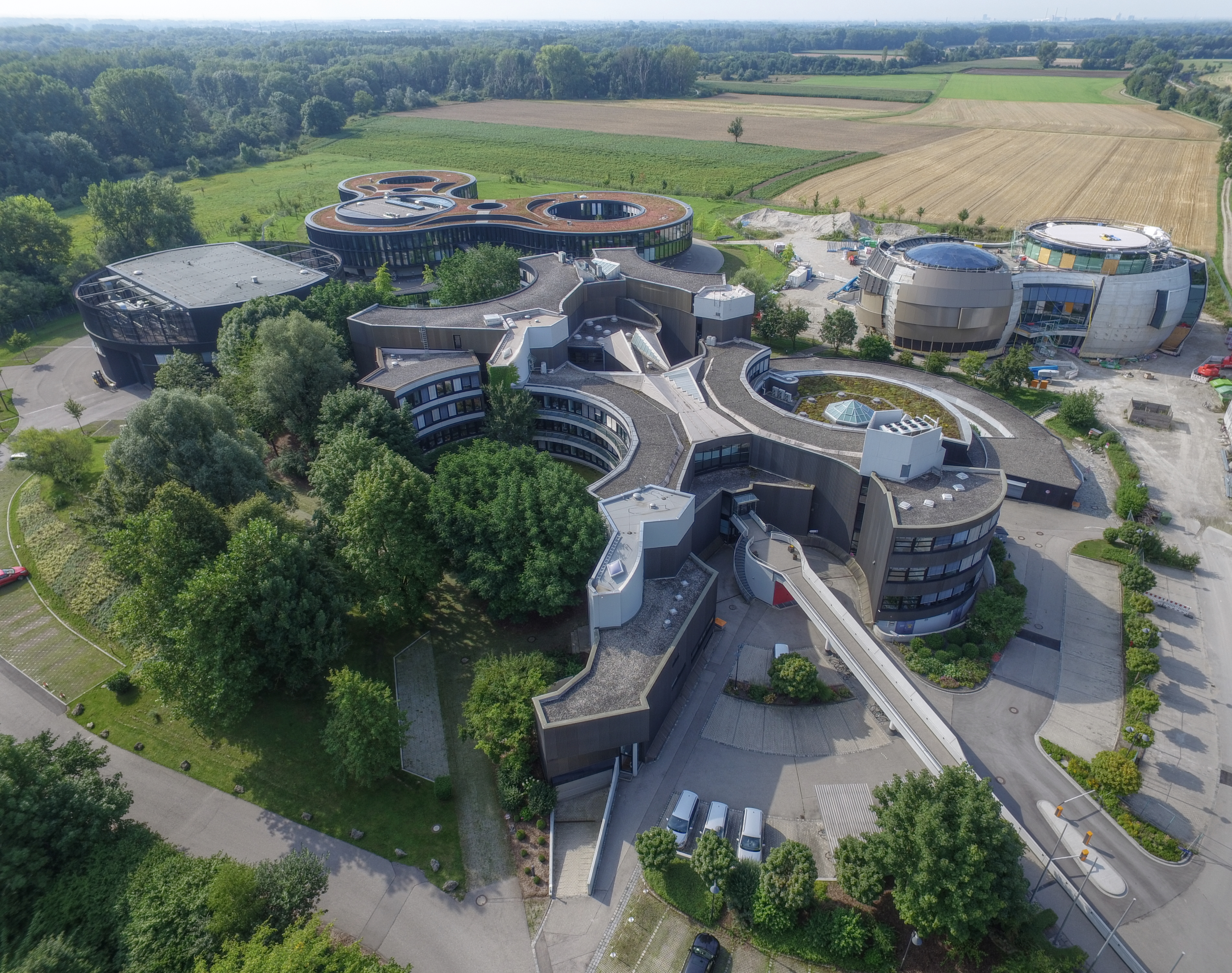
Headquarters of the European Southern Observatory

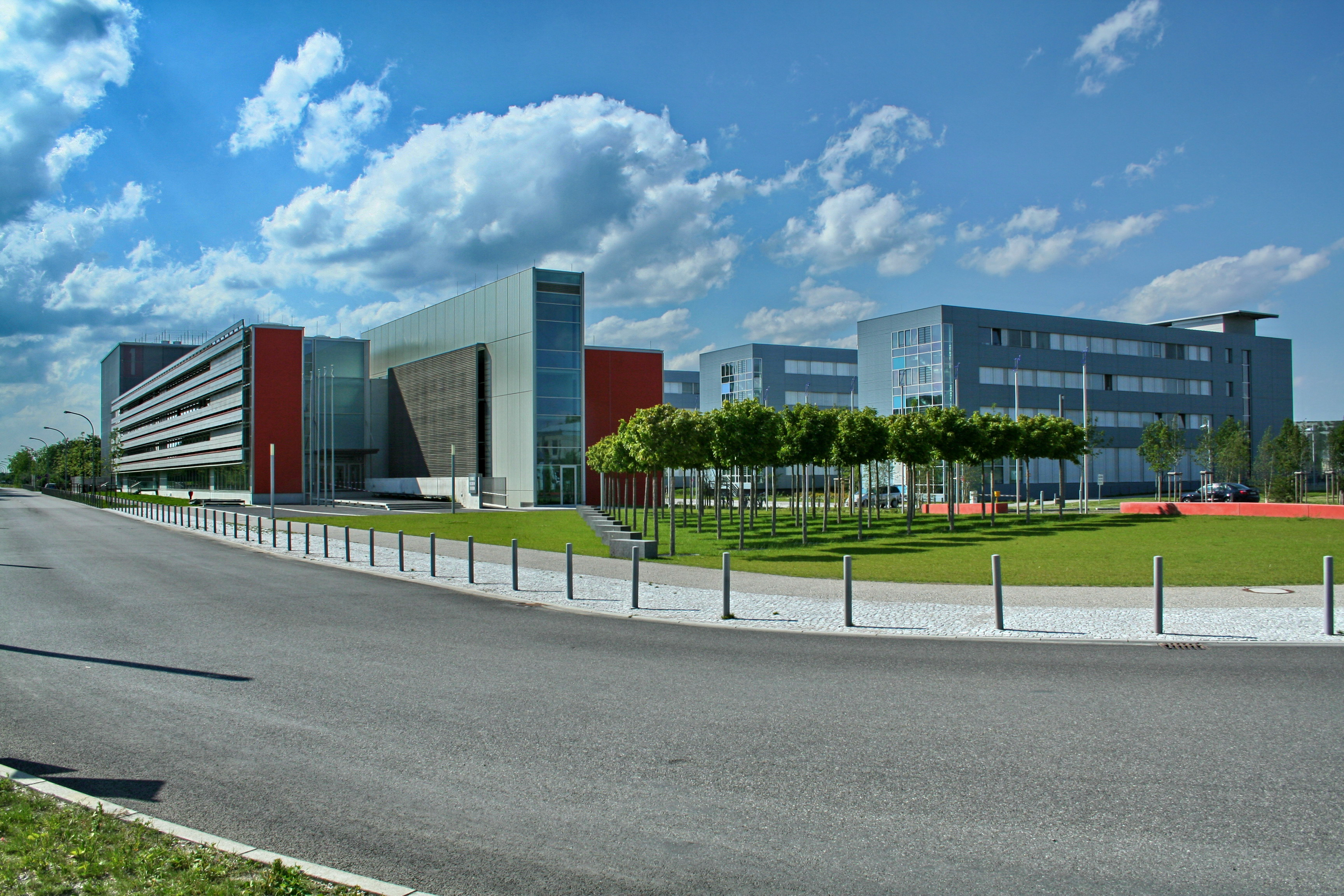
The Leibniz Supercomputing Centre (left) and the TUM Informatics and Mathematics building (right)

The headquarters of the European Southern Observatory and its Supernova Planetarium & Visitor Centre are located on the campus.

The Bavarian Academy of Sciences and Humanities operates the Leibniz Supercomputing Centre, one of the fastest supercomputers in Europe, and the Walther-Meißner-Institute for Low Temperature Research on the campus.

Five research clusters are located on the campus:

- Center for Integrated Protein Science Munich
- Munich-Centre for Advanced Photonics
- Nanosystems Initiative Munich
- Munich Cluster for Systems Neurology
- Excellence Cluster Universe

Other research institutes include:

- EUROfusion
- Bavarian Centre for Applied Energy Research

=== Companies ===
Companies that have established offices on the campus include:

- General Electric
- T-Systems
- Caverion
- SAP
- Siemens

=== Infrastructure ===
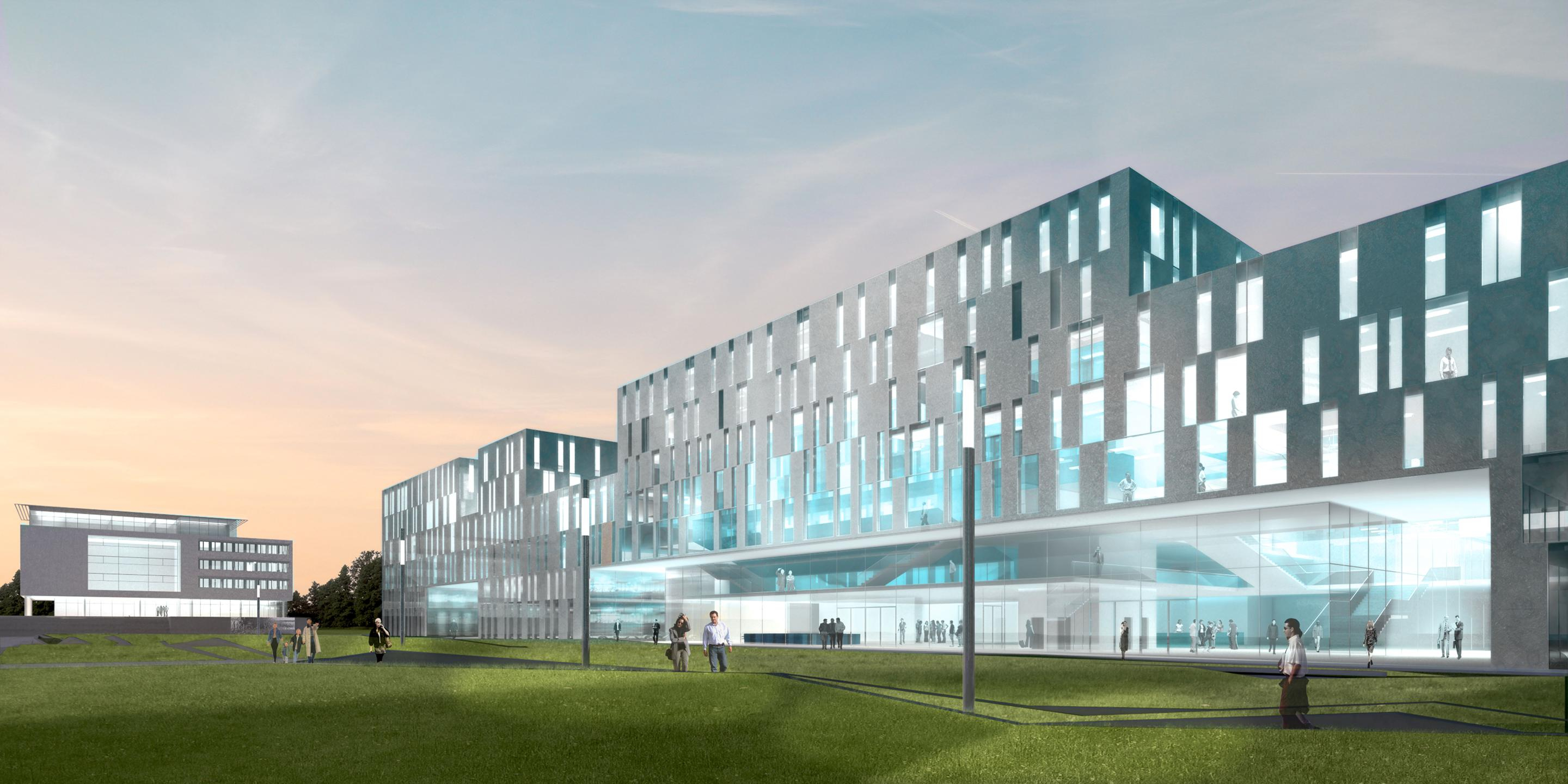
The TUM Institute for Advanced Study (left) and the new multipurpose building GALILEO (right)

In recent years, the Garching campus has started developing into a campus university. In 2019, a new €45 million canteen opened, capable of serving 7,300 meals a day. The first student residences are currently in construction.

A 36,000 m^{2} multipurpose building named GALILEO is in the final stages of construction. When completed, it will house offices, stores, restaurants, a church, a hotel and convention center, and guest apartments. GALILEO is being developed as a public–private partnership between the state of Bavaria and private investors.

A Hyperloop test track is currently being built on the campus, following the successes of the student team WARR at the SpaceX Hyperloop pod competitions, where they won all races.

== Geography ==
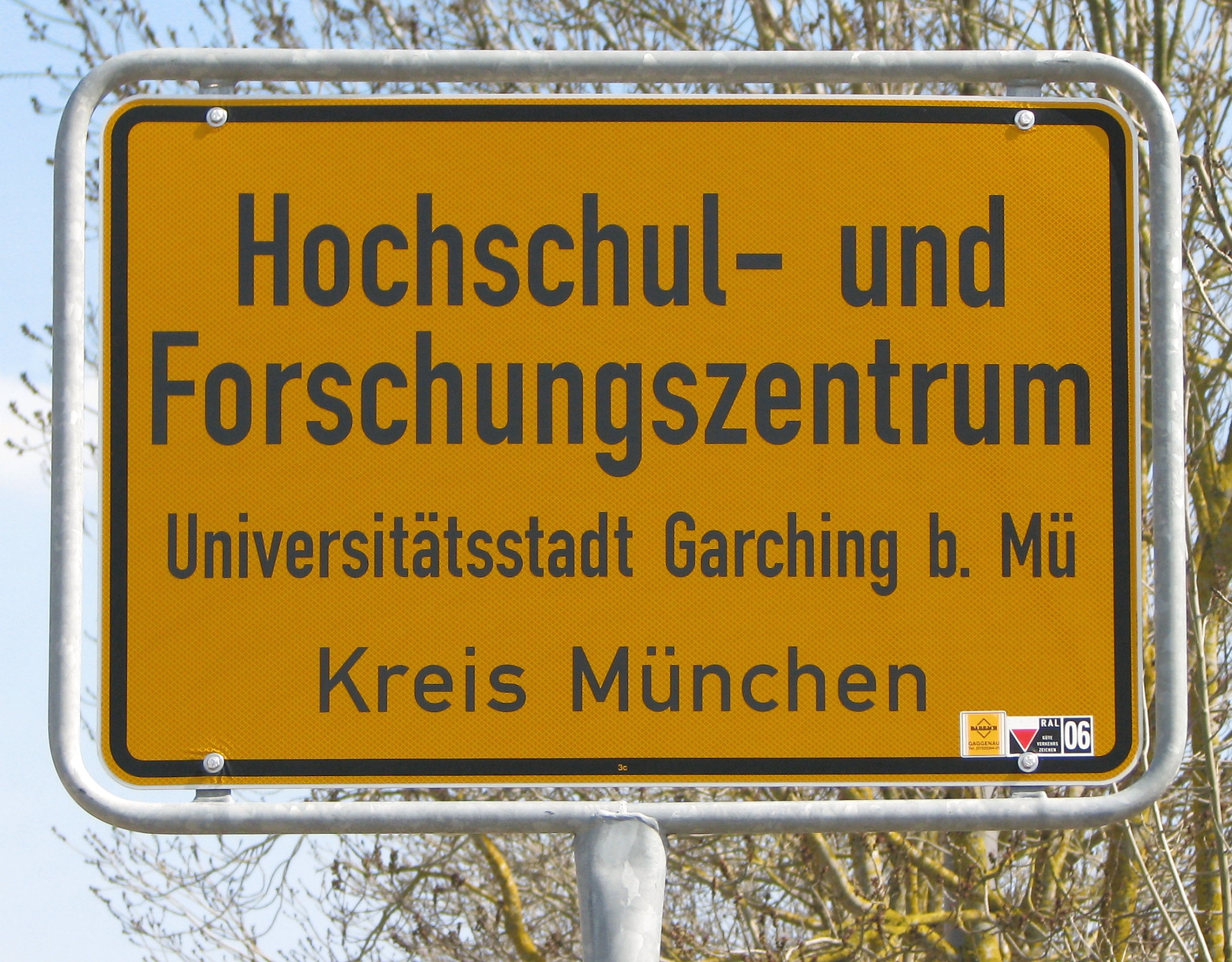
Town sign to the campus

The Hochschul- und Forschungszentrum Garching is a district of the city of Garching, rather than a single legal entity. It is located on the left bank of the Isar, about 2 to 3 kilometers northeast of Garching's city center, about 17 kilometers north-northeast of the city center of Munich, and about 16 kilometers southwest of Munich Airport. Located in the Munich gravel plain, the campus' elevation is flat throughout.

Two streams also run from south to north, fed by the Schwabinger Bach and the Nymphenburg-Biedersteiner Kanal. Both streams join northeast of the campus and flow into the Isar soon after.

=== Transport ===
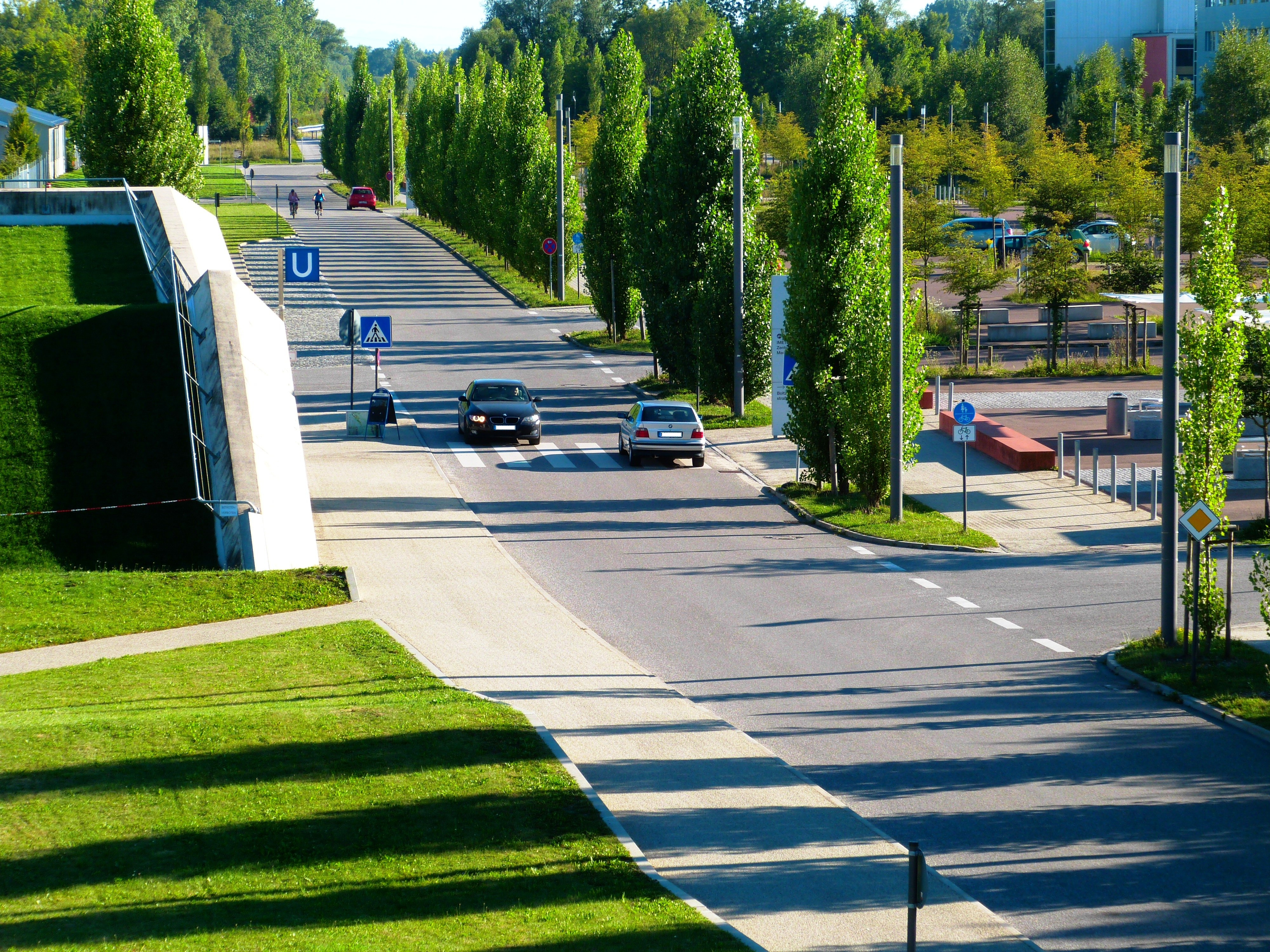
Exterior view of the U-Bahn station Garching-Forschungszentrum

The campus is located near the Garching-Nord exit of the Bundesautobahn 9. By bicycle, it can be reached from Munich via the Isarradweg (Isar Cycle Path) without road crossings; a connection to the Münchner Radschnellweg is planned. The streets on campus are named after important scientists: Hans Kopfermann, Karl Schwarzschild, Ludwig Prandtl, Ludwig Boltzmann, Walther Meissner, Georg Christoph Lichtenberg, James Franck, and Ernst Otto Fischer.

For a long time, accessibility to the campus by public transport was problematic. The Technical University of Munich operated its own shuttle bus between its main campus and the Garching campus. Public buses ran from the Studentenstadt U-Bahn station, and later from Garching-Hochbrück. Those who missed the last bus in the early evening had to rely on hitchhiking to get home, which earned the campus the nicknames Garchosibirsk and Novogarchinsk.

Since 2006, the campus has been connected to the Munich U-Bahn network with the Garching-Forschungszentrum station, with an interval of 5 minutes during rush hour. It takes around half an hour to get to the city center.

== History ==
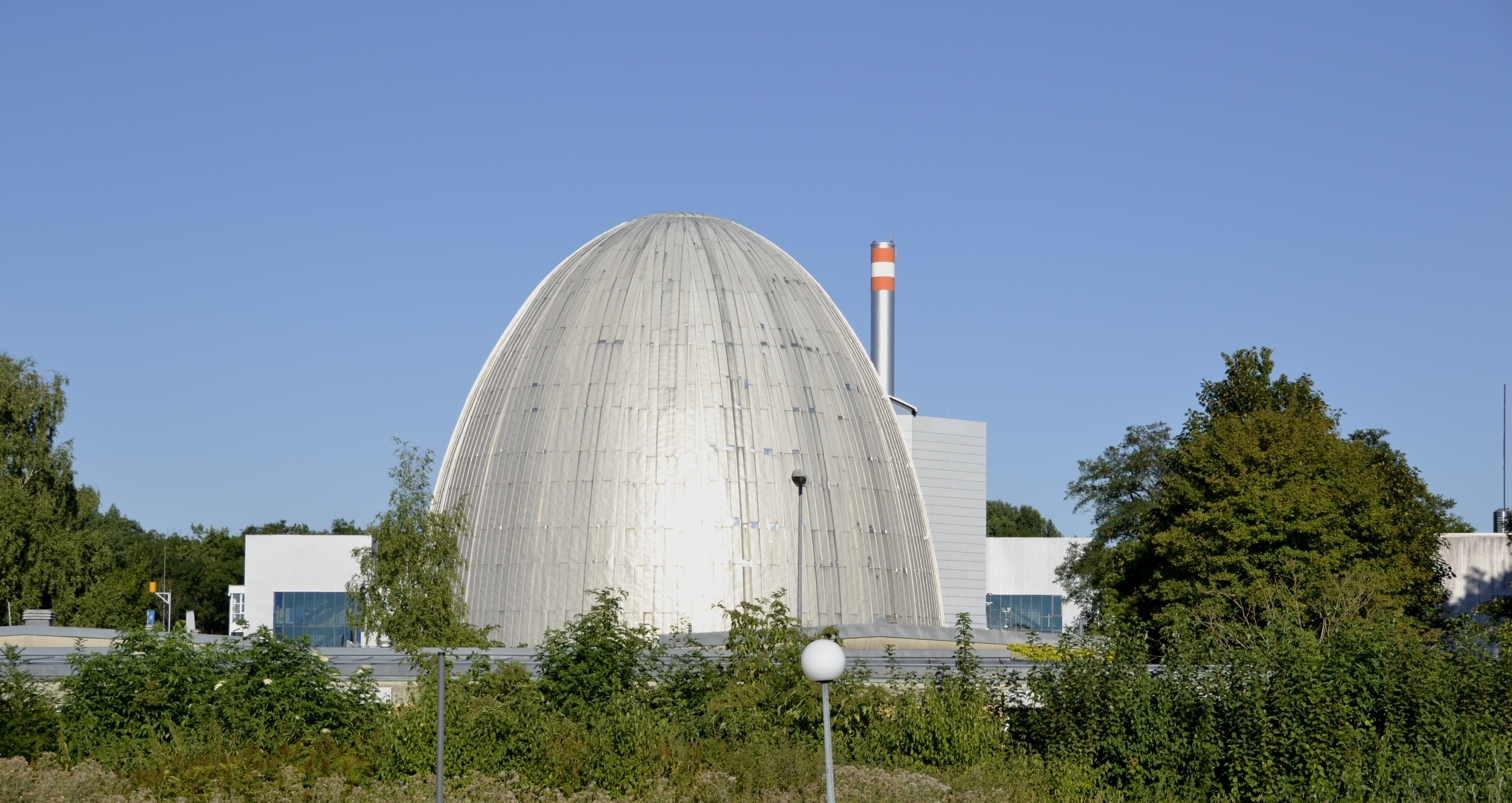
The research reactor FRM I, nicknamed the atomic egg, has become a landmark of the city of Garching, even being featured in its coat of arms.

In 1957, the first German research reactor, the 4 MW Forschungsreaktor München, marked the beginning of the Garching campus. In operation until 2000, its domed building in the shape of an "atomic egg" became a landmark of the city of Garching, and has been listed as a historical monument. Located right next to it, its successor Forschungsreaktor München II has been in operation since 2004.

The Max Planck Institute for Plasma Physics was established on the campus in 1960. In 1980, the European Southern Observatory relocated from Geneva to its new building on the Garching campus.

Since the 1960s, a relocation of major parts of the Technical University of Munich to Garching has been discussed. Until the decision to build a U-Bahn connection, the proposal had been repeatedly called into question. The Department of Physics moved to Garching in 1970, the Department of Chemistry in 1978, the Department of Mechanical Engineering in 1997 and the departments of Informatics and Mathematics in 2002. A new building for the Department of Electrical and Computer Engineering is currently in construction and the department is scheduled to move by 2025.
