= Lahti bus station =

Bus station in Lahti, Finland

- Lahden linja-autoasema
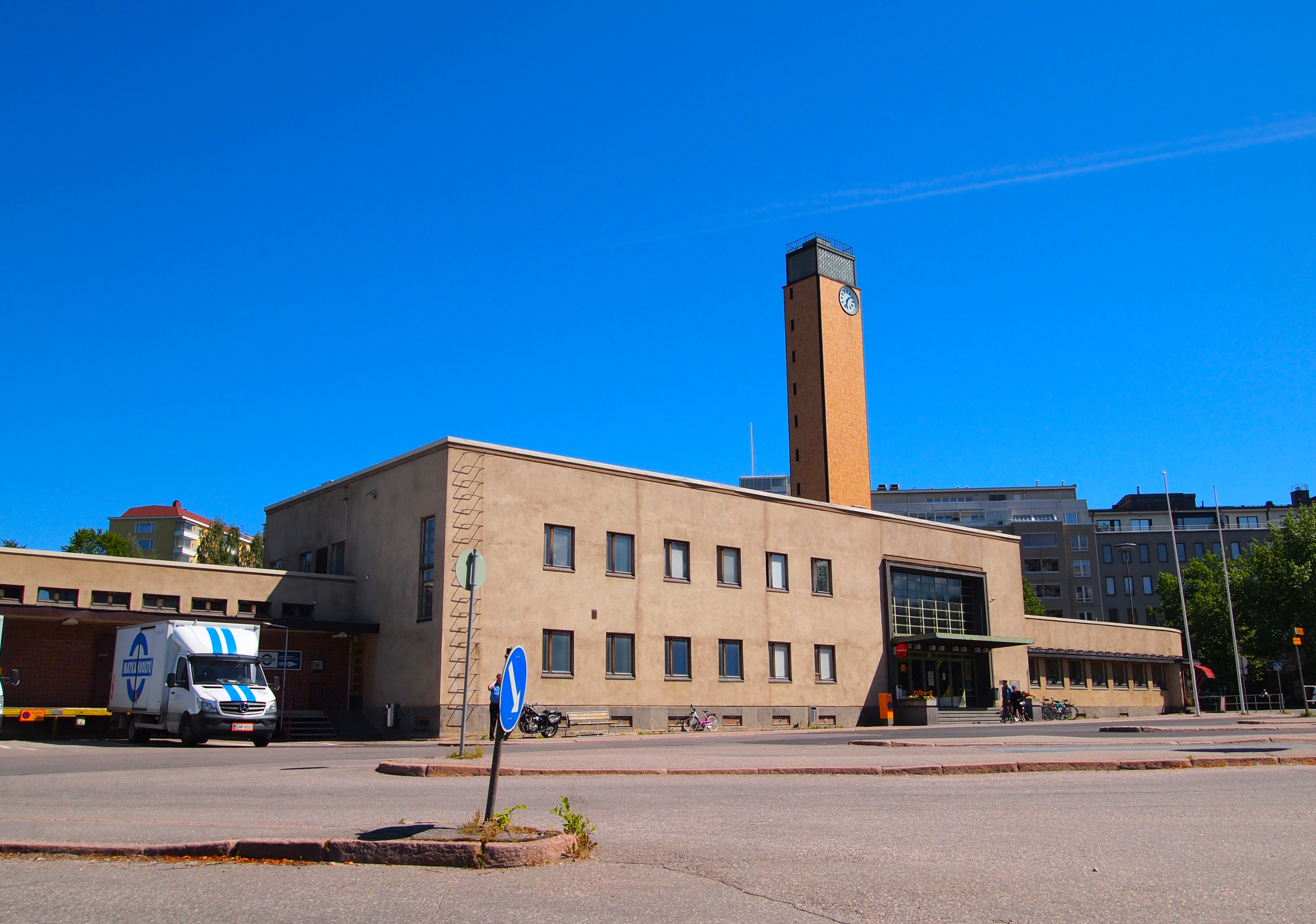
- Interactive map of the Lahti bus station area

General information
- Type: Bus station
- Architectural style: Functionalism
- Location: Jalkarannantie 1, Lahti, Finland
- Coordinates: 60°59′4″N 25°39′2″E
- Inaugurated: August 1939
- Closed: January 2016

The Lahti bus station (Finnish: Lahden linja-autoasema) is located in the Kartano district of the city of Lahti, Finland.

== Architecture ==
The Lahti bus station is a prime example of the functionalist era of station buildings in Finland. Its most notable feature is the 28-meter-tall (92 ft) clock tower, which remains a significant landmark in the eastern parts of downtown Lahti. The tower was used by the city authorities as space for advertisements.

City Architect Kaarlo Könönen had drawn influence from the Tampere bus station, which was in its final stages of its construction during his design process. This was evident in, for example, the indoor area being cleanly split in just three parts: the entrance hall, commercial area (used for shops as well as a restaurant), and freight wing. A notable feature of the entrance hall was a bench in the shape of a ring, in the centre of which was a small palm tree. The furniture for the restaurant was provided by Asko, a local factory based in Asemantausta.

== History ==
In the 1930s, the still fledgling town of Lahti made strides in improving the conditions for transit. Up until then, the Market Square had been the hub of bus transport in the town; however, with the continuous growth of bus transport over the period of pre-war economic upswing, it had grown cramped and incapable of handling the increasing volume of buses serving both local and long-distance lines. A plan for the building of a proper bus station had already been devised by architect Carolus Lindberg in the 1920s, who had proposed that the town authorities should handle the construction of a station building that would then be rented for use by the various bus operators.

In 1930, Shell Oy constructed a filling station by the Market Square, which was then accompanied by the spots at which buses arrived and departed; the company, however, refused go forward with building a full-fledged bus station. It would not be until 1935 that the town would begin negotiating with Matkahuolto about the station project. A total of three locations were proposed: its then-current location at the Market Square, the square near the railway station, and the junction between the roads of Lahdenkatu and Tiirismaan suurtie (contemporarily Jalkarannantie). The former two locations were deemed to be of inadequate size, especially with the prospects of reserving space for shops in the future station building, and the lattermost option was settled on in September 1938. In October, the design devised by Kaarlo Könönen was accepted. Construction work had already finished in the summer of 1939, and the station was opened for traffic on 20 August. An official inauguration ceremony was held on 4 September.

Architect Jouko Mattila designed an extension to the freight wing in 1990, making it stretch 18 meters further toward the northeast. The rest of the station was also renovated throughout the 1990s: for example, the tiled walls of the tower as well as the plasterwork on the main building were thoroughly revised. The indoor areas were restored to more closely resemble their original appearance, for example by changing out the lamps and furniture in the entrance hall.

Transport operations at the bus station ended in early 2016 after the expansion of the Lahti railway station into a travel centre was completed. Bus services ended on 31 January, and the Matkahuolto service point moved into a new office in the BW Tower on 1 February, having served customers for the final time on 29 January. Since then, the site of the station has been repurposed for other commercial applications.

== See also ==
- Lahti railway station
