= TUM Institute for Advanced Study =

German research institute

Coordinates: 48°16′01″N 11°40′19″E

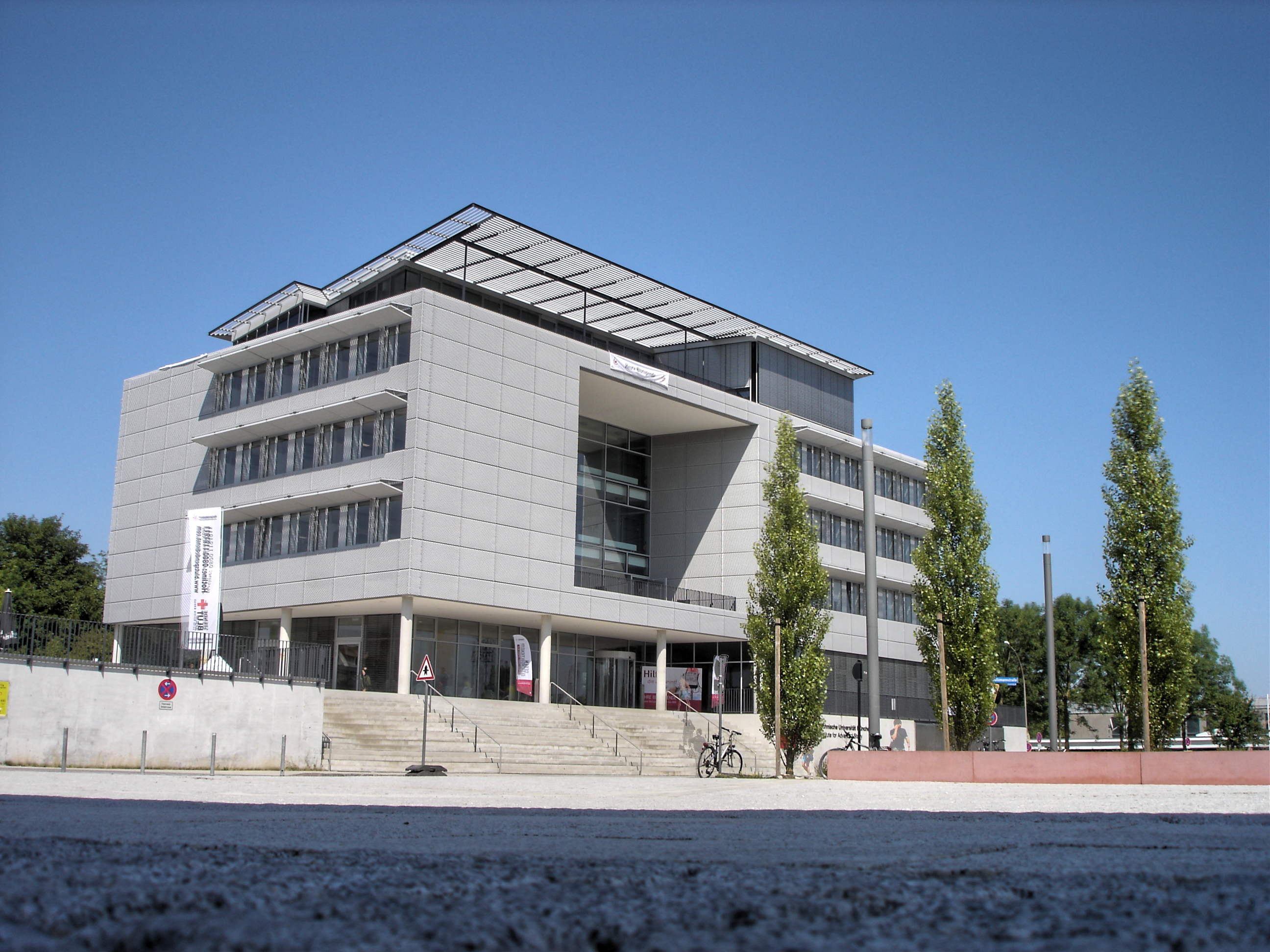
The building of the TUM Institute for Advanced Study in Garching

The TUM Institute for Advanced Study (TUM-IAS) is a scientific institution of the Technical University of Munich, conducting research in science, engineering and humanities. Its building is located on its Garching campus.

== Projects ==
The projects are from various fields of research ranging from science and engineering to the humanities. The institute is also supporting the International Expert Group on Earth System Preservation (IESP).

== History ==
In June 2005, the German federal and state governments agreed on an initiative to promote top-level research in Germany. As a result of extensive evaluation, the Technical University of Munich (TUM) was awarded the "elite-status". The TUM Institute for Advanced Study was the core for the concept of this competition. It includes engineering, sciences, industry research and reaches out to the humanities.
