= TUM Fire Department =

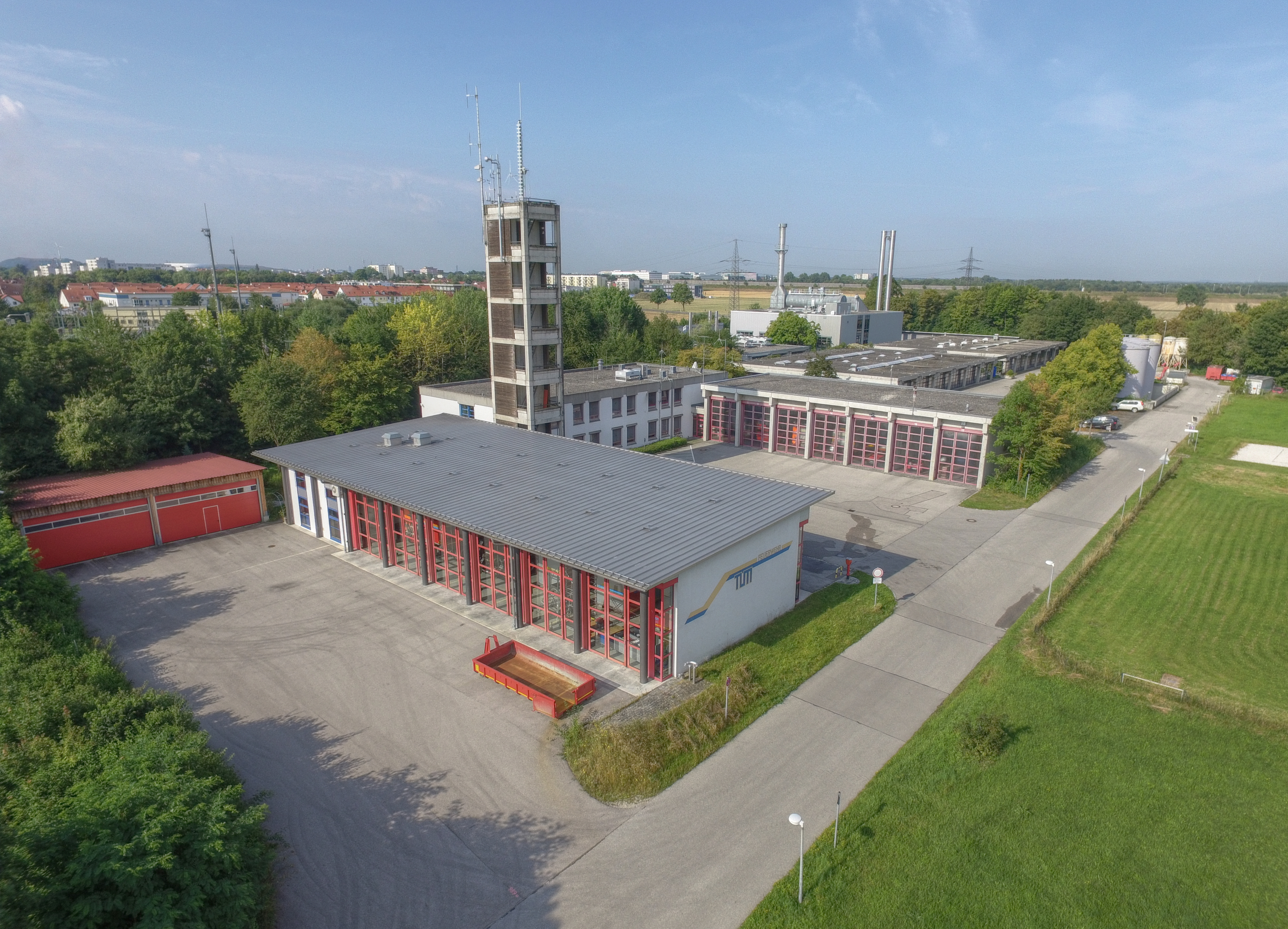
The TUM fire department

The Fire department TU Munich is a factory fire department at the Technical University of Munich. In addition to the fire department of the University of the Bundeswehr Munich, it is the only full-time fire department at a German university. It exists since 1979 and has 58 employees working in three shifts as well as in the day shifts. Its location is the research site of the TU in Garching near Munich. Organizationally, the fire department is part of the Central Department 1 - Unit 15 - of the Technical University of Munich.

== Purpose ==
The purposes of the TU fire department include, apart from fire protection and firefighting on the Garching campus, also general fire department-specific assistance, for example in traffic accidents. Their focus is on fire safety training and respiratory protection training for TU employees, knowledge of the fire alarm systems, maintenance of 3,000 fire extinguishers and checking hydrants on campus.

Since the former research reactor Munich (known as Atom-Ei) and the research neutron source Heinz Maier-Leibnitz belong to the objects that are supervised, the TU firefighters have a special training in radiation protection.

In major catastrophic events, the TU's fire department also supports units of the Garching Volunteer Fire Department and the Munich Fire Department and vice versa.

== History ==
In 1967, demands were made that the university should organize the fire protection and rescue service itself for the 1957 inaugurated research campus of the Technical University of Munich in the north of Garching, and therefore founded their fire department. Appraisals and legal examinations took place, until 1975-78 when the Faculty of Chemistry had a new building built. At the same time, nuclear legislations were tightened, which resulted in higher demands on the operational readiness of rescue services at the research reactor. For this reason, the head of the Munich Fire Department was appointed consultant and organizer of the development of a fire department for the TU. Which in turn, took the University fire demepatment back to the position that they could rely on civil service personnel and was considered equal to the public professional fire departments.

In 1978, the first operational and managerial staff were recruited and trained at the Munich and Augsburg professional fire departments. Part of the building of the technical center of the cogeneration plant was converted into a fire station. In May 1979, 18 of the 48 civil servants required, met the conditions to become active in the firefighting service. On 1 June 1979, the first watch of guards with six officials began their 24-hour service.

In March 1985, a newly built fire station could be occupied. In 1991, the university fire department was recognized as a plant fire department and received, in 1996, an expanded operations center. At the beginning of 1999, it was decided to reorganize the vehicle concept of the fire department in order to adapt it to changing requirements. In the course of this, a changeable charger system was introduced and a rescue vehicle was purchased. The plant fire department is a member of the Munich Municipal Fire Department.

== Vehicles ==
The fleet consists of:

- Einsatzleitwagen 10/1 (command vehicle)
- Mannschaftstransportfahrzeug 11/1 (transporter for the team )
- Hilfeleistungslöschgruppenfahrzeug HLF 40/1 und HLF 40/2 (fire engine to the technical help)
- Drehleiter mit Korb 30/1 (turntable ladder with basket)
- Ambulance 71/1
- Wechselladerfahrzeug 82/1 und 82/2
- Kleineinsatzfahrzeug 69/1 (very small emergency vehicle)
- Smart 89/1
- Teleskoplader (Manitou) (telescopic handler)
- Versorgungsfahrzeug (supply vehicle)

== See also ==
- Technisches Hilfswerk
