= Institute for Earth System Preservation =

Logo

The International Expert Group on Earth System Preservation, formerly the Institute for Earth System Preservation, is a nonprofit organization with an international network of scientists, engineers, entrepreneurs, and political administrators. IESP's stated goal is to develop practical applications of the sustainability of Earth system science.

== Activities ==
IESP organizes thematic-based conferences, workshops, seminars, lectures, and publications. IESP's definition of the Earth system is the sum of the planet's physical, chemical, biotic, and societal processes.

== History ==
In 2002, the Institute of Advanced Studies on Sustainability (IoS) was founded as a center of excellence in the field of environmental sciences and technology of the European Academy of Sciences and Arts (EASA). It is a registered nonprofit organization at the magistrate court of the City of Munich, Germany.

Following the workshop "The Art of Dealing Wisely with the Planet Earth," IoS established the International Expert Group on the Preservation of the Functionality of the Earth System as part of its activities in 2008. The discussions are summarized in the Zugspitze Declaration. Since then, IESP has been associated with the Institute of Advanced Study (IAS) of the Technical University of Munich (TUM) in Garching.

During the general assembly on October 6, 2015, the IoS changed its name to "Institute for Earth System Preservation", which became the "International Expert Group on Earth System Preservation".

== Organization ==
IESP is a registered nonprofit association and a collaborating institute of the European Academy of Sciences and Arts (EASA). An elected executive board legally represents IESP; its general assembly functions as the decision-making body. Its members are from the European Union, the US, China, and Russia. The IESP executive board is formed by Martin Steger, Jörg E. Drewes, Michael von Hauff, Wolfram Mauser, Klaus Mainzer (ex officio), and founding chairman Peter A. Poacher.
