= BW Tower =

- BW Tower
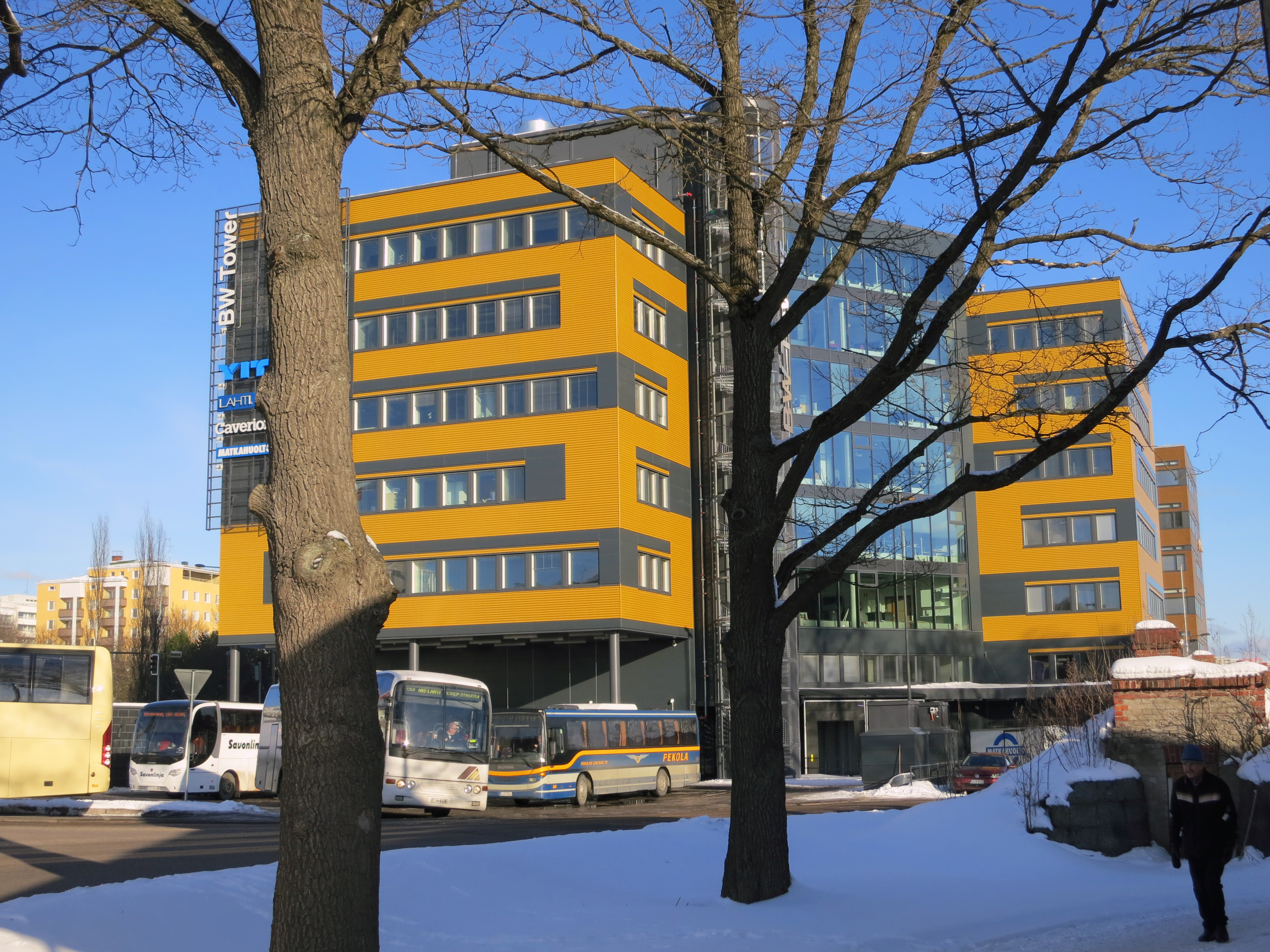
- Interactive map of the BW Tower area

General information
- Type: Office building
- Location: Lahti, Finland, Askonkatu 2
- Coordinates: 60°58′37″N 25°39′38″E
- Completed: 2015

Design and construction
- Architect: Arkkitehtipalvelu Oy Jyväskylä
- Main contractor: YIT Rakennus Ltd

BW Tower is an office building located in Lahti, Finland. The building was designed by the Finnish architecture company Arkkitehtipalvelu Oy Jyväskylä and completed in the end of the year 2015. The name of the building originates from the coat of arms of Lahti which depicts a burning wheel.

BW Tower has seven stories and an underground floor with the parking facilities. Organizations that have rented spaces from the BW Tower and operate there are Technical and environmental services of the City of Lahti, YIT, Caverion, Arkkitehtipalvelu Ltd and Matkahuolto. Matkahuolto which is a Finnish company focusing on bus and parcel services, operates on the ground floor of the building.

BW Tower is owned by the companies Fennia and Aktia Henkivakuutus Oy. The Finnish Metalworkers' Union also owns their share of the building. Aforementioned parties bought the building in 2015 for 22 million euros.
