= TUM School of Natural Sciences =

- Type: Public
- Established: 2021
- Affiliations: TUM
- Dean: Johannes Barth
- Location: Garching, Bavaria, Germany
- Website: na.tum.de

The TUM School of Natural Sciences (NAT) is a school of the Technical University of Munich, established in 2022 by the merger of various former departments. As of 2022, it is structured into the Department of Biosciences, the Department of Chemistry, and the Department of Physics. The school is located at the Garching campus.

== Department of Chemistry ==
=== History ===
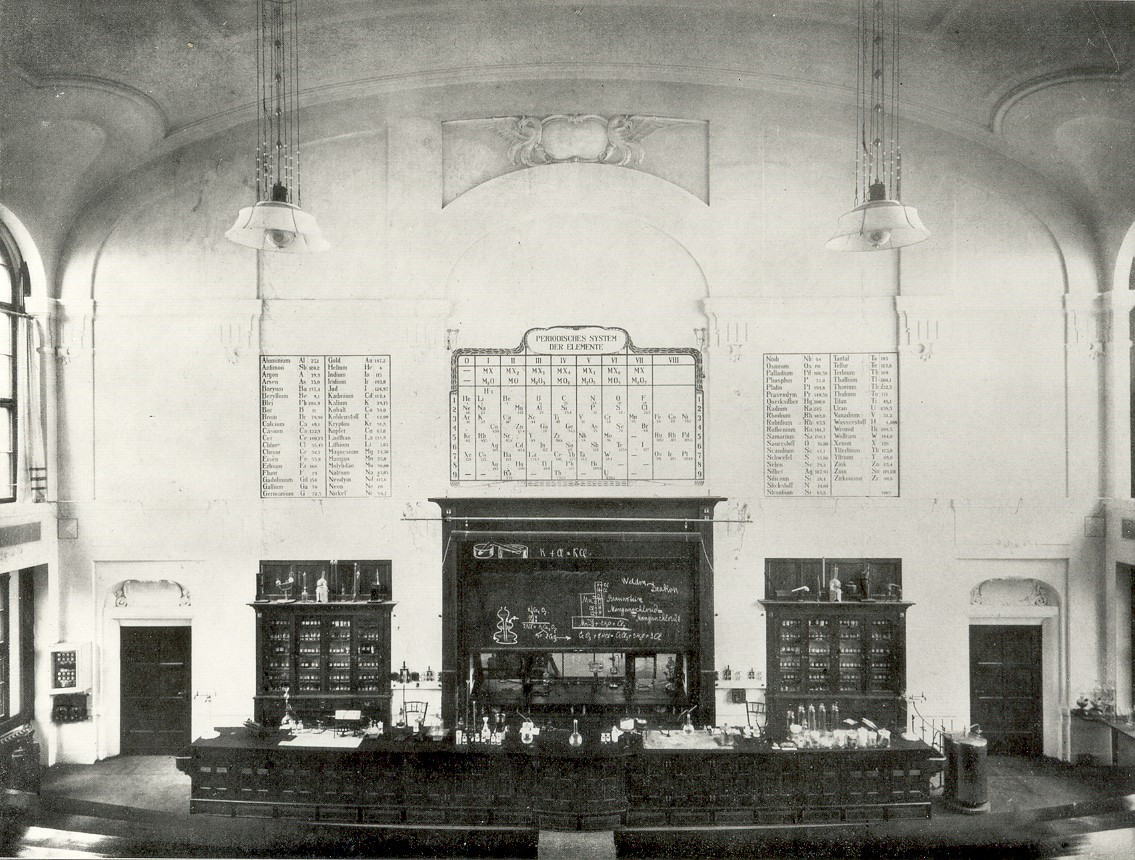
Lecture hall in the former Institute of Chemistry in 1909. An early version of the periodic table can be seen on the wall.

=== Chairs ===
As of 2020, the department consists of 24 chairs and institutes:

- Analytical Chemistry and Water Chemistry
- Inorganic Chemistry
- Inorganic and Organometallic Chemistry
- Inorganic Chemistry with Focus on New Materials
- Construction Chemistry
- Construction Chemicals
- Biochemistry
- Biomolecular NMR-Spectroscopy
- Biophysical Chemistry
- Biotechnology
- Food Chemistry
- Macromolecular Chemistry
- Medicinal and Bioinorganic Chemistry
- Organic Chemistry
- Pharmaceutical Radiochemistry
- Physical Chemistry
- Silicon Chemistry
- Synthetic Biotechnology
- Technical Electrochemistry
- Chemical Technology
- Theoretical Chemistry

== Department of Physics ==
=== History ===
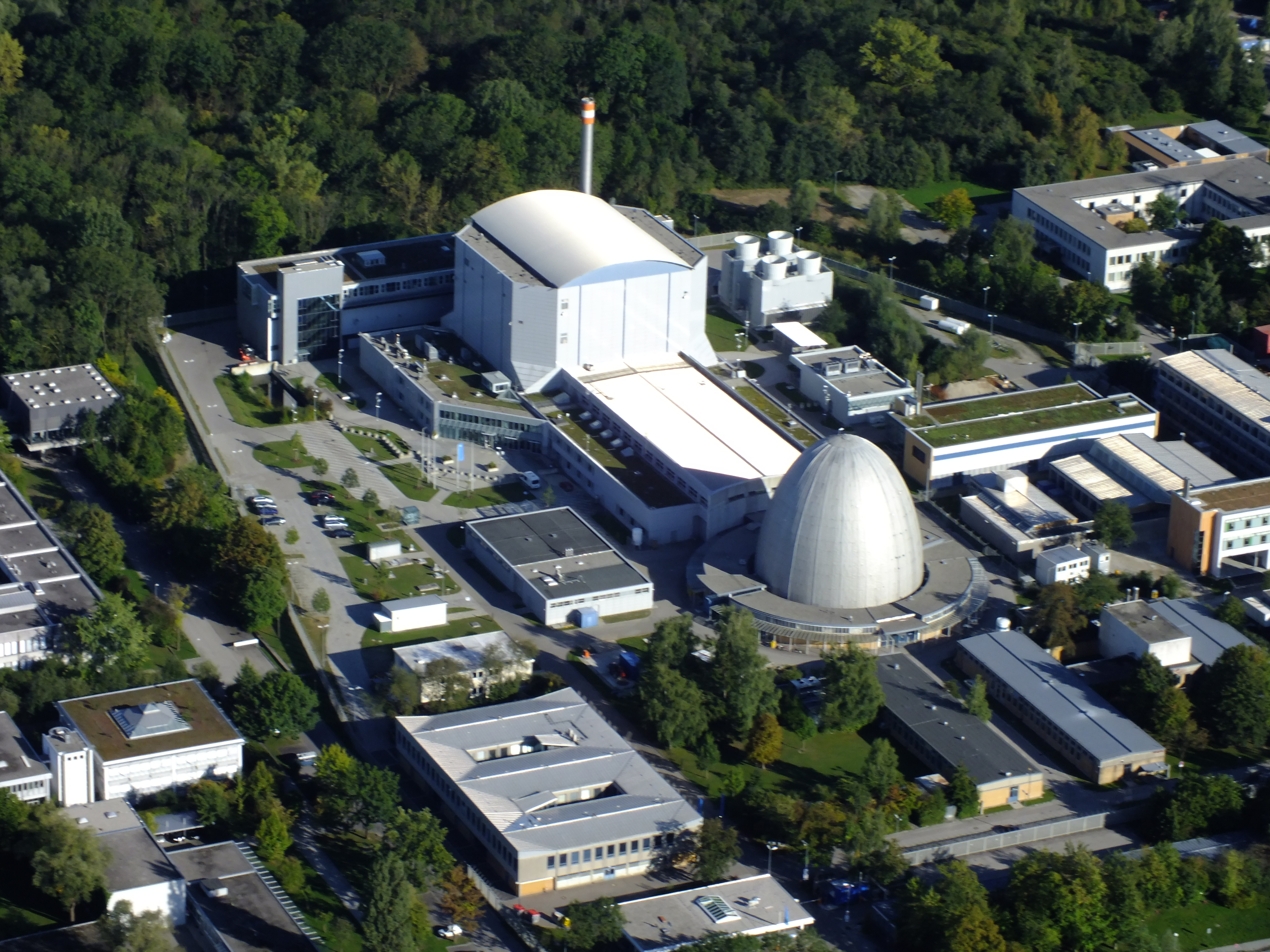
The Technical University of Munich has operated two research reactors on its Garching campus, the egg-shaped FRM I from 1957 to 2000 and the FRM II (with the curved roof) since 2004.

Physics was one of the founding disciplines of the Polytechnische Schule München in 1868, with the establishment of the Physikalisches Cabinet, later called the Physikalisches Institut. In 1902, the Laboratorium für Technische Physik (technical physics) was founded, spearheaded by Carl von Linde. In 1943, another institute, the Institut für Theoretische Physik (theoretical physics) was founded. In 1965, the three physics institutes were finally combined into the Department of Physics, as it exists today.

The TUM Department of Physics is notable for its operation of research reactors on the Garching campus, the Forschungsreaktor München from 1957 to 2000 and the newer Forschungsreaktor München II since 2004.

=== Research groups ===
As of 2020, the main research areas the TUM Department of Physics are biophysics, nuclei, particles, astrophysics, and condensed matter. The following research groups currently exist:

- Applied Quantum Field Theory
- Biomedical Physics
- Biomolecular Nano-Technology
- Cellular Biophysics
- Chemical Physics Beyond Equilibrium
- Collective Quantum Dynamics
- Dark Matter
- Dense and Strange Hadronic Matter
- Experimental Astro-Particle Physics
- Experimental Physics of Functional Spin Systems
- Experimental Physics with Cosmic Particles
- Experimental Semiconductor Physics
- Functional Materials
- Fundamental Particle Physics at Low Energies
- Hadronic Structure and Fundamental Symmetries
- Laser and X-Ray Physics
- Many Particle Phenomena
- Molecular Biophysics
- Molecular Dynamics
- Molecular Engineering at Functional Interfaces
- Nanotechnology and Nanomaterials
- Neutron Scattering
- Nuclear Astrophysics
- Observational Cosmology
- Physics of Biomedical Imaging
- Physics of Energy Conversion and Storage
- Physics of Surfaces and Interfaces
- Physics of Synthetic Biological Systems
- Plasma Surface and Divertor Physics
- Precision Measurements at Extreme Conditions
- Quantum Matter
- Quantum Technologies
- Semiconductor Nanostructures and Quantum Systems
- Soft Matter Physics
- Structure and Dynamics of Molecular Machines
- Technical Physics
- Theoretical Biophysics of Neuronal Information Processing
- Theoretical Elementary Particle Physics
- Theoretical Particle Physics at Colliders
- Theoretical Particle and Nuclear Physics
- Theoretical Physics of the Early Universe
- Theoretical Solid-State Physics
- Theory of Biological Networks
- Theory of Complex Bio-Systems
- Theory of Functional Energy Materials
- Theory of Quantum Matter and Nanophysics
- Topology of Correlated Systems

== Rankings ==
University rankings

By subject – Global & National
QS Chemistry 2023	22	1
THE Physical Sciences 2023	23	1
ARWU Chemistry 2022	51-75	1
QS Chemical Engineering 2023	=51	4
ARWU Chemical Engineering 2022	201-300	4-5
QS Physics & Astronomy 2023	=15	1
ARWU Physics 2022	76-100	6-7
QS Materials Science 2023	31	4

CHE Ranking 2020 – National
Chemistry
Overall study situation	● 2.2
Teaching of scientific competence	● 10/10 pts.
Graduations in appropriate time	● Median 6.0
Physics (undergraduate)
Support in studies	● 2.2
Coursed offered	● 2.3
Graduations in appropriate time	● 90.2%

The Department of Chemistry is regarded as one of the best chemistry departments in Germany. According to the QS rankings, it is ranked No. 22 in the world and No. 1 in Germany, and in the ARWU rankings, it is ranked within No. 51–75 in the world and No. 1 in Germany. In the national 2020 CHE University Ranking, the department is rated in the top group for the majority of criteria, including teaching, study organization, and overall study situation.

The Department of Physics is ranked 1st in Germany and 15th in the world in the QS World University Rankings. According to ARWU, the department is ranked within No. 6–7 in Germany and No. 76–100 in the world.

The Times Higher Education World University Rankings does not provide individual subject rankings, but TUM generally ranks 23rd globally and 1st nationally in the physical sciences.

== Notable people ==
7 laureates of the Nobel Prize in Chemistry have studied, taught or researched at TUM:

- 1927 – Heinrich Otto Wieland (bile acids)
- 1930 – Hans Fischer (constitution and synthesis of haemin and chlorophyll)
- 1973 – Ernst Otto Fischer (sandwich complexes)
- 1988 – Johann Deisenhofer and Robert Huber (crystal structure of an integral membrane protein)
- 2007 – Gerhard Ertl (chemical processes on solid surfaces)
- 2017 – Joachim Frank (cryo-electron microscopy)

6 laureates of the Nobel Prize in Physics have studied, taught or researched at TUM:

- 1961 – Rudolf L. Mößbauer (Mößbauer effect)
- 1985 – Klaus von Klitzing (quantum Hall effect)
- 1986 – Ernst Ruska (electron microscope)
- 1989 – Wolfgang Paul (ion trap)
- 2001 – Wolfgang Ketterle (Bose-Einstein condensation in dilute gases of alkali atoms)
- 2022 – Anton Zeilinger (quantum information science)

Laureates of the Gottfried Wilhelm Leibniz Prize include Gerhard Abstreiter, Martin Beneke, Franz Pfeiffer and Hendrik Dietz.
