= Kaarlo Könönen =

Finnish architect

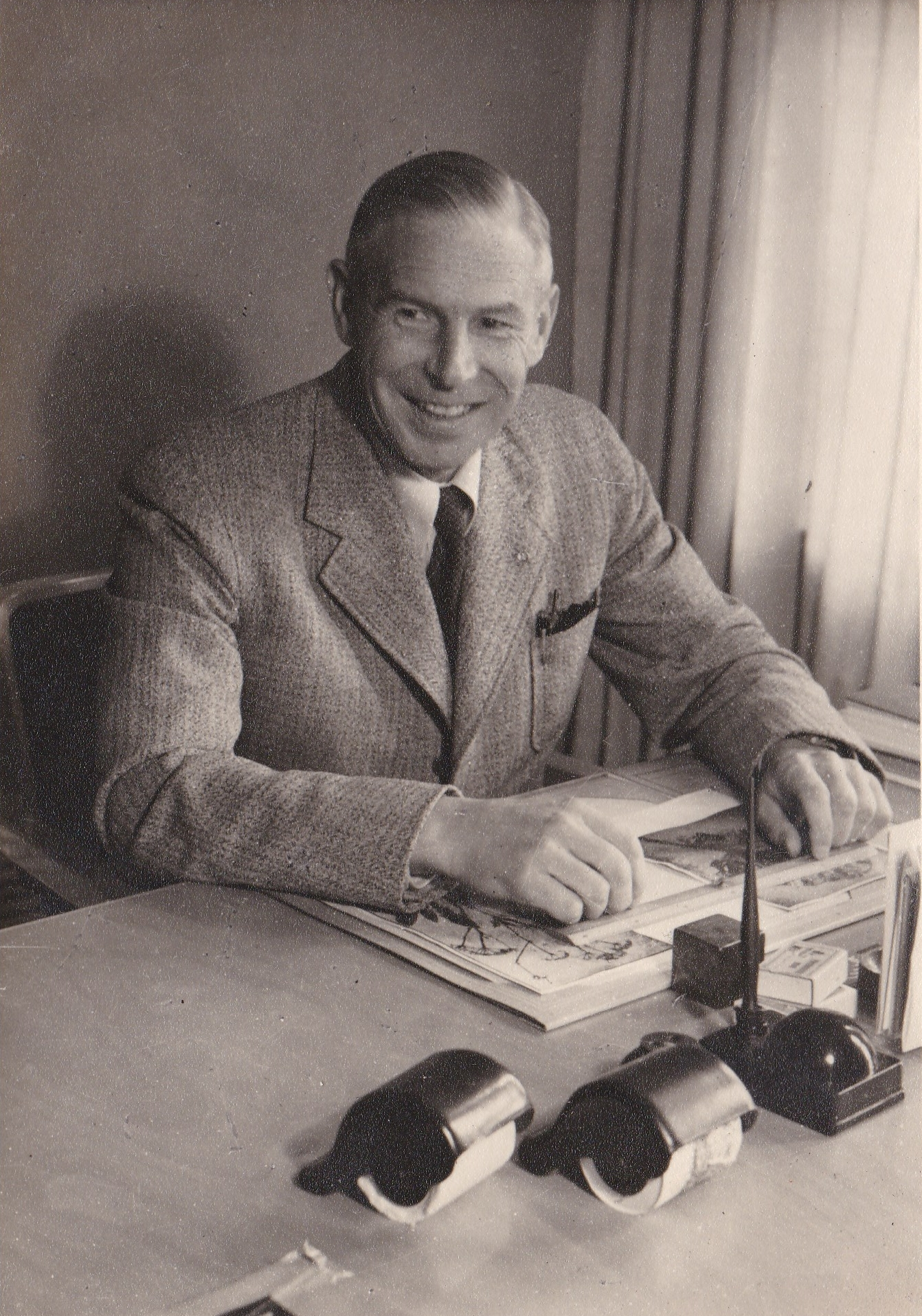
- Kaarlo Könönen at his desk. Date unknown.
- Born: Kaarlo Könönen; 12 December 1892; Hamina, Grand Duchy of Finland, Russian Empire
- Died: 2 August 1965 (aged 72); Lahti, Finland
- Occupation: Architect
- Buildings: Kotkansaari hospital, Vuorelankulma, Lahti bus station, Heinola water tower

Kaarlo Könönen (December 12, 1892, in Hamina – August 2, 1965, in Lahti) was a Finnish architect. He graduated from the Helsinki University of Technology in 1919. From 1922 to 1923, Könönen worked as a city architect in Kotka. To Kotkansaari he designed several apartment buildings representing 1920s classicism. The most famous one being Vuorelankulma, completed in 1927. He also worked as an architect for the Finland's Ministry of Defense in 1924. From 1925 to 1929, Könönen worked in private architectural firms, one of those was Eliel Saarinen's office in Hvitträsk.

Könönen worked as a city architect in Lahti from 1929 to 1955. During that time his style changed closer to functionalism. His well-known works include Lahti bus station (1939), the extension of Lahti Town Hall (1934), the residential areas of Vesterås and Tapanila and the Heinola Water Tower (1951).

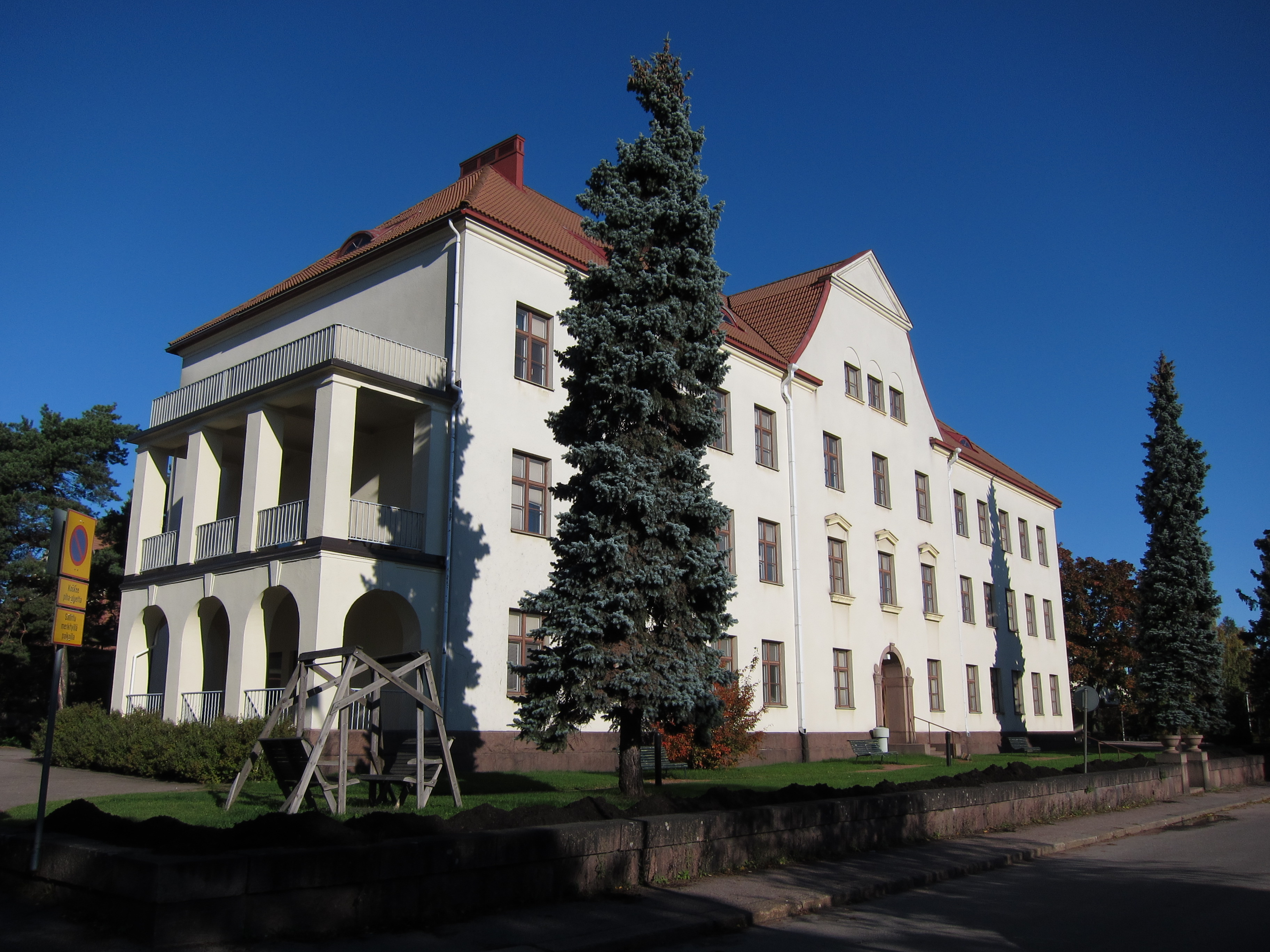
The hospital of Kotkansaari designed by Kaarlo Könönen in 1925.

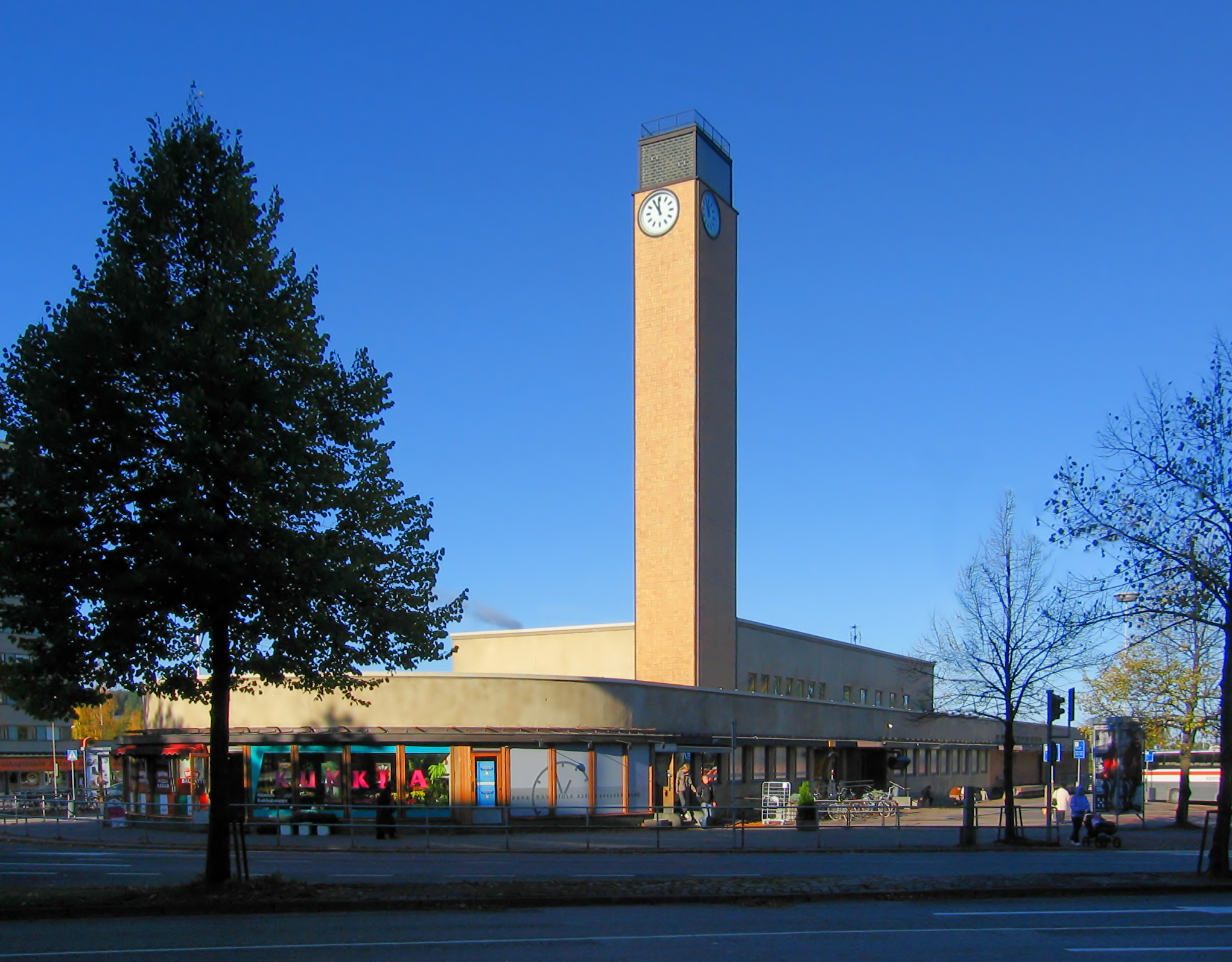
Lahti bus station, built in 1939.
