= ESO Supernova Planetarium & Visitor Centre =

Astronomy center

- Established: 2018
- Location: Garching bei München, Germany
- Coordinates: 48°15′34.0″N 11°40′13.2″E
- Type: Planetarium, Exhibition Centre
- Director: Tania Johnston
- Architect: Bernhardt + Partner
- Owner: European Southern Observatory
- Public transit access: Garching-Forschungszentrum (Munich U-Bahn), Ismaning (bus 230), Oberschleißheim Sonnenstraße (bus 292), Neufahrn bei Freising (bus 690)
- Website: supernova.eso.org

Time-lapse of the construction of the visitor centre.

In this animation we break free from the ESO Supernova, rise above Garching, and then Munich and the Earth itself. The viewer accelerates out of the Solar System and then the Milky Way, finally revealing vast numbers of galaxies.

The ESO Supernova Planetarium & Visitor Centre is an astronomy centre located at the site of the European Southern Observatory (ESO) Headquarters in Garching bei München. It offers exhibitions, guided tours and planetarium shows that feature observations made by the telescopes of the European Southern Observatory.

The ESO Supernova is a non-profit educational facility which receives no state funding other than through ESO’s normal operating budget. Entrance to the centre and all activities are free of charge throughout 2018. From 2019, tickets will be sold for activities like planetarium shows, tours and events. The entrance to the exhibition and all educational activities will remain free.

== Organisation ==
The building is a donation from the Klaus Tschira Stiftung (KTS) and the Heidelberg Institute for Theoretical Studies (HITS) which ESO accepted in December 2013. It is operated and managed by the European Southern Observatory. The coordinator is Tania Johnston.

== Science campus Garching ==
The ESO Supernova Planetarum & Visitor Centre is located at the Science Campus Garching. The campus is home to LMU Munich and Technical University of Munich, in addition to more than 80 independent scientific institutions and international science companies, 6 000 staff members and 14 000 students. The work at the Science Campus Garching covers fundamental research as well as high-tech developments.

== Architecture ==
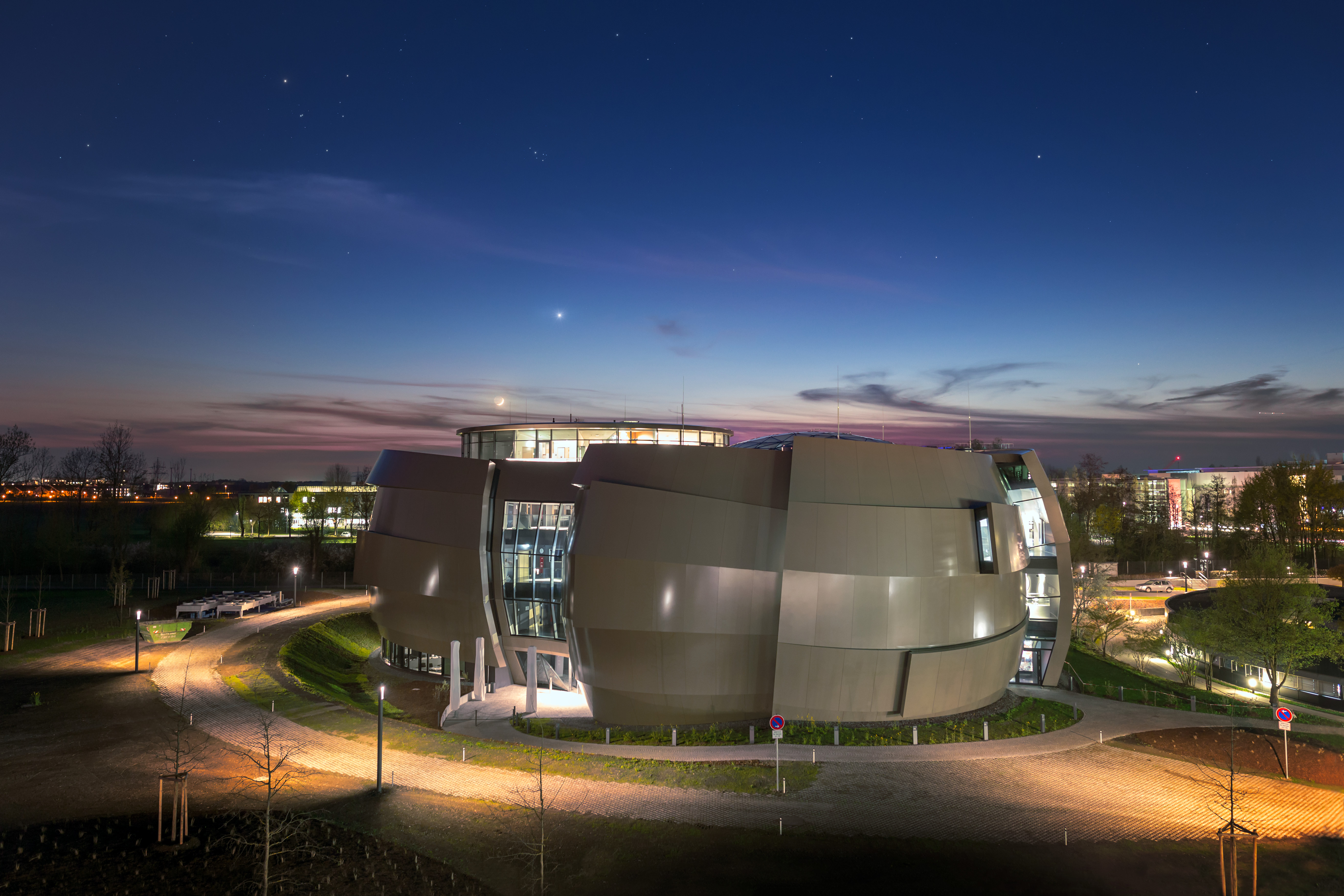
ESO Supernova building.

The visitor centre was designed by the architects Bernhardt + Partner, that already designed the Haus der Astronomie, a centre for astronomy education and outreach. The design of the ESO Supernova resembles that of a close double-star system with one star transferring mass to its companion. This set-up will ultimately lead to the heavier component exploding as a supernova, briefly becoming as bright as the light of all the stars in the Milky Way combined.

== Planetarium ==
Ultra HD photograph captures Paranal Observatory in a 360 degree fish-eye (fulldome) view.

The visitor centre hosts a 14-metre diameter, tilted planetarium dome, able to accommodate up to 109 visitors. The planetarium has 5 Velvet projectors with a total resolution of 4250 pixels. It is driven by the software packages Digistar 6, Uniview, Powerdome, World Wide Telescope, Resolume and Space Engine.

The centre will display planetarium shows produced by external producers and original shows produced by ESO. The fulldome material that ESO is developing for ESO Supernova is available to other planetariums for free, released under the Creative Commons 4.0 License. It is available together with subtitles and narration translated into several languages.

== Exhibitions ==
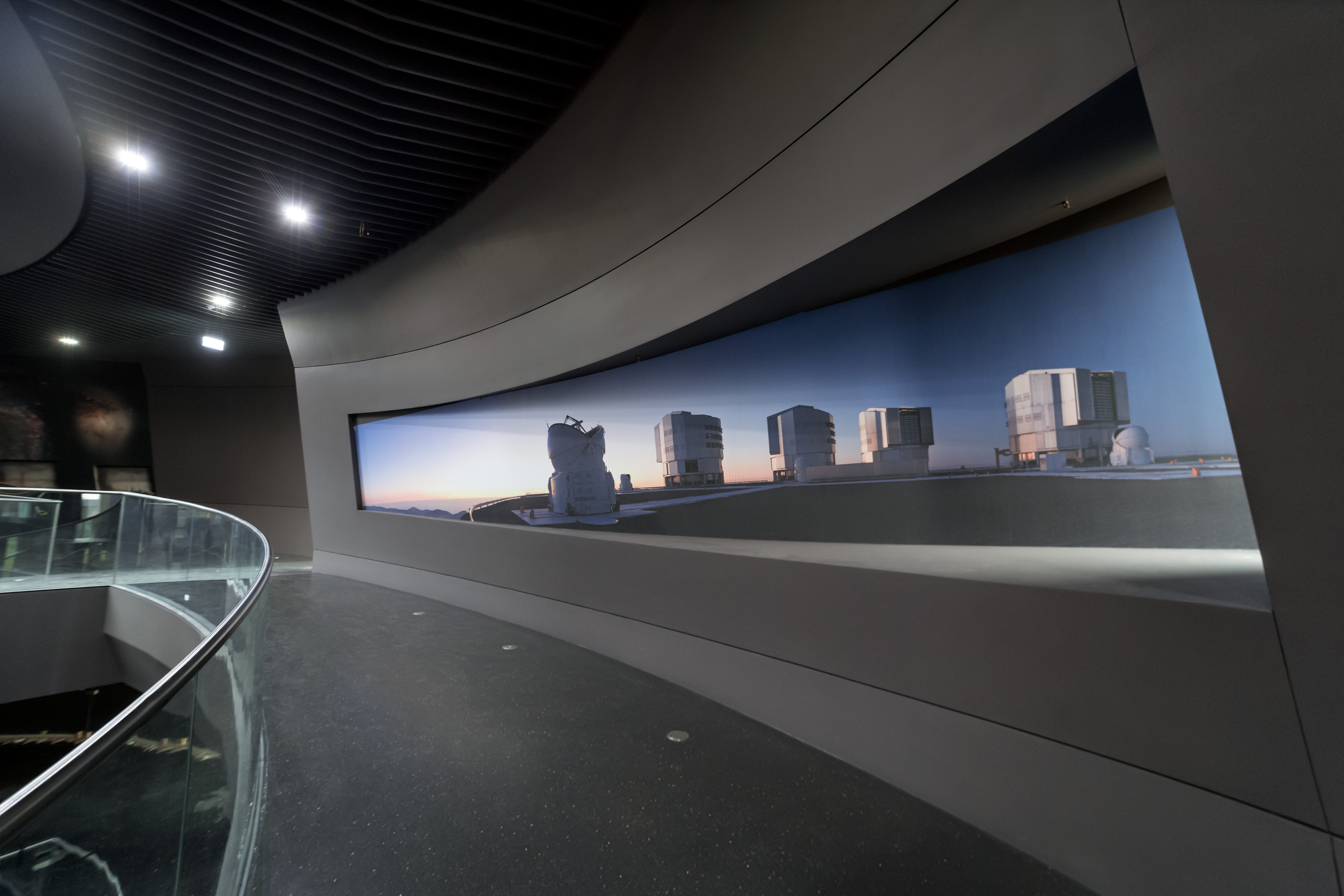
A new walkway in ESO's new Planetarium and Visitor Centre in Garching.

The ESO Supernova contains 2,200 m^{2} (24,000 sq ft) of exhibition space which is used for both permanent and temporary exhibitions. The permanent exhibition, designed by the company design und mehr, is called The Living Universe. The Supernova project group at the Heidelberg Institute for Theoretical Studies contributed the scientific expertise to the development of the content for the exhibition. Therefore, the researchers at HITS developed more than twenty interactive exhibits specifically for the ESO Supernova that will allow visitors to dive into a broad range of topics by means of interactive computer simulations, virtual reality, and state-of-the-art computer graphics.

The 13 themes of the exhibition present concepts of general astronomy, life in the Universe, and how celestial objects are studied using modern telescopes and technologies.

Using hands-on exhibits, digital interactives, videos and audio installations visitors can investigate all the scientific topics that make up modern astrophysics. At every single stations visitors can choose the depth at which they want to delve into the topic. All information is also explained at a special child-friendly level.

The exhibition also caters to teachers and educators by including educational concepts from school curricula, allowing teachers to use parts of the exhibition to support and enhance the way in which they cover the school curricula.

The exhibition also includes a small modern 3D cinema that shows 3D and 2D film in English and German.

== Guided Tours ==
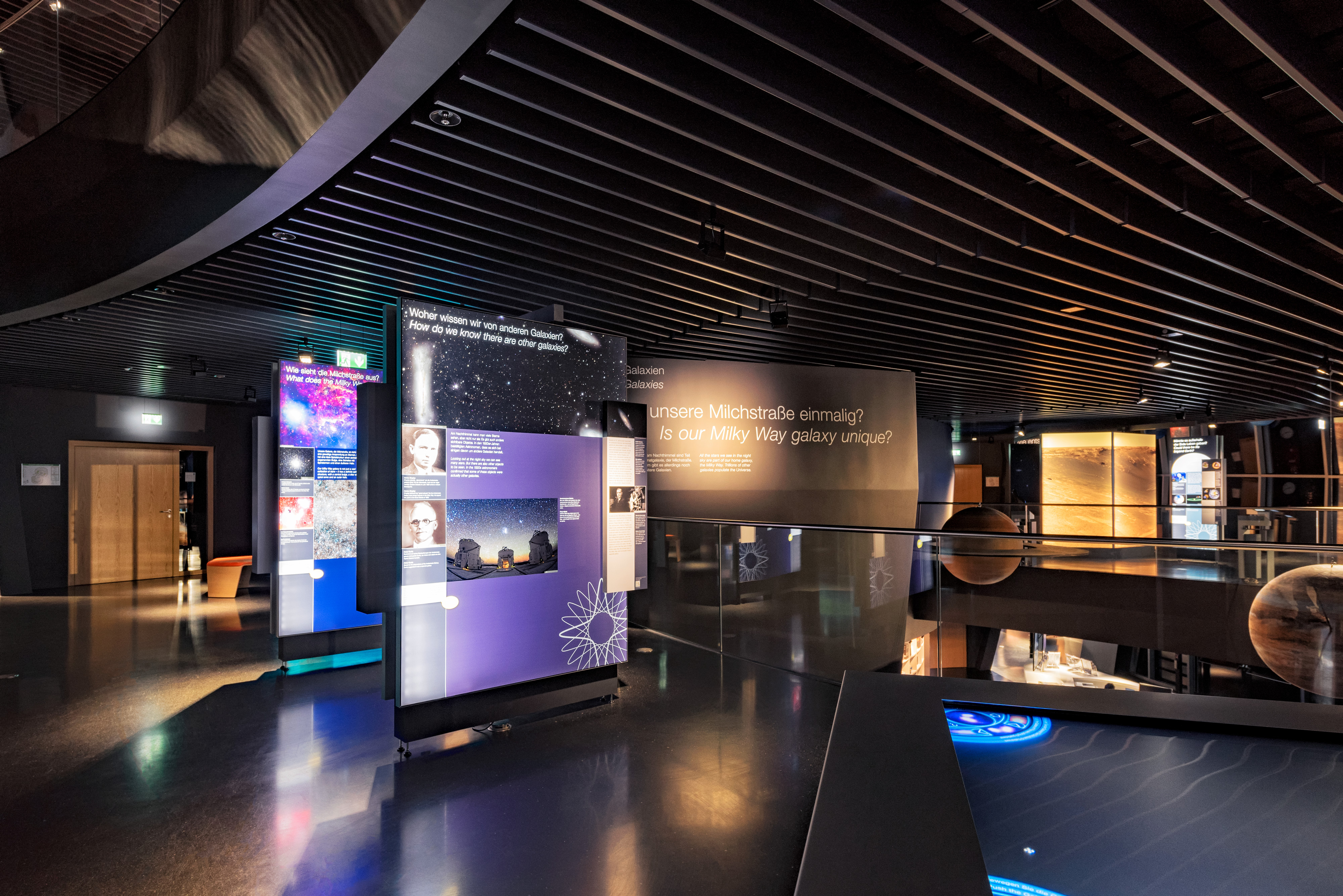
Exhibitions Include 104 app kiosks, 147 panels and 92 huge wall and floor prints.

The ESO Supernova organises several different guided tours each day in both German and English, covering diverse topics within astronomy, the history of ESO, and the architecture of ESO’s buildings. Three of the regular tours are listed below, but special bookable tours on a variety of themes are also available.

- ESO Supernova Exhibition Tour: A professional astronomer or engineer takes visitors to see the main highlights of the exhibition and answers questions about astronomy.
- Premises Tour: A tour of ESO Headquarters, usually closed to visitors, to find out about the history and future of ESO.
- ESO ArchitecTour: Visitors see and learn about the architecture of the ESO Supernova and ESO Headquarters.

== Educational programmes ==
The ESO Supernova provides learning experiences for students aged 4–18. Professional educators use astronomy to teach young people about science and technology through interactive workshops, planetarium shows and tours. Experiences are adapted to the age of the visiting school group.

Two specially developed educational planetarium shows with strong curriculum links have been developed: The Sky Above Us aimed at students aged 4–7, and A Tour of the Universe aimed at students aged 8–11.

Six different hands-on workshops are available, which are each tailored to different stages in the Bavarian school curriculum, from kindergarten to grade 13. Every workshop demonstrates how an astronomical context can be used to teach a wide range of curriculum subjects, linking them together in an interdisciplinary way.

For teachers, the ESO Supernova offers teacher training sessions and coordinates a network of teachers in Bavaria, Germany and Europe.

== See also ==
- European Southern Observatory, European Southern Observatory
- List of planetariums, List of Planetariums
