= Nanosystems Initiative Munich =

German research cluster

The Nanosystems Initiative Munich (NIM) is a German research cluster in the field of nano sciences. It is one of the excellence clusters being funded within the German Excellence Initiative of the Deutsche Forschungsgemeinschaft.

The cluster joins the scientific work of about 60 research groups in the Munich region and combines several disciplines: physics, biophysics, physical chemistry, biochemistry, pharmacology, biology, electrical engineering and medical science. Using the expertise in all these fields the cluster aims to create new nanosystems for information technology as well as for life sciences.

The participating institutions of the Nanosystems Initiative Munich are LMU Munich, the Technical University of Munich, the University of Augsburg, the Max Planck Institutes of Quantum Optics and Biochemistry, the Munich University of Applied Sciences, the Walther Meissner Institute and the "Center for New Technologies" at Deutsches Museum.
