= Matkahuolto =

Finnish transport and logistics company

Oy Matkahuolto Ab

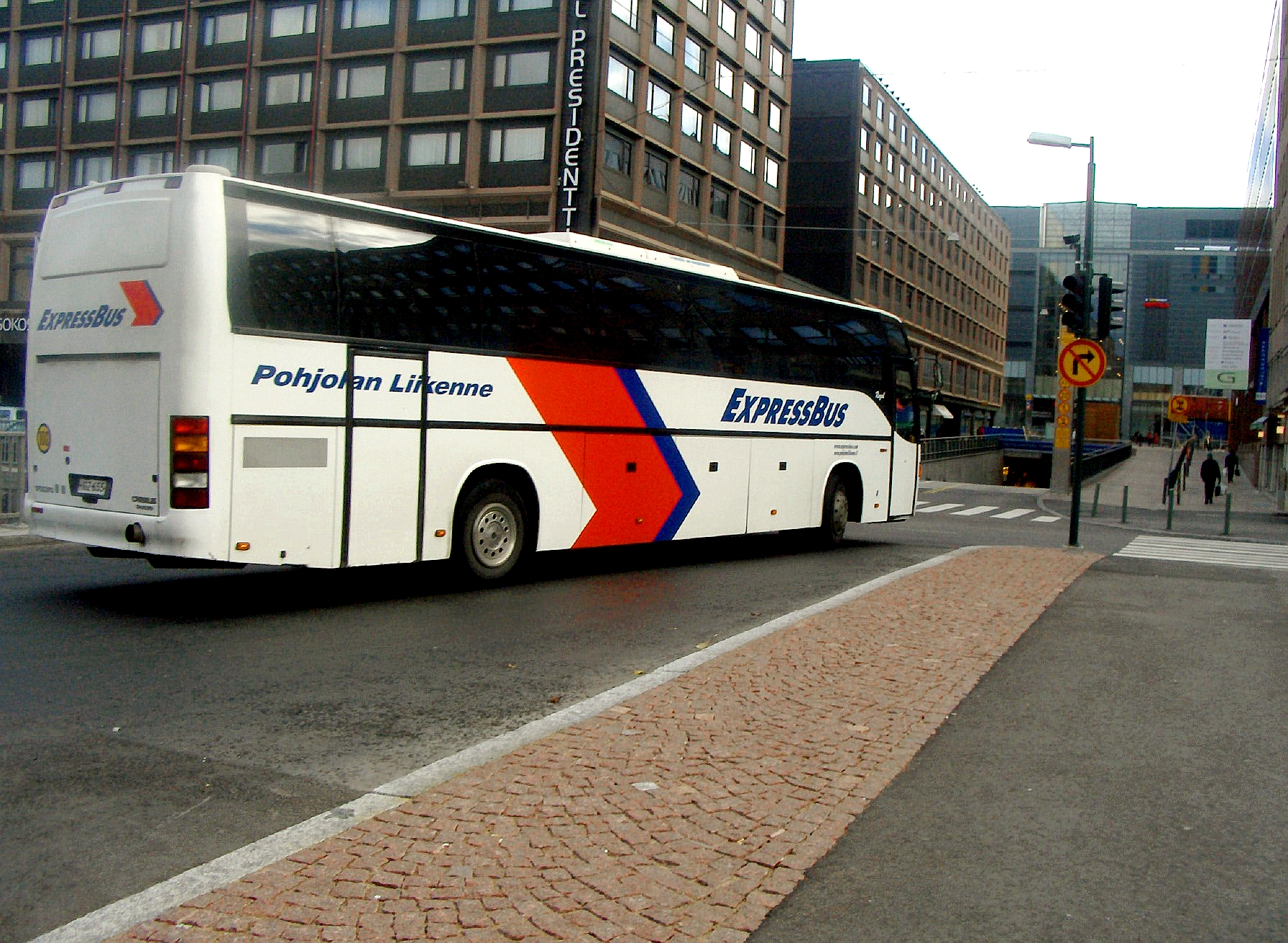
- Founded: 1933
- Headquarters: Lauttasaarentie 8 Helsinki, Finland.
- Service area: Finland
- Service type: Intercity coach service
- Hubs: Kamppi Center, Helsinki Airport, and others
- Fuel type: Diesel
- Chief executive: Jarmo Oksaharju
- Website: Matkahuolto.fi

Oy Matkahuolto Ab (Finnish pronunciation: [ˈmɑtkɑˌhuo̯lto]; is a Finnish company, which was established on 28 January 1933 to operate and maintain bus stations throughout Finland and to provide freight services. The spokesperson was Kaarlo Leander, the chair of Linja-autoliitto ry which was established to act as the interest group of private bus operators.

== History ==
Waiting rooms were proposed to be built in the biggest cities, and the first bus stations were built in 1929 in Tampere and in Hämeenlinna in the gas stations of Shell Oy and Nobel-Standard (Esso) Oy. Bus stations were quickly built by the local departments of Linja-autoliitto also in Helsinki, Viipuri, Porvoo, Loviisa, Lohja, Lappeenranta and Imatra. In the end of the century, there were 36 bus stations in Finland, and in 56 localities there was a Matkahuolto agent selling tickets and handling freight. The total number of personnel was approximately 250. The busiest and most profitable were the bus stations of Helsinki and other big cities. These stations had also cafeterias that were rented to outsiders.

The outbreak of the Winter War in the end of November 1939 made operations more difficult and many bus stations were damaged by bombing. Extra income was obtained by selling coal, and buses were powered by wood gas generators. The Continuation War against the Soviet Union took place in 1941-1944, and the Lapland War against Germany ended in 1945.

The wartime depression started to ease gradually although many products were under control until the 1950s. Freight traffic started to increase and in the end of the 1940s, when 40 percent of turnover came from freight traffic. There were 49 bus stations and 310 agents. The number of employees was 320, of which almost 80 percent were women. A new financing method for bus stations was developed in 1954. Together with cities and other partners, property companies started to be established and thus, risks were diminished. In the end of the 1960s, the company started to claim to its possession kiosks and cafeterias but in the longer term, this was not an economically viable venture.

The first chair of the company's board of directors was Chancellor Professor Arvo Sipilä, keeping this position for more than 40 years. Traffic Counsellors Yrjö Penttilä and U. M. Heinonen were in administrative positions for almost 40 years. In the middle of the 1970s, the personnel magazine äMHoo was established for information purposes.

After Graduate Engineer Atte Rainio, Graduate Engineer Yrjö Wänttinen served as the managing director of Oy Matkahuolto Ab in 1936-66. After Olli Metsävainio, Master of Economics, Jan Heikkilä, Master of Economics and later Commercial Counsellor, was elected as the managing director in 1981. In 1984, Oy Matkahuolto Ab moved to a new place of business in Lauttasaari in Helsinki. The tightened competition and the strong depression in 1990s complicated the operational preconditions of Oy Matkahuolto Ab. As a marketing and service company of bus traffic, the company has not been able to operate clearly according to the principles of a business enterprise. In the name of the collective benefit of the field, it has been obliged to maintain unprofitable operations, like information on timetables and sale of tickets, as well as services in sparsely populated areas.

By the beginning of the 1990s, the company had clearly developed into a marketing and service company of bus traffic combining approximately 400 Finnish bus operating companies into a functional entity.

The long-term managing director Jan Heikkilä retired in April 1996 and Graduate Engineer Pekka Hongisto was elected as the new managing director in 1997. The biggest challenge of Oy Matkahuolto Ab in the 2000s was building the new bus terminal Kamppi Center in Helsinki. The company's core business consists of travel and parcel services and cafeteria and kiosk operations. The company employs 700 people. Oy Matkahuolto Ab's subsidiaries include TRIM-softa Oy, an ICT company, and 11 property companies.

== Services ==
Oy Matkahuolto Ab promotes public transport and develops and provides travel-related products and services. One of its main areas of expertise is to develop the nationwide ticketing, information and fare collection systems. The timetable service available on the Internet and by phone contains the timetables of all buses operating in Finland, providing information about 40 000 departures and 20 000 bus stops throughout the country.

Oy Matkahuolto Ab maintains and develops a national parcel transportation service based on nationwide scheduled route network, supplementing it with a pickup and delivery system and, as required, with other means of transportation. Parcels can be sent via Oy Matkahuolto Ab to locations throughout Finland, and all over the world in collaboration with TNT.

Oy Matkahuolto Ab's services are available through 2 000 service outlets, 60 of which are owned by the company. In addition, its services are marketed and sold through agents at more than 400 localities. Parcel services for online shopping and mail order companies are available from Tradeka outlets which include Siwa, EuroMarket and Valintatalo grocery stores. Ticket refunding services are offered by the R-kioski chain.
