= Assemblin Caverion Group =

European technical services company

- Company type: Privately held company
- Industry: Technical solutions for buildings and industries
- Predecessor: Assemblin AB (Aktiebolag), - Caverion Corporation
- Founded: 2024
- Headquarters: Stockholm (Hägersten)
- Area served: Northern Europe, Central Europe
- Key people: Mats Johansson (CEO), Jacob Götzsche (Executive Chairman)
- Products: MEP (Mechanical, Electrical & Plumbing) - Building technology – Industrial solutions
- Revenue: € 3.8 billion (2023)
- Owner: Triton Partners
- Number of employees: approximately 21,500 (2024)
- Website: www.assemblincaverion.com

The Assemblin Caverion Group is a technical service and installation company, operating in Northern and Central Europe. It is headquartered in Stockholm, Sweden. The Group’s combined revenue is €3.8 billion (2023) and it employs approximately 21,500 people (2024). Its main activities are in building services (MEP - Mechanical, electrical, and plumbing / HVAC) and building automation, which comprise base systems, smart technologies and digital solutions. The group focuses on the life-cycle of buildings, infrastructure and industrial compounds. Its services consist of technical installation, maintenance, plant management and engineering.

== Corporate history ==
The current group is the result of the merger of Assemblin and Caverion (1 April 2024).

=== Assemblin ===
Assemblin is a complete installation and service partner with operations in Sweden, Norway and Finland. The company designs, installs and maintains technical systems for buildings. Assemblin has a turnover of approximately SEK 14.6 billion and 7.100 dedicated employees in around 100 locations (2023).

=== Caverion ===
Caverion is a building technology and industrial solutions company operating in 9 countries in Northern and Central Europe, with around 15 000 employees and turnover of 2.5 billion euros (2023). The company was founded in 2013 through the demerger from YIT. Caverion Corporation was delisted from Nasdaq Helsinki as of 1 July 2024.

== Local roots and notable acquisitions ==
=== Sweden ===
Assemblin’s history goes back to the early 1900s in Sweden. Allmänna Ingenjörsbyrån was founded in 1901. The companies Sana and Nordiska Värme och Ventilations were founded in 1902 and 1903. Thereafter, the Swedish company Assemblin grew through several mergers between Sydtotal, Närkes Elektriska (NEA) and Imtech.

=== Finland ===
Caverion Corporation was established in June 2013 through the demerger of the Building Services and Industrial Services businesses from YIT Group. Caverion acquired companies like EMC Talotekniikka Oy, Maintpartner, Huurre and Pelsu Pelastussuunnitelma. Assemblin Caverion's national office for Finland is located in Vapaala, Vantaa.

The Baltic countries, Estonia, Latvia and Lithuania, are part of the Finnish organisation.

=== Norway ===
Caverion's Norwegian history goes back to Frognerkilens Fabrikk, established in Oslo- Skøyen in 1873. Since then, a series of company acquisitions were carried out: Norsk Elektrisk Aktiebolag, Drammens Rørleggerforretning, Elektrisk Bureau AS, Per Kure A/S, Norsk Viftefabrikk AS, Elektro Union, Eneas and Esco were fused in. Together these have led to today's Caverion Norge, which is located in Oslo-Etterstad.

=== Denmark and Continental Europe ===
In Danmark, Caverion acquired Gunderlund A/S in December 2019 and CS Electric A/S in September 2022, thus extending its activity in the marine, energy and industrial segments. Nowadays Caverion Danmark has its national main office in Fredericia, Jutland. German and Austrian organisations have been growing through acquisitions of GTS Immobilien GmbH (Austria), Bott Kälte- und Klimatechnik (Germany) and PORREAL Group (Austria) and Felcon GmbH (Austria).
