= FRM II =

German nuclear research reactor

Coordinates: 48.266°N 11.676°E

The Research Neutron Source Heinz Maier-Leibnitz (Forschungsreaktor München II or FRM II) (German: Forschungs-Neutronenquelle Heinz Maier-Leibnitz) is a leading German research reactor and neutron source, named in honor of the physicist Heinz Maier-Leibnitz who had conducted a highly successful research program at its predecessor, the FRM I. Operated by the Technical University of Munich, it is located on its campus in Garching.

== Overview ==
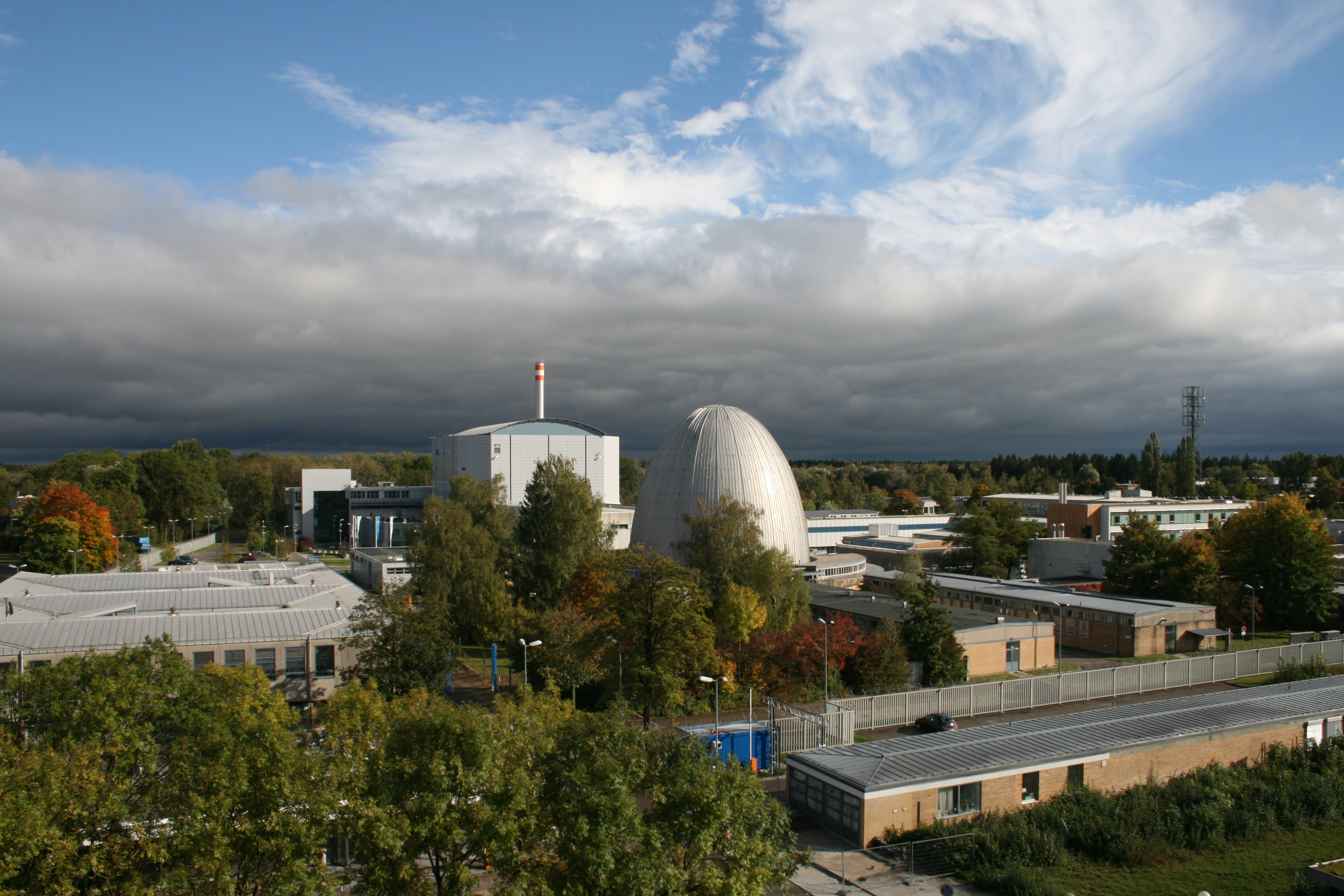
Research reactor Munich I (foreground) and II (background)

The FRM II is located in the immediate neighbourhood of FRM I, on the research and university campus near Garching (18 km north of Munich). It is operated by the Technical University of Munich. Several other universities and research institutions are taking part in the scientific use.

The reactor was built by Siemens. It went critical on March 2, 2004, and reached the full power of 20 MW on August, 24. Since April 2005, it is in routine operation. The regular schedule comprises 4 reactor cycles per year, with 60 days per cycle.

Highly enriched uranium in a high-density uranium silicide-aluminium dispersion fuel element yields an excellent ratio of neutron flux to thermal power. A liquid deuterium moderator ("cold source") gives a world-leading cold-neutron flux density.

== Usage ==
The FRM II is optimized for neutron scattering experiments at beam tubes and neutron guides. Furthermore, there are irradiation facilities, for example to produce medically used radioisotopes (as Lu-177), and a tumour treatment facility. The more than 25 scientific instruments are operated by different chairs of the Technical University of Munich, other universities, Helmholtz Centres and Max-Planck Institutes. The Jülich Centre for Neutron Science (JCNS) of the Forschungszentrum Jülich operates its own outstation at the FRM II. Each instrument offers 2/3 of its beam time for scientists from all over the world. 30 percent is foreseen for industrial use.
