= TUM School of Computation, Information and Technology =

- Established: 2022
- Dean: Hans-Joachim Bungartz
- Website: cit.tum.de

The TUM School of Computation, Information and Technology (CIT) is a school of the Technical University of Munich, established in 2022 by the merger of three former departments. As of 2022, it is structured into the Department of Mathematics, the Department of Computer Engineering, the Department of Computer Science, and the Department of Electrical Engineering.

== Department of Mathematics ==
The Department of Mathematics (MATH) is located at the Garching campus.

=== History ===
Mathematics was taught from the beginning at the Polytechnische Schule in München and the later Technische Hochschule München. Otto Hesse was the department's first professor for calculus, analytical geometry and analytical mechanics. Over the years, several institutes for mathematics were formed.

In 1974, the Institute of Geometry was merged with the Institute of Mathematics to form the Department of Mathematics, and informatics, which had been part of the Institute of Mathematics, became a separate department.

=== Research Groups ===
As of 2022, the research groups at the department are:

- Algebra
- Analysis
- Analysis and Modelling
- Applied Numerical Analysis, Optimization and Data Analysis
- Biostatistics
- Discrete Optimization
- Dynamic Systems
- Geometry and Topology
- Mathematical Finance
- Mathematical Optimization
- Mathematical Physics
- Mathematical Modeling of Biological Systems
- Numerical Mathematics
- Numerical Methods for Plasma Physics
- Optimal Control
- Probability Theory
- Scientific Computing
- Statistics

== Department of Computer Science ==
The Department of Computer Science (CS) is located at the Garching campus.

=== History ===
The first courses in computer science at the Technical University of Munich were offered in 1967 at the Department of Mathematics, when Friedrich L. Bauer introduced a two-semester lecture titled Information Processing. In 1968, Klaus Samelson started offering a second lecture cycle titled Introduction to Informatics. By 1992, the computer science department had separated from the Department of Mathematics to form an independent Department of Informatics.

In 2002, the department relocated from its old campus in the Munich city center to the new building on the Garching campus.

In 2017, the Department celebrated 50 Years of Informatics Munich with a series of lectures and ceremonies, together with LMU Munich and the University of the Bundeswehr Munich.

=== Chairs ===
As of 2022, the department consists of the following chairs:

- AI in Healthcare and Medicine
- Algorithmic Game Theory
- Algorithms and Complexity
- Application and Middleware Systems
- Augmented Reality
- Bioinformatics
- Computational Imaging and AI in Medicine
- Computational Molecular Medicine
- Computer Aided Medical Procedures
- Computer Graphics and Visualization
- Computer Vision and AI
- Cyber Trust
- Data Analytics and Machine Learning
- Data Science and Engineering
- Database Systems
- Decision Science & Systems
- Dynamic Vision and Learning
- Efficient Algorithms
- Engineering Software for Decentralized Systems
- Ethics in Systems Design and Machine Learning
- Formal Languages, Compiler & Software Construction
- Formal Methods for Software Reliability
- Hardware-aware Algorithms and Software for HPC
- Information Systems & Business Process Management
- Law and Security of Digitization
- Legal Tech
- Logic and Verification
- Machine Learning of 3D Scene Geometry
- Physics-based Simulation
- Quantum Computing
- Scientific Computing
- Software & Systems Engineering
- Software Engineering
- Software Engineering for Business Information Systems
- Theoretical Computer Science
- Theoretical Foundations of AI
- Visual Computing

=== Notable people ===
Seven faculty members of the Department of Informatics have been awarded the Gottfried Wilhelm Leibniz Prize, one of the highest endowed research prizes in Germany with a maximum of €2.5 million per award:

- 2020 – Thomas Neumann
- 2016 – Daniel Cremers
- 2008 – Susanne Albers
- 1997 – Ernst Mayr
- 1995 – Gerd Hirzinger
- 1994 – Manfred Broy
- 1991 – Karl-Heinz Hoffmann

Friedrich L. Bauer was awarded the 1988 IEEE Computer Society Computer Pioneer Award for inventing the stack data structure. Gerd Hirzinger was awarded the 2005 IEEE Robotics and Automation Society Pioneer Award. Hans-Arno Jacobsen and Burkhard Rost were awarded the Alexander von Humboldt Professorship in 2011 and 2008, respectively. Rudolf Bayer was known for inventing the B-tree and Red–black tree.

== Department of Electrical Engineering ==
The Department of Electrical Engineering (EE) is partly located at the Munich campus but expected to move entirely to Garching.

=== History ===
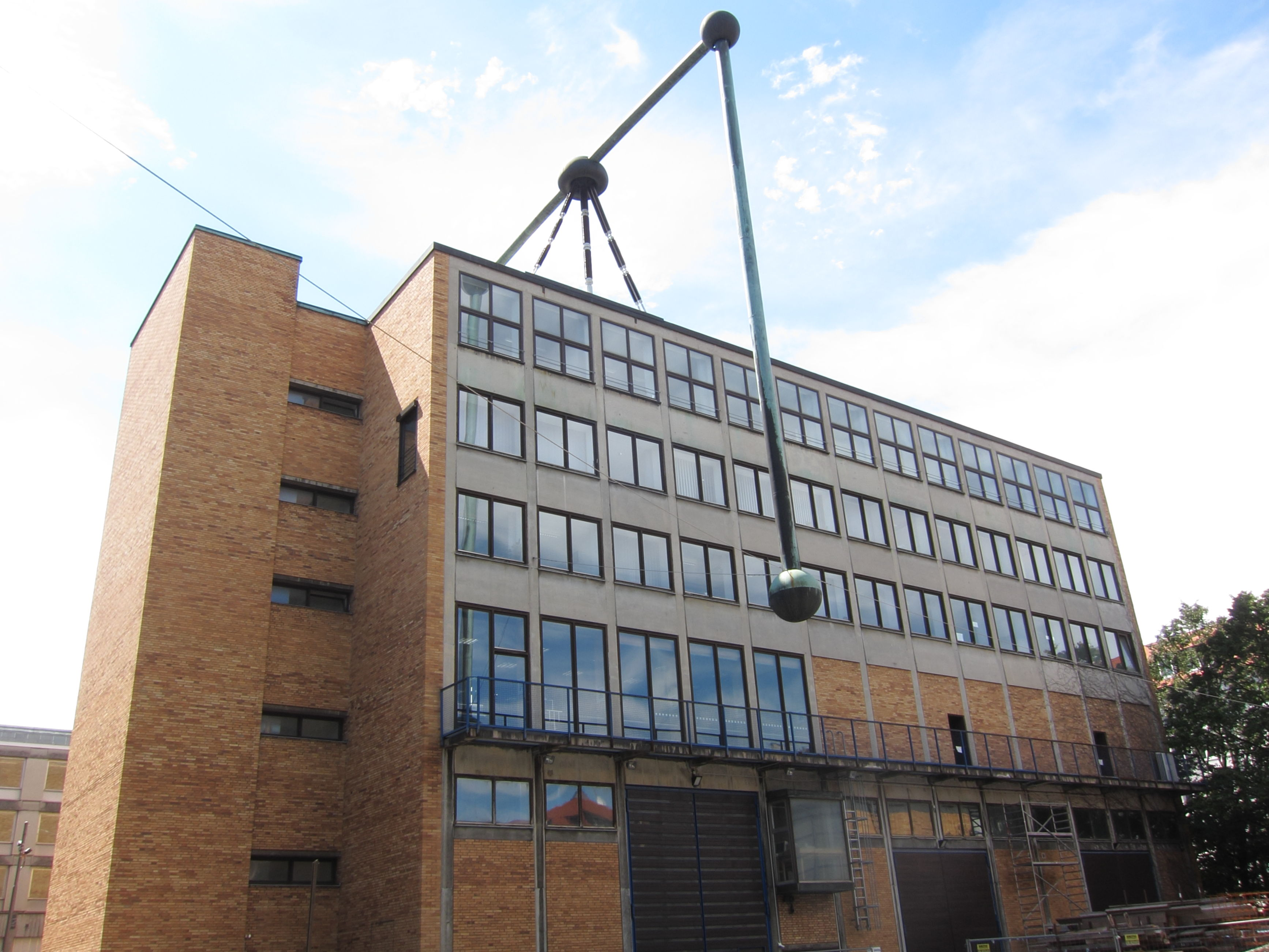
Electrical Engineering in the city center

The first lectures in the field of electricity at the Polytechnische Schule München were given as early as 1876 by the physicist Wilhelm von Bezold. Over the years, as the field of electrical engineering became increasingly important, a separate department for electrical engineering emerged within the mechanical engineering department. In 1967, the department was renamed the Faculty of Mechanical and Electrical Engineering, and six electrical engineering departments were permanently established.

In April 1974, the formal establishment of the new TUM Department of Electrical and Computer Engineering took place. While still located in the Munich campus, a new building is currently in construction on the Garching campus and the department is expected to move by 2025.

=== Professorships ===
As of 2022, the department consists of the following chairs and professorships:

- Biomedical Electronics
- Circuit Design
- Computational Photonics
- Control and Manipulation of Microscale Living Objects
- Environmental Sensing and Modeling
- High Frequency Engineering
- Hybrid Electronic Systems
- Measurement Systems and Sensor Technology
- Micro- and Nanosystems Technology
- Microwave Engineering
- Molecular Electronics
- Nano and Microrobotics
- Nano and Quantum Sensors
- Neuroelectronics
- Physics of Electrotechnology
- Quantum Electronics and Computer Engineering
- Semiconductor Technology
- Simulation of Nanosystems for Energy Conversion

== Department of Computer Engineering ==
The Department of Computer Engineering was separated from the former Department of Electrical and Computer Engineering as the result of merger into the School of Computation, Information and Technology.

=== Professorships ===
As of 2022, the department consists of the following chairs and professorships:

- Architecture of Parallel and Distributed Systems
- Audio Information Processing
- Automatic Control Engineering
- Bio-inspired Information Processing
- Coding and Cryptography
- Communications Engineering
- Communication Networks
- Computer Architecture & Operating Systems
- Computer Architecture and Parallel Systems
- Connected Mobility
- Cognitive Systems
- Cyber Physical Systems
- Data Processing
- Electronic Design Automation
- Embedded Systems and Internet of Things
- Healthcare and Rehabilitation Robotics
- Human-Machine Communication
- Information-oriented Control
- Integrated Systems
- Line Transmission Technology
- Machine Learning for Robotics
- Machine Learning in Engineering
- Machine Vision and Perception
- Media Technology
- Network Architectures and Services
- Neuroengineering Materials
- Real-Time Computer Systems
- Robotics Science and System Intelligence
- Robotics, AI and realtime systems
- Security in Information Technology
- Sensor-based Robot Systems and Intelligent Assistance Systems
- Signal Processing Methods
- Theoretical Information Technology

== Building ==
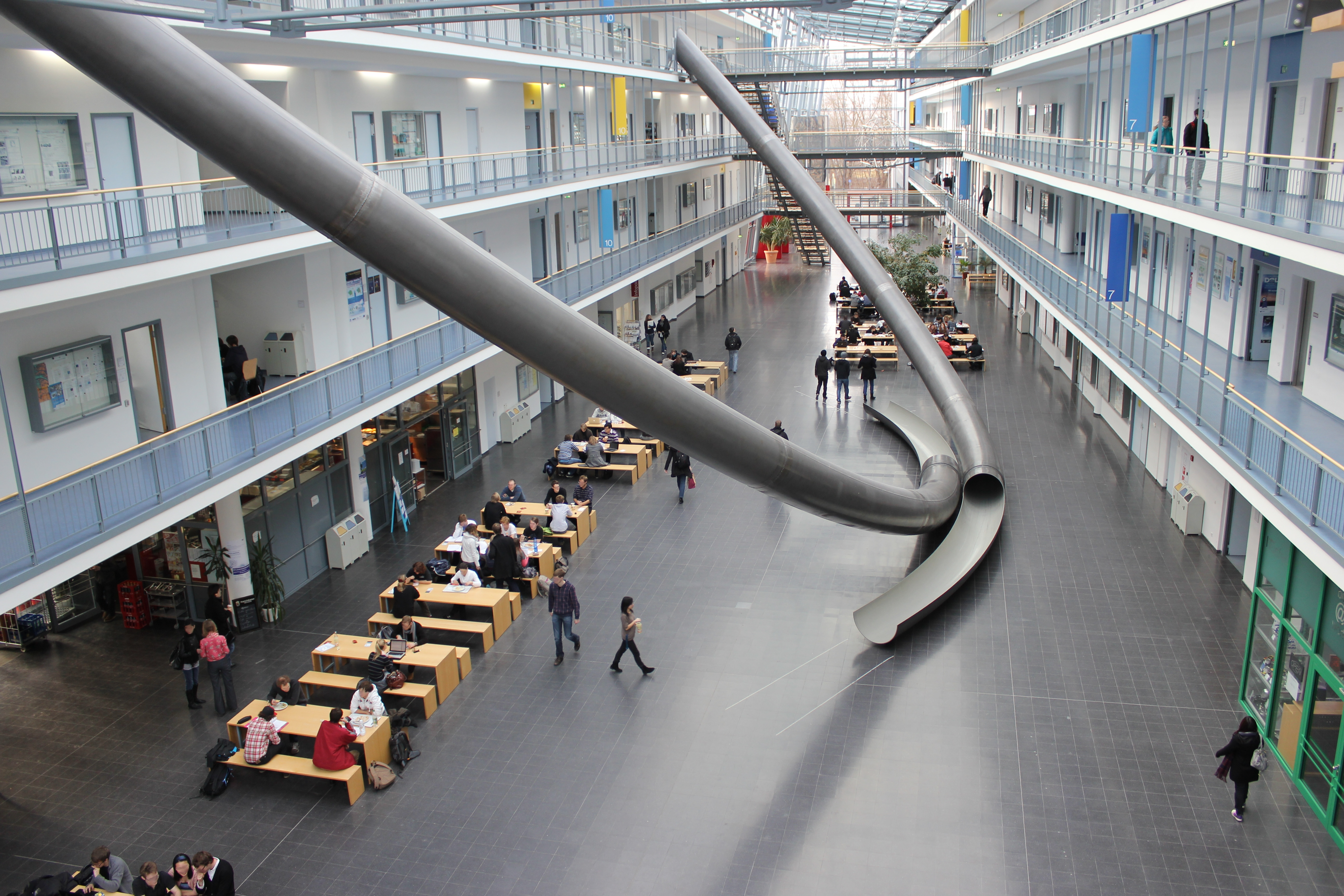
Interior of the faculty building for the Departments of Mathematics and Computer Science

The Department of Computer Science shares a building with the Department of Mathematics.

In the building, two massive parabolic slides run from the fourth floor to the ground floor. Their shape corresponds to the equation $z=y=hx^2/d^2$ and is supposed to represent the "connection of science and art".

== Rankings ==
University rankings

By subject – Global & National
QS Computer Science & Information Systems 2023	=29	1
THE Computer Science 2023	10	1
ARWU Computer Science & Engineering 2022	51-75	1
QS Mathematics 2023	=43	2
ARWU Mathematics 2022	51-75	3-4
QS Statistics & Operational Research 2023	28	1
QS Electrical & Electronic Engineering 2023	=18	1
THE Engineering 2023	20	1
ARWU Electrical & Electronic Engineering 2022	22	1

CHE Ranking 2020 – National
Mathematics (B. / M.)
Overall study situation	● 1.6	● 1.6
Support in studies	● 1.8	● 2.0
Support in the study entry phase	● 11/14 pts.
Teacher support	● 2.0	● 2.0
Graduations in appropriate time	● 77.6%	● 70.9%
International orientation	● 5/9 pts.	● 8/9 pts.
Third party funds per academic	● 45.9
Computer Science (B. / M.)
Overall study situation	● 1.8	● 1.6
Research orientation	● 2.1	● 1.7
Support in studies	● 1.9	● 1.9
Support in the study entry phase	● 10/14 pts.
Graduations in appropriate time	● 69.3%	● 42.8%
International orientation	● 5/9 pts.	● 8/9 pts.

The Department of Computer Science has been consistently rated the top computer science department in Germany by major rankings. Globally, it ranks No. 29 (QS), No. 10 (THE), and within No. 51-75 (ARWU). In the 2020 national CHE University Ranking, the department is among the top rated departments for computer science and business informatics, being rated in the top group for the majority of criteria.

The Department of Mathematics has been rated as one of the top mathematics departments in Germany, ranking 43rd in the world and 2nd in Germany (after the University of Bonn) in the QS World University Rankings, and within No. 51-75 in the Academic Ranking of World Universities. In Statistics & Operational Research, QS ranks TUM first in Germany and 28th in the world.

The Departments of Electrical and Computer Engineering are leading in Germany. In Electrical & Electronic Engineering, TUM is rated 18th worldwide by QS and 22nd by ARWU. In engineering as a whole, TUM is ranked 20th globally and 1st nationally in the Times Higher Education World University Rankings.

== See also ==
- Summer School Marktoberdorf
