= Ernst Mayr (computer scientist) =

German computer scientist and mathematician

Ernst W. Mayr
- Born: 18 May 1950 (age 76); Fürstenfeldbruck, Germany
- Education: Massachusetts Institute of Technology; Technical University of Munich
- Scientific career
- Fields: Computer science, Mathematics
- Workplaces: Stanford University; Technical University of Munich; Goethe University Frankfurt

Ernst Wilhelm Mayr (born 18 May 1950) is a German computer scientist and mathematician. He received the Gottfried Wilhelm Leibniz Prize in 1997 awarded for his contributions to theoretical computer science.

Mayr's research in computer science covers algorithms and complexity theory. He also explores symbolic mathematics/computer algebra and methods in bioinformatics. His principal interests lie in describing and modeling parallel and distributed programs and systems, the design and analysis of efficient parallel algorithms and programming paradigms, the design of algorithm solutions for scheduling and load balancing problems and investigation of their complexity theory. He also explores polynomial ideals and their complexity and algorithms as well as algorithms for searching and analyzing extensive bioinformatic data.

After studying mathematics at Technical University of Munich with a scholarship from the Maximilianeum foundation and computer science at Massachusetts Institute of Technology in Cambridge, Mayr did his doctorate at Technical University of Munich in 1980. In 1982, he became assistant professor of computer science at Stanford University, where he also participated in the Presidential Young Investigator Program. In 1988, he was appointed to the Chair of Theoretical Computer Science at Goethe University Frankfurt. Mayr has held the Chair of Efficient Algorithms at Technical University of Munich since 1993 where he also served as the dean of his faculty from 2000 to 2003. In 1997 he co-founded the annual international conference Computer Algebra in Scientific Computing with Vladimir P. Gerdt and served as a general chair from 1998 to 2013.
