= Daniel Cremers =

German computer scientist (born 1971)

- Born: 1971 (age 54–55); Freiburg im Breisgau, Germany
- Education: University of Heidelberg, University of Mannheim
- Awards: Gottfried Wilhelm Leibniz Prize
- Scientific career
- Fields: Computer vision, mathematical image analysis, partial differential equations, convex and combinatorial optimization, machine learning and statistical inference
- Workplaces: Technical University of Munich
- Thesis: Statistical shape knowledge in variational image segmentation (2002)
- Doctoral advisor: Christoph Schnörr

Daniel Cremers (born 1971) is a German computer scientist, Professor of Informatics and Mathematics and Chair of Computer Vision & Artificial Intelligence at the Technical University of Munich. His research foci are computer vision, mathematical image, partial differential equations, convex and combinatorial optimization, machine learning and statistical inference.

== Career ==
Cremers received a bachelor's degree in mathematics (1994) and Physics (1994), and later a master's degree in Theoretical Physics (1997) from the University of Heidelberg. He obtained a PhD in computer science from the University of Mannheim in 2002. He was a postdoctoral researcher at UCLA. He was associate professor at the University of Bonn from 2005 until 2009.

He received a Starting Grant (2009), a Consolidator Grant (2015) and an Advanced Grant (2020) by the European Research Council. On March 1, 2016, Cremers received the Gottfried Wilhelm Leibniz Prize for having "brought the field of image processing and pattern recognition an important step closer to its goal of reproducing the abilities of human vision with camera systems and computers."

== Selected publications ==
- Dosovitskiy, Alexey; Fischer, Philipp; Ilg, Eddy; Hausser, Philip; Hazirbas, Caner; Golkov, Vladimir; Smagt, Patrick van der; Cremers, Daniel; Brox, Thomas (2015). "FlowNet: Learning Optical Flow with Convolutional Networks". 2015 IEEE International Conference on Computer Vision (ICCV). IEEE. pp. 2758–2766. arXiv:1504.06852. doi:10.1109/iccv.2015.316. ISBN 978-1-4673-8391-2.
- Engel, Jakob; Schöps, Thomas; Cremers, Daniel (2014). "LSD-SLAM: Large-Scale Direct Monocular SLAM". Computer Vision – ECCV 2014. Lecture Notes in Computer Science. Vol. 8690. Cham: Springer International Publishing. pp. 834–849. doi:10.1007/978-3-319-10605-2_54. ISBN 978-3-319-10604-5. ISSN 0302-9743. S2CID 14547347.
- Sturm, Jürgen; Engelhard, Nikolas; Endres, Felix; Burgard, Wolfram; Cremers, Daniel (2012). "A benchmark for the evaluation of RGB-D SLAM systems". 2012 IEEE/RSJ International Conference on Intelligent Robots and Systems. IEEE. pp. 573–580. doi:10.1109/iros.2012.6385773. ISBN 978-1-4673-1736-8.
- Cremers, Daniel; Rousson, Mikael; Deriche, Rachid (6 August 2006). "A Review of Statistical Approaches to Level Set Segmentation: Integrating Color, Texture, Motion and Shape". International Journal of Computer Vision. 72 (2). Springer Science and Business Media LLC: 195–215. doi:10.1007/s11263-006-8711-1. ISSN 0920-5691. S2CID 2616070.
