= Hans-Joachim Bungartz =

German computer scientist

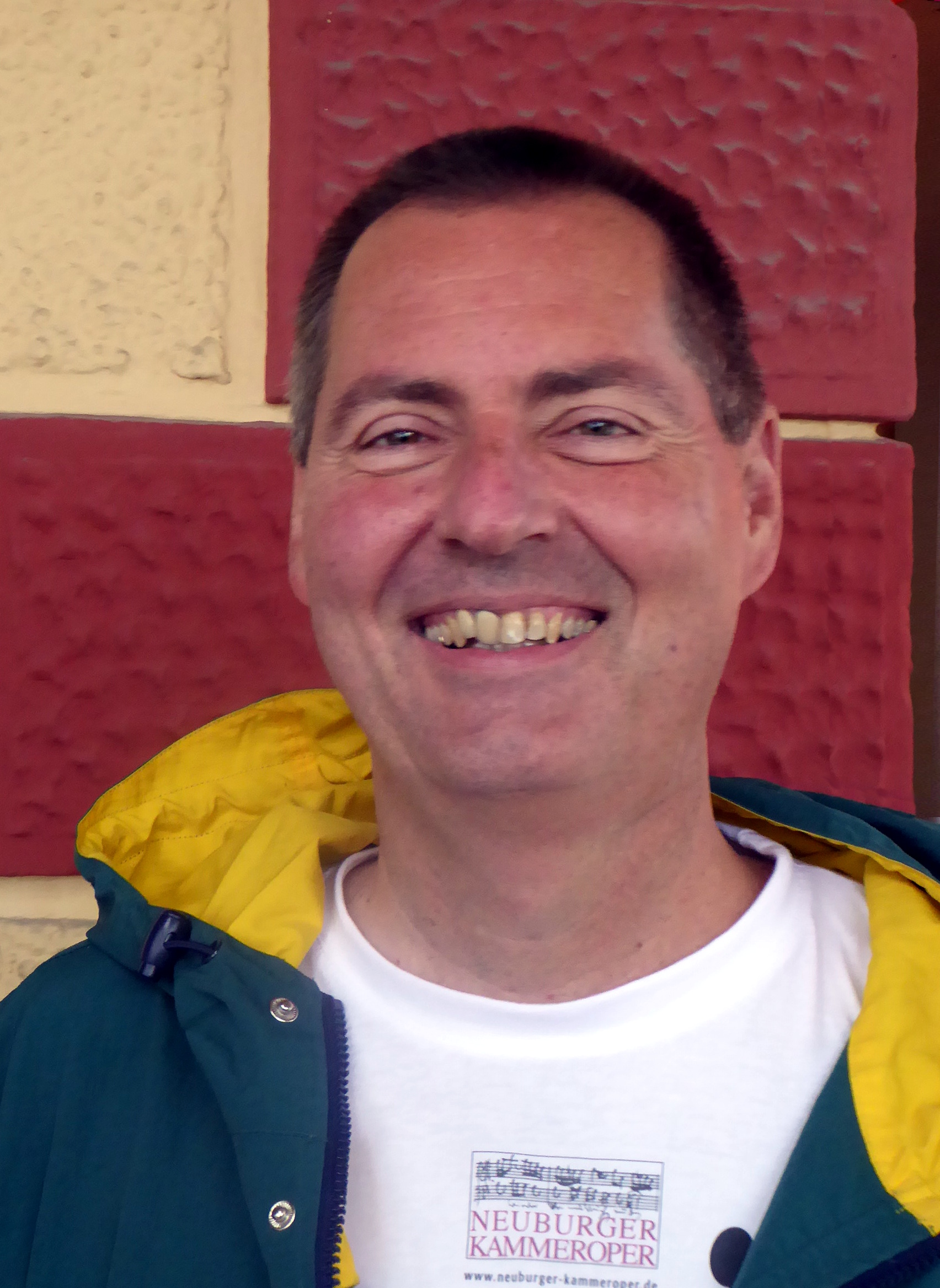
- Scientific career
- Workplaces: Technical University of Munich, University of Augsburg, University of Stuttgart
- Thesis: (1992)
- Doctoral advisor: Christoph Zenger

Hans-Joachim Bungartz (born 1963 in Lahr/Schwarzwald) is a German mathematician and computer scientist. He is a professor at the Technical University of Munich and holds the chair for scientific computing there. He was Dean of the Faculty of Computer Science and has been Dean of the TUM School of Computation, Information and Technology since October 2022.

Since 2011, he has been chairman of the board of the Deutsches Forschungsnetz.

== Career ==
Hans-Joachim Bungartz received his doctorate in 1992 under Christoph Zenger, after completing his studies in 1988/89 as both a mathematician and a computer scientist. In 1998, he habilitated on the topic of High-order finite elements on sparse grids. In 2000, he was appointed professor of numerical analysis and scientific computing at the University of Augsburg. In 2004, the University of Stuttgart appointed him to the Chair of Simulation of Large Systems. Since 2008, Hans-Joachim Bungartz has held the Chair of Scientific Computing at the Technical University of Munich. He is also a permanent visiting professor at the Faculty of Mechanical Engineering of the University of Belgrade.

== Personal life ==
Privately, Hans-Joachim Bungartz plays the violin and is a member of the Akademischer Orchesterverband München. Among other things, he contributed as a soloist to the 2009 Dies Academicus of the Technical University of Munich.
