= Gerd Hirzinger =

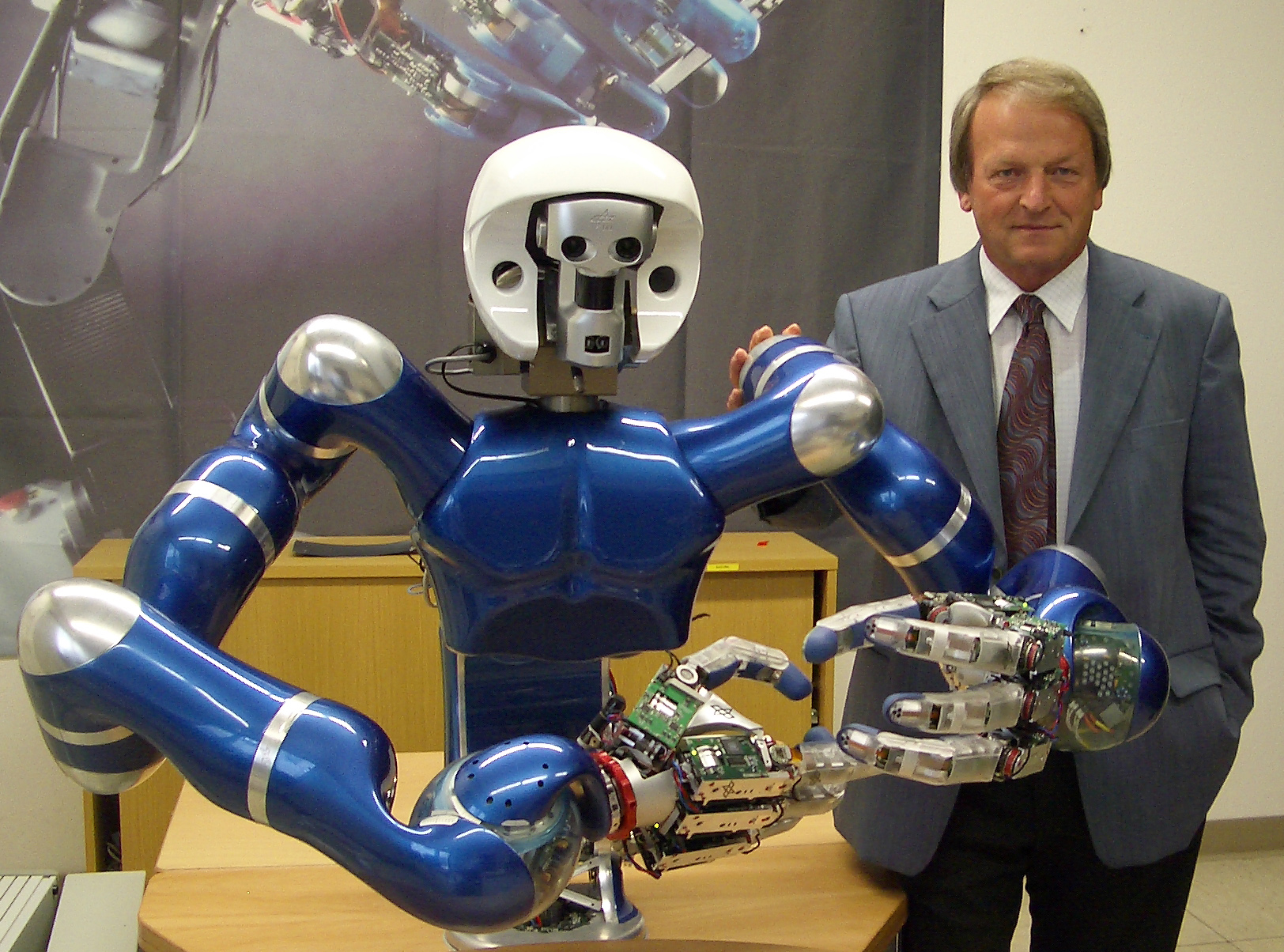
- Hirzinger in 2006
- Born: 1945 (age 80–81)
- Education: Technical University of Munich
- Known for: Space Robotics; Lightweight, Torque Controlled Robots; DLR Institute of Robotics and Mechatronics
- Scientific career
- Fields: Robotics
- Workplaces: DLR German Aerospace Center

Gerd Hirzinger received his Dipl.-Ing. degree and the doctor’s degree from the Technical University of Munich, in 1969 and 1974 respectively. In 1969 he joined DLR (the German Aerospace Center) where he first worked on fast digital control systems. 1976 he became head of the automation and robotics laboratory of DLR, where he and his co-workers soon got several awards for innovative technology transfer from robotics research to applications. In 1991 he received a joint professorship from the Technical University of Munich, and in 2003 an honorary professorship at the Harbin Institute of Technology in China.

He has been since 1992 director at the Institute of Robotics and Mechatronics at the DLR German Aerospace Center which is one of the largest and most acknowledged institutes in the field worldwide, including not only robot development for space and terrestrial applications, but also aircraft control and optimization, vehicle technology (X-by-wire components and systems) and medical technology (artificial hearts and surgical robots). He has published more than 600 papers in robotics, mainly on robot sensing, sensory feedback, mechatronics, man-machine interfaces, telerobotics and space robotics. He was prime investigator of the space robot technology experiment ROTEX, the first remotely controlled robot in space, which flew onboard shuttle COLUMBIA in April 93. For many years he has been chairman of the German council on robot control and administrative committee member of the IEEE Society on Robotics and Automation. He is now member of the IEEE fellow award committee.

== Awards and honors ==
He received numerous national and international awards, e.g. in 1994 the Joseph F. Engelberger Award for achievements in robotic science and in 1995 the Leibniz-Award, the highest scientific award in Germany and the JARA (Japan Robot Association) Award. In 1996 he received the Karl Heinz Beckurts Award, Germany’s most important award for outstanding promotion of the partnership between science and industry, and in 1997 the IEEE-Fellow Award. In 2004 he got the order of merit of the Federal Republic of Germany and became member of the “wall of fame” of the Heinz Nixdorf Computer Museum. In 2005 he received the IEEE Pioneer Award of the Robotics and Automation Society and the “honorary citizenship” of Budapest Tech, and in 2007 the IEEE Field Award “Robotics and Automation”. In 2008 he received the Nichols medal, one of the two highest awards of the International Federation of Automatic Control (IFAC) in the field of control. In 2014 he received the Bavarian Maximilian Order for Science and Art.
