= Thomas Brox =

Computer scientist and professor

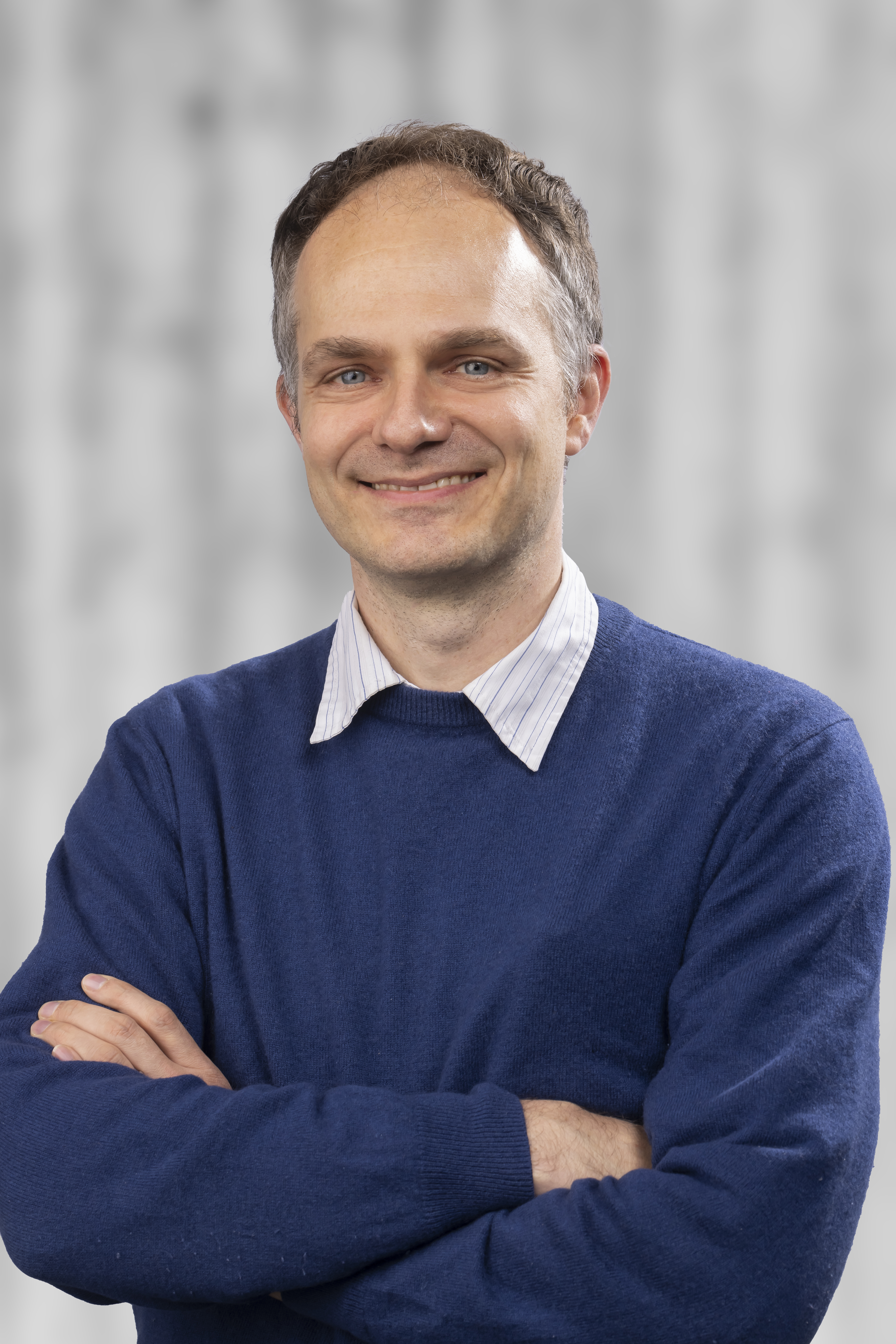
- Brox in 2020
- Born: 1976 (age 49–50)
- Education: Saarland University
- Awards: Longuet-Higgins Best Paper Award (2004); Koenderink Prize (2014)
- Scientific career
- Fields: Computer vision, machine learning
- Workplaces: University of Freiburg

Thomas Brox (born 1976) is a computer scientist and professor of pattern recognition and image processing at the University of Freiburg, where he heads the Computer Vision Group. His research is in computer vision and machine learning, including optical flow, visual representation learning and deep neural networks. He co-authored the U-Net architecture for biomedical image segmentation and FlowNet, a convolutional-neural-network approach to optical-flow estimation. According to Scopus, Brox's publications had received more than 130,000 citations by 2026.

Research on optical-flow estimation that Brox published with Andrés Bruhn, Nils Papenberg and Joachim Weickert received the Longuet-Higgins Best Paper Award at the European Conference on Computer Vision (ECCV) in 2004 and the Koenderink Prize in 2014. Brox has been a full member of the Heidelberg Academy of Sciences and Humanities since 2020.

== Academic career ==
Brox received his doctorate in computer science from Saarland University in 2005. He subsequently worked as a postdoctoral researcher at the University of Bonn, headed the Intelligent Systems Group at TU Dresden as a temporary professor, and was a postdoctoral researcher in Jitendra Malik's computer vision group at the University of California, Berkeley. In 2010, he joined the University of Freiburg, where he became professor of pattern recognition and image processing and head of the Computer Vision Group.

Brox was one of the programme chairs of ECCV 2020. On 1 July 2026, he became dean of the University of Freiburg's Faculty of Engineering.

== Research ==
An early focus of Brox's research was optical flow, the estimation of apparent motion between images. In 2004, Brox, Bruhn, Papenberg and Weickert proposed a variational optical-flow method combining brightness and gradient constancy with a discontinuity-preserving smoothness constraint and a nonlinear, multi-resolution optimization scheme. The work received the Longuet-Higgins Best Paper Award at ECCV 2004 and, ten years later, the Koenderink Prize.

In 2015, Brox co-authored two deep learning approaches in computer vision. With Olaf Ronneberger and Philipp Fischer, he presented U-Net, a convolutional architecture for biomedical image segmentation that combines a contracting path with an expanding path for spatial localization, including skip connections to carry forward, high-resolution information from the encoder.

In the same year, Brox was a co-author of FlowNet, which formulated optical-flow estimation as a supervised learning problem for convolutional neural networks and used entirely synthetically generated training data.

== Awards and memberships ==
- Longuet-Higgins Best Paper Award, ECCV, 2004, with Andrés Bruhn, Nils Papenberg and Joachim Weickert.
- Koenderink Prize, ECCV, 2014, for the 2004 optical-flow paper, with Bruhn, Papenberg and Weickert.
- Full member of the Heidelberg Academy of Sciences and Humanities since 2020.
