= List of presidents of the Technical University of Munich =

This is a list of directors, rectors and presidents of the Technical University of Munich.

== Directors (1868–1903) ==
1. Karl Maximilian von Bauernfeind (1868–1874)
2. Wilhelm von Beetz (1874–1877)
3. August von Kluckhohn (1877–1880)
4. Karl Maximilian von Bauernfeind (1880–1889)
5. Karl Haushofer (1889–1895)
6. Egbert von Hoyer (1895–1900)
7. Walther von Dyck (1900–1903)

== Rectors (1903–1976) ==
1. Walther von Dyck (1903–1906)
2. Friedrich von Thiersch (1906–1908)
3. Moritz Schröter (1908–1911)
4. Siegmund Günther (1911–1913)
5. Heinrich von Schmidt (1913–1915)
6. Karl Lintner (1915–1917)
7. Karl Heinrich Hager (1917–1919)
8. Walther von Dyck (1919–1925)
9. Jonathan Zenneck (1925–1927)
10. Kaspar Dantscher (1927–1929)
11. Johann Ossanna (1929–1931)
12. Richard Schachner (1931–1933)
13. Anton Schwaiger (1933–1935)
14. Albert Wolfgang Schmidt (1935–1938)
15. Lutz Pistor (1938–1945)
16. Hans Döllgast (1945)
17. Georg Faber (1945–1946)
18. Robert Vorhoelzer (1946–1947)
19. Ludwig Föppl (1947–1948)
20. Hans Piloty (1948–1951)
21. August Rucker (1951–1954)
22. Robert Sauer (1954–1956)
23. Ernst Schmidt (1956–1958)
24. Max Kneissl (1958–1960)
25. Gustav Aufhammer (1960–1962)
26. Franz Patat (1962–1964)
27. Heinrich Netz (1964–1965)
28. Gerd Albers (1965–1968)
29. Horst von Engerth (1968–1970)
30. Heinz Schmidtke (1970–1972)
31. Ulrich Grigull (1972–1976)

== Presidents (since 1976) ==
1. Ulrich Grigull (1976–1980)
2. Wolfgang Wild (1980–1986)
3. Herbert Kupfer (1986–1987)
4. Otto Meitinger (1987–1995)
5. Wolfgang A. Herrmann (1995–2019)
6. Thomas Hofmann (since 2019)
