= Bauernfeind prism =

Type of reflecting prism

Reflections in a Bauernfeind prism for 60 deg beam deviation. Green side requires reflective coating.

A Bauernfeind prism is a type of reflecting prism used to deviate a beam of light by 45° to 60°, depending on its construction, while neither flipping nor rotating the image. It is named for its inventor, the German expert of geodesy Karl Maximilian von Bauernfeind.

The beam is reflected twice in the prism, with one reflection happening at less than the critical angle. Therefore, the prism requires a reflective coating for this surface to be usable in practice.

A Bauernfeind prism with 45° beam deviation is also known as a half-penta prism or semipentaprism. A Bauernfeind prism is used together with a Schmidt roof prism to form a Schmidt–Pechan prism.

== Applications ==
The Bauernfeind prism is commonly used in microscope tubes and in geodesy to deviate the path to the eyepiece in order make the device more ergonomic.

More recent applications are glasses that deflect the viewing angle either downwards (for relaxed reading or watching TV), or upwards (as in belay glasses for watching a climber while belaying).
