= Karl Maximilian von Bauernfeind =

German geodesist and civil engineer

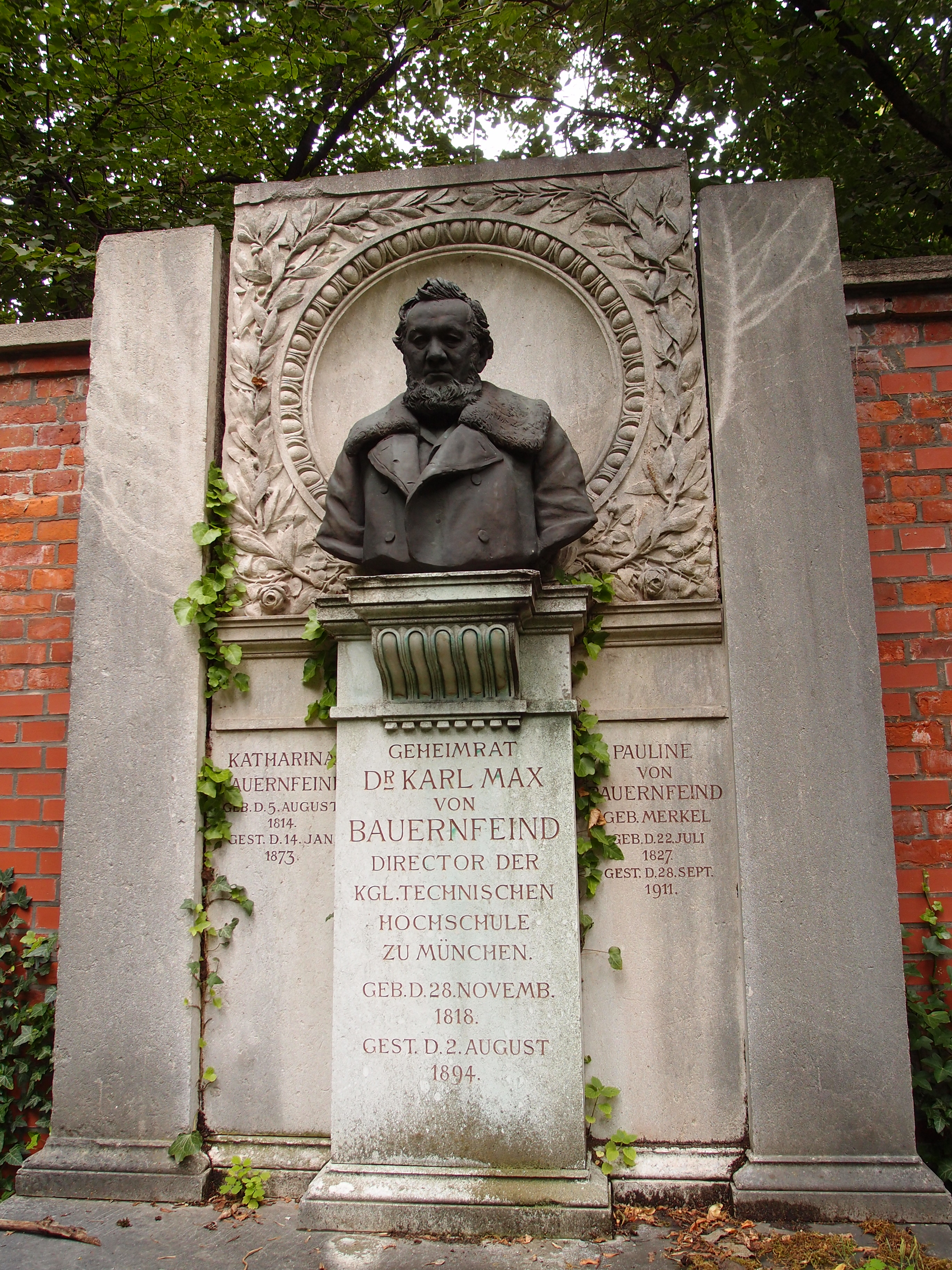
- Grave of Karl Max von Bauernfeind at the Alter Nordfriedhof in Munich

4th Director of the Technical University of Munich
- In office 1880–1889
- Preceded by: August von Kluckhohn
- Succeeded by: Karl Haushofer

1st Director of the Polytechnische Schule München
- In office 1868–1874
- Preceded by: Position established
- Succeeded by: Wilhelm von Beetz

Personal details
- Born: 28 November 1818 Arzberg, Kingdom of Bavaria
- Died: 3 August 1894 (aged 75) Feldafing, German Empire
- Education: Nuremberg Polytechnic School; Ludwig-Maximilians-Universität München

Karl Maximilian von Bauernfeind (28 November 1818 – 3 August 1894) was a German geodesist and civil engineer.

== Education ==
At the age of 18, Bauernfeind studied under Georg Ohm at the Polytechnic School in Nuremberg. Two years later, he studied mathematics and physics at the Ludwig-Maximilians-Universität München and passed the state examination in 1841.

== Career ==
After gaining practical experience as an engineer during the construction of the Ludwig South-North Railway, he became associate professor of geodesy at the Königlich polytechnischen Schule in Munich in 1846 and full professor in 1851.

In 1846, Bauernfeind presented a new revision of the theory of bridge vaults, which remained authoritative for a long time. Five years later, he invented the prismatic cross (including the Bauernfeind prism), a device that soon became a valuable tool for geodesists because of its accuracy.

In 1856, his Elemente der Vermessungskunde (Elements of Surveying) was published, which became the standard work of this young science for decades. In 1857, he undertook barometric height measurements in the Alps; this was the first time that the influence of the thermal radiation of the earth's surface was clearly recognized. In 1864, he made a detailed study of atmospheric refraction.

In 1865, he became an associate member of the Bavarian Academy of Sciences and in 1870 was accepted as a full member. In 1873, he was elected a member of the German National Academy of Sciences Leopoldina.

From 1868, he was the founding director of the Polytechnischen Schule München, which would later become the Technical University of Munich. There, he shaped geodesy into a scientific discipline. After relinquishing the directorship in 1874, he held this post again from 1880 to 1889.
