= Hans Maier (politician) =

German political scientist, academic and politician (1931–2026)

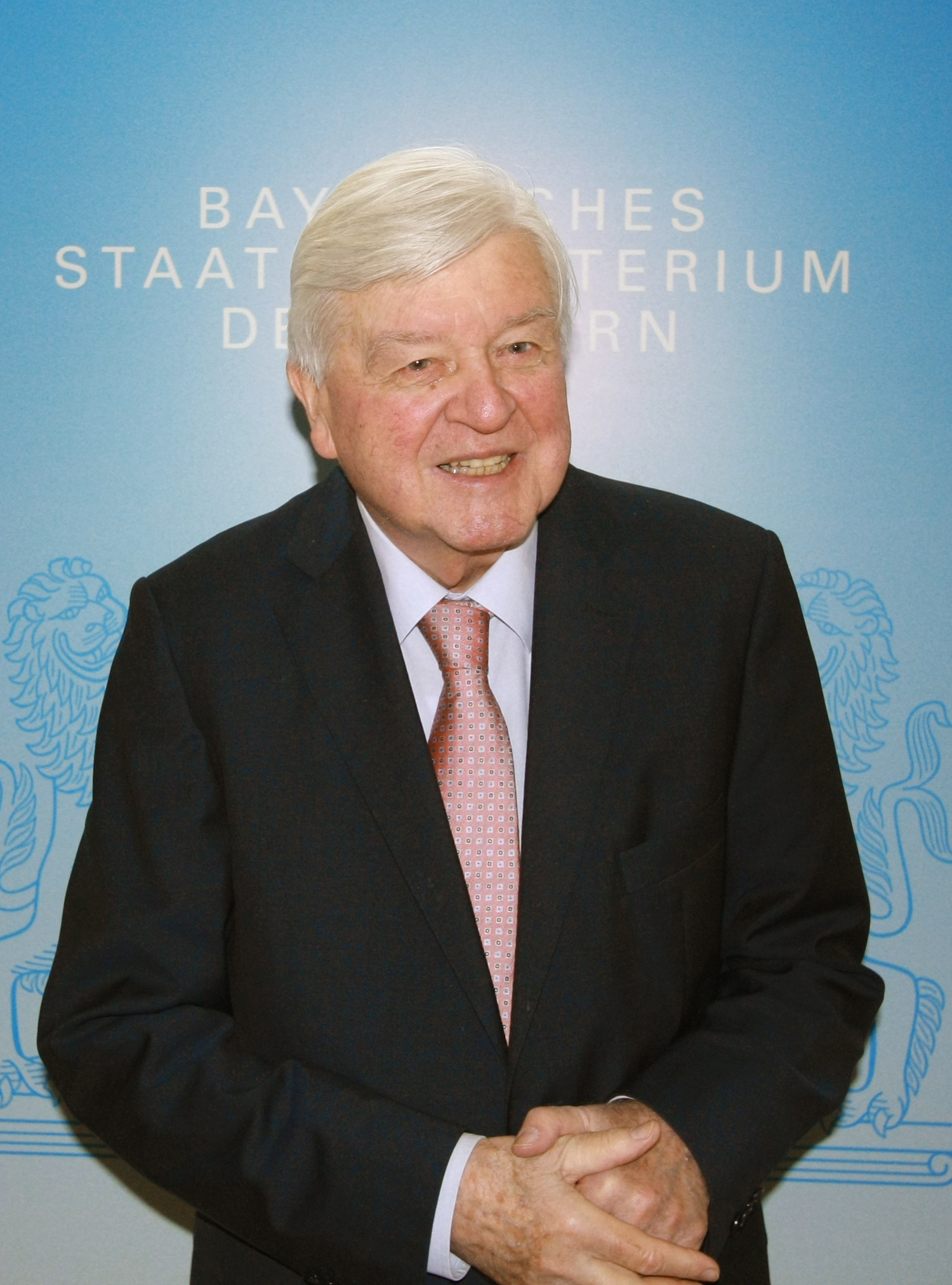
- Maier in 2012

Member of the Landtag of Bavaria
- In office 30 October 1978 – 31 December 1987

Minister of Education and Culture of Bavaria
- In office 8 December 1970 – 30 October 1986
- Preceded by: Ludwig Huber
- Succeeded by: Hans Zehetmair

Personal details
- Born: 18 June 1931 Freiburg im Breisgau, Baden, Germany
- Died: 8 June 2026 (aged 94) Munich, Bavaria, Germany
- Party: CSU
- Education: University of Freiburg; Ludwig-Maximilians-Universität München; University of Paris
- Occupation: Political scientist

Hans Maier (18 June 1931 – 8 June 2026) was a German political scientist, academic and politician. A member of the Christian Social Union in Bavaria, he served in the Landtag of Bavaria from 1978 to 1987 and was Minister of Education and Culture of Bavaria from 1970 to 1986.

Maier died in Munich on 8 June 2026, at the age of 94.
