= Wilhelm von Beetz =

German physicist

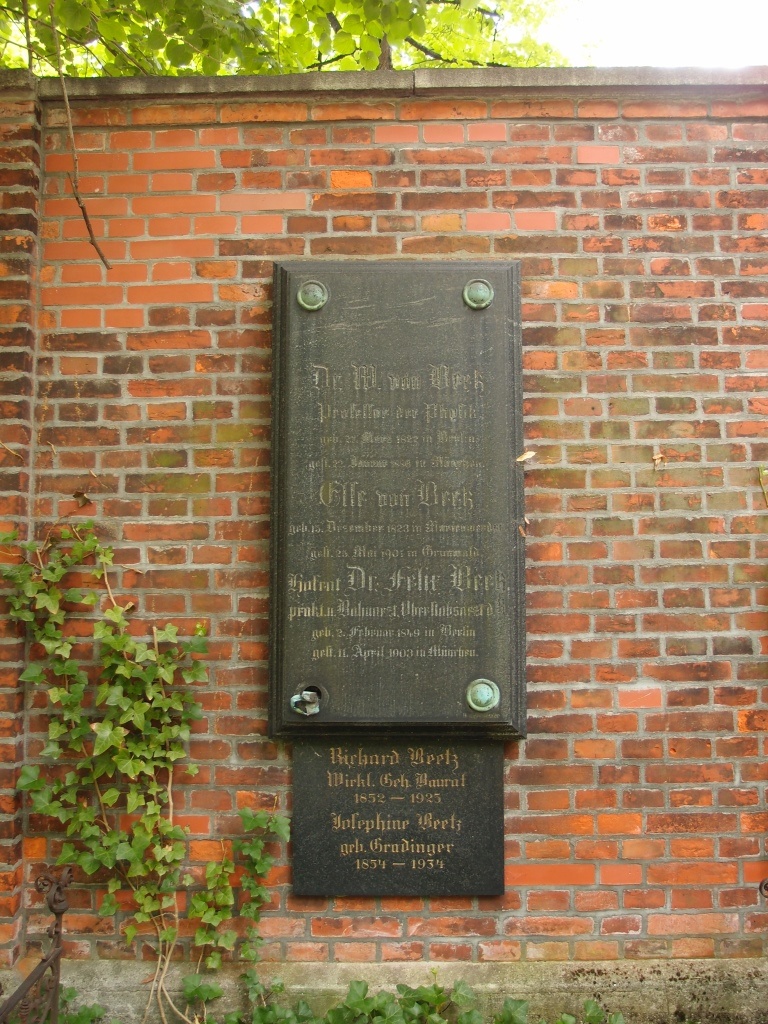
- Grave of Wilhelm von Beetz on the Alter Nordfriedhof in Munich

Director of the Polytechnische Schule München
- In office 1874–1877
- Preceded by: Karl Maximilian von Bauernfeind
- Succeeded by: August von Kluckhohn

Personal details
- Born: 27 March 1822; Berlin, Kingdom of Prussia
- Died: 22 January 1886 (aged 63); Munich, German Empire

Wilhelm von Beetz (27 March 1822 – 22 January 1886) was a German physicist, known for his studies of electrical conductivity properties.

Von Beetz was born in Berlin. He studied physics, chemistry and physiology in the University of Berlin, and after completion of studies, remained in Berlin as an instructor of physics at the Cadet Corps, followed by duties as a teacher at the artillery and engineering school. Afterwards, he was a professor at the universities of Bern (from 1856) and Erlangen (from 1858). In 1868 he became a professor at the Technical University of Munich, where in 1874 to 1877 he was director. In 1845, he was co-founder of Deutsche Physikalische Gesellschaft. In 1869 he became a member of the Bavarian Academy of Sciences, and in 1882 was named president of the Internationalen Elektrizitäts-Ausstellung (International Electricity Exposition) in Munich. He died in Munich.

== Published works ==
He best known work was Leitfaden der Physik (4th edition, 1872), a textbook of physics that was published over numerous editions. Other noted writings by Beetz include:

- Ueber Magnetismus (1852) – On magnetism.
- Ueber den electrochemischen Vorgang an einer Aluminiumanode (1877) – On the electrochemical process of an aluminum anode.
- Grundzüge der Elektrizitätslehre: zehn Vorlesungen (1878) – Principles of electrical theory.
- Ueber galvanische Trockenelemente und deren Anwendung zu elektrometrischen und galvanometrischen Messungen (1885) – On galvanic dry cells and their application to electrometric and galvanometric measurements.
