= Walther von Dyck =

German mathematician (1856–1934)

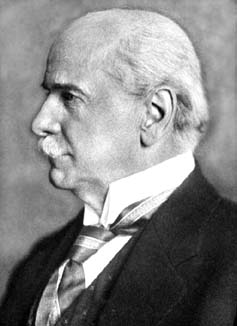

8th Rector of the Technical University of Munich
- In office 1919–1925
- Preceded by: Karl Heinrich Hager
- Succeeded by: Jonathan Zenneck

1st Rector of the Technical University of Munich
- In office 1903–1906
- Preceded by: Position renamed
- Succeeded by: Friedrich von Thiersch

7th Director of the Technical University of Munich
- In office 1900–1903
- Preceded by: Egbert von Hoyer
- Succeeded by: Position renamed

Personal details
- Born: 6 December 1856 Munich, Kingdom of Bavaria
- Died: 5 November 1934 (aged 77) Munich, Nazi Germany
- Education: Technical University of Munich
- Scientific career
- Fields: Mathematics
- Thesis: Über regulär verzweigte Riemannsche Flächen und die durch sie definierten Irrationalitäten (1879)
- Doctoral advisor: Felix Klein

Walther Franz Anton von Dyck (6 December 1856 – 5 November 1934), born Dyck (German pronunciation: [diːk]) and later ennobled, was a German mathematician. He is credited with being the first to define a mathematical group, in the modern sense in (Dyck 1882). He laid the foundations of combinatorial group theory, being the first to systematically study a group by generators and relations.

== Biography ==
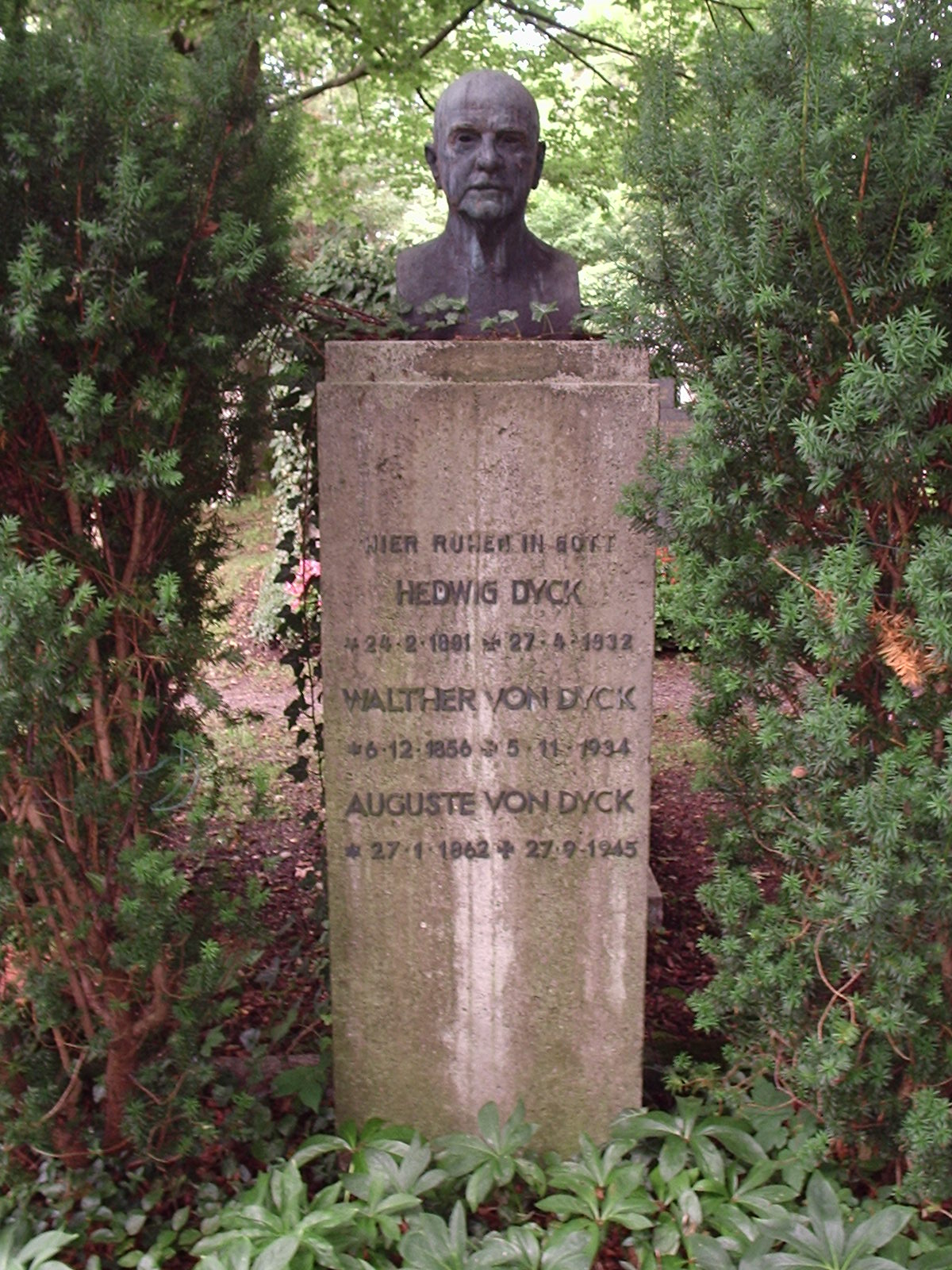
Bust of Walther von Dyck at his grave in Munich

Von Dyck was a student of Felix Klein and served as chairman of the commission publishing Klein's encyclopedia. Von Dyck was also the editor of Kepler's works. He promoted technological education as rector of the Technische Hochschule of Munich. He was a Plenary Speaker of the ICM in 1908 at Rome.

Von Dyck is the son of the Bavarian painter Hermann Dyck.

== Legacy ==
The Dyck language in formal language theory is named after him, as are Dyck's theorem and Dyck's surface in the theory of surfaces, together with the von Dyck groups, the Dyck tessellations, Dyck paths, and the Dyck graph.

== Publications ==
- Dyck, Walther (1882), "Gruppentheoretische Studien (Group-theoretical Studies)", Mathematische Annalen (in German), 20 (1): 1–44, doi:10.1007/BF01443322, hdl:2027/njp.32101075301422, ISSN 0025-5831, S2CID 179178038.
