= Herbert Kupfer =

German civil engineer

3rd President of the Technical University of Munich
- In office 1986–1987
- Preceded by: Wolfgang Wild
- Succeeded by: Otto Meitinger

Personal details
- Born: 26 March 1927 Munich, Weimar Republic
- Died: 30 December 2013 (aged 86)
- Education: Technical University of Munich
- Scientific career
- Thesis: Über die Berechnung von Spannbetonbalken bei Belastung bis zum Bruch unter besonderer Berücksichtigung der Haftspannungen (1955)
- Doctoral advisor: Hubert Rüsch

Herbert Kupfer (26 March 1927 – 30 December 2013) was a German civil engineer. From 1986 to 1987, he was President of the Technical University of Munich.

== Education ==
Kupfer attended the Luitpold-Oberrealschule in Munich from 1937 to 1944, before being drafted into service in World War II. After a period as a prisoner of war, Kupfer returned to study civil engineering at the Technical University of Munich between 1946 and 1949. He received his doctorate in engineering under Hubert Rüsch in 1955.

== Career ==
After his studies, Kupfer worked at the construction company Dyckerhoff & Widmann, where he was responsible for the calculation and design of major projects in structural engineering and bridge construction.

In 1967, he took over the Chair of Timber Structures and Building Construction at the Department of Civil Engineering of the Technical University of Munich, where he was appointed full professor in 1969.

Between 1984 and 1988, he was Vice President of the Technical University of Munich, and in 1986/1987 President.

== Awards ==
- Fellow of the American Concrete Institute (1987)
- Order of Merit of the Federal Republic of Germany (1988)
