= Hans Zehetmair =

German teacher and politician (1936–2022)

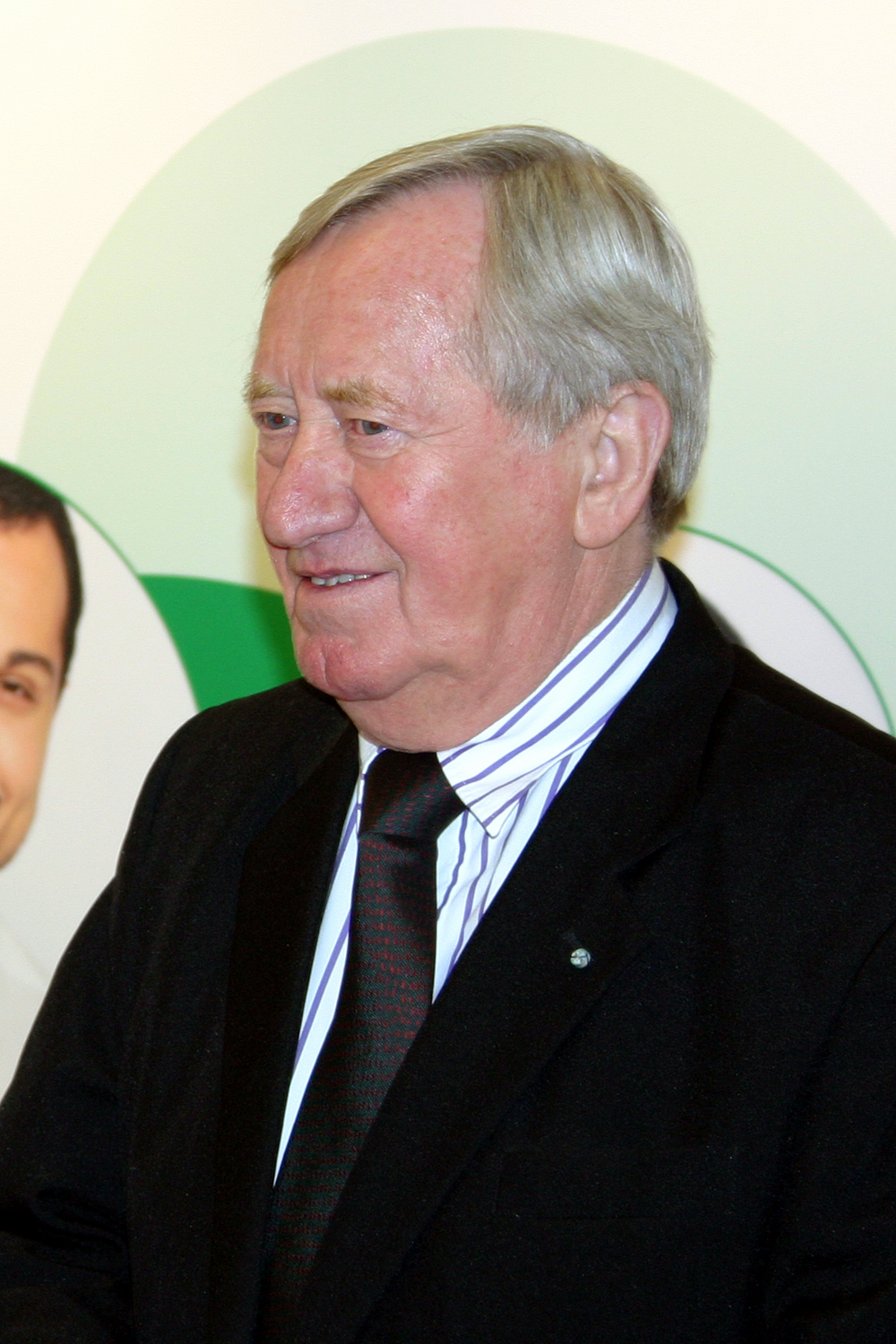
- Zehetmair in 2010

Minister of Science, Research and Art of Bavaria
- In office 1989–1993
- Preceded by: Wolfgang Wild
- Succeeded by: Thomas Goppel

Minister of Culture of Bavaria
- In office 1986–1988
- Preceded by: Hans Maier
- Succeeded by: Monika Hohlmeier

Member of the Landtag of Bavaria
- In office 24 October 1990 – 5 October 2003
- In office 12 November 1974 – 12 July 1978
- Constituency: Erding

Personal details
- Born: Johann Baptist Zehetmair; 23 October 1936 Erding, Gau Munich-Upper Bavaria, Germany
- Died: 27 November 2022 (aged 86)
- Party: CSU
- Education: LMU Munich
- Occupation: Teacher

Johann Baptist Zehetmair (23 October 1936 – 27 November 2022) was a German teacher and politician. A member of the Christian Social Union in Bavaria, he served in the Landtag of Bavaria from 1974 to 1978 and was Minister of Culture of Bavaria from 1986 to 1988 and Minister of Culture of Bavaria from 1989 to 1993.

Zehetmair died on 27 November 2022, at the age of 86.
