= Hermann Dyck =

German painter

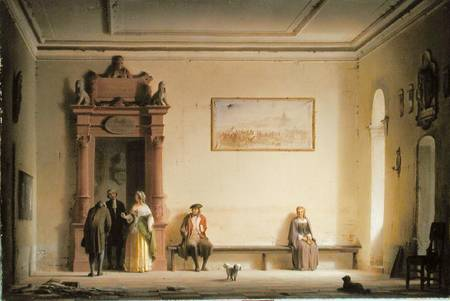
The Waitingroom, 1857

Hermann Dyck (4 October 1812 – 25 March 1874), a Bavarian painter, born at Würzburg in the Grand Duchy of Würzburg in 1812, studied architectural and genre painting at Munich. His works are original and of great humour, and are neatly and carefully executed. The satirical designs for the Fliegende Blätter, in reference to the rage for monuments, are incomparable. He was director of the Art Schools at Munich, where he died in 1874.

== See also ==
- Walther von Dyck
- List of German painters
