= Otto Meitinger =

German architect

4th President of the Technical University of Munich
- In office 1987–1995
- Preceded by: Herbert Kupfer
- Succeeded by: Wolfgang A. Herrmann

Personal details
- Born: May 8, 1927 Munich, Germany
- Died: September 9, 2017 (aged 90)
- Education: Technical University of Munich

Otto Meitinger (8 May 1927 in Munich – 9 September 2017) was a German architect and preservationist. From 1987 to 1995 he was president of the Technical University of Munich.

== Life ==
Meitinger was born as son of the first municipal architect of Munich Karl Meitinger. He studied architecture at the Department of Architecture of the Technical University of Munich, finished his Staatsexamen and got his doctorate on the building history of the Munich Residenz.

From 1953 to 1963 he was Director of the Residenz Building Offices and in charge of the reconstruction of the Munich Residenz, including the Cuvilliés Theatre, court chappel, treasure chamber and Ornate Rooms (Reichen Zimmer). At that time the reconstruction of the Residenz was considered as example for the reconstruction of war-destroyed historical buildings all over Europe. From 1963 to 1976 he was head of the building department of the Max Planck Society and responsible for over 60 new institute buildings, domestic and abroad.

In 1976 he became Professor for Design and Preservation at the Technical University of Munich. In 1987 he was elected President of the University and stayed in office until his retirement in 1995. "He took the chance of generation change and won first class professors to secure the leading position of the TU in teaching and research."

Meitinger was member of a variety of professional societies and committees, i.e., at the German Academy of town planning (Deutschen Akademie für Städtebau), the Bavarian State Architectural Art Committee (Bayerischen Landesbaukunstausschuss), the State Memorial Committee (Landesdenkmalrat), the selection committees of the Bavarian State Foundation and the Hypo-Art-Foundation (Bayerischen Landesstiftung/Hypo-Kulturstiftung) and the board of trustees of the Philip Morris Foundation (Kuratorium der Philip Morris Stiftung).

== Important work ==
- Recreation of the Residenz, Munich
- Palazzo Zuccari, Rome
- Kaulbach-Villa, Munich
- Rebuilding of Hammerschmidt Villa, Bonn
- Rebuilding of Bellevue Palace, Berlin
- Marstallplatz, Munich

== Honours and distinctions ==
- Bavarian Maximilian Order for Science and Art (1991)
- Bavarian Order of Merit
- Commanders Cross of the Order of Merit of the Federal Republic of Germany (Großes Bundesverdienstkreuz)
- Medal Bene Merenti in Silver of the Bavarian Academy of Sciences and Humanities (1959)
- Commanders Cross of the Etoile noir of the French Legion of Honour
- Knight of the Order of St. Sylvester,
- Golden Honorary Coin of the City of Munich (1995) (Goldene Ehrenmünze der Stadt München).
- Honorary citizen of the city of Munich (2005)
- Founding Member of the European Academy of Sciences and Arts (1990)

== Literature ==
- Lehrstuhl für Entwerfen und Denkmalpflege Technische Universität München: Otto Meitinger : Architekt - Denkmalpfleger - Hochschullehrer, Munich 1997
