= Philip Skell =

American chemist and professor

Philip S. Skell (December 30, 1918 – November 21, 2010) was an American chemist. He was the Evan Pugh Professor at Pennsylvania State University. In 1977, he was elected a member of the National Academy of Sciences.

== Biography ==
Skell was born in Brooklyn, New York, to Jacob and Molly Lipfriend Skell. He married Margo Fosse on December 25, 1948, in Taft.

He held a Bachelor of Science degree from City College of New York, a master's degree from Columbia University and a doctorate from Duke University. Skell took part in the early work on the production of Penicillin.

== Research ==
At Penn State, Skell's field of research were then hypothetical very short-lived Reaction intermediates like free radicals, Carbonium ions, Tricarbon and Carbene, whose existence and properties he could demonstrate by use of Chemical traps. Applying new experimental techniques he was able to examine the chemical properties of single free atoms rather than atoms in compound. His contributions have been characterized as follows:

Another class of intermediates, containing divalent carbon atoms, were suggested by John Nef early in this century but his ideas were generally rejected. However, the concept was revived with vigor when Philip Skell showed that: CCl_{2}, dichlorocarbone, was formed as a reaction intermediate. Carbene chemistry almost immediately became the subject of extensive physical organic research.

Philip S. Skell, sometimes called "the father of carbene chemistry," is widely known for the "Skell Rule," which was first applied to carbenes, the "fleeting species" of carbon. The rule, which predicts the most probable pathway through which certain chemical compounds will be formed, found use throughout the pharmaceutical and chemical industries.

Philip S. Skell created an internationally renowned school of leading chemists, one of them being his postdoctoral associate Wolfgang A. Herrmann (1975/76), President of the Technical University of Munich from 1995 to 2019.

== Other activities ==
Philip S. Skell was a signatory of A Scientific Dissent From Darwinism.

== Publications ==
- Philip S. Skell, Robert C. Woodworth (1956). "Structure of Carbene CH_{2}'". Journal of the American Chemical Society. 78 (17): 4496–4497. Bibcode:1956JAChS..78.4496S. doi:10.1021/ja01598a087.
