= Alter Nordfriedhof (Munich) =

Cemetery in Munich, Germany

Coordinates: 48.153656°N 11.570219°E

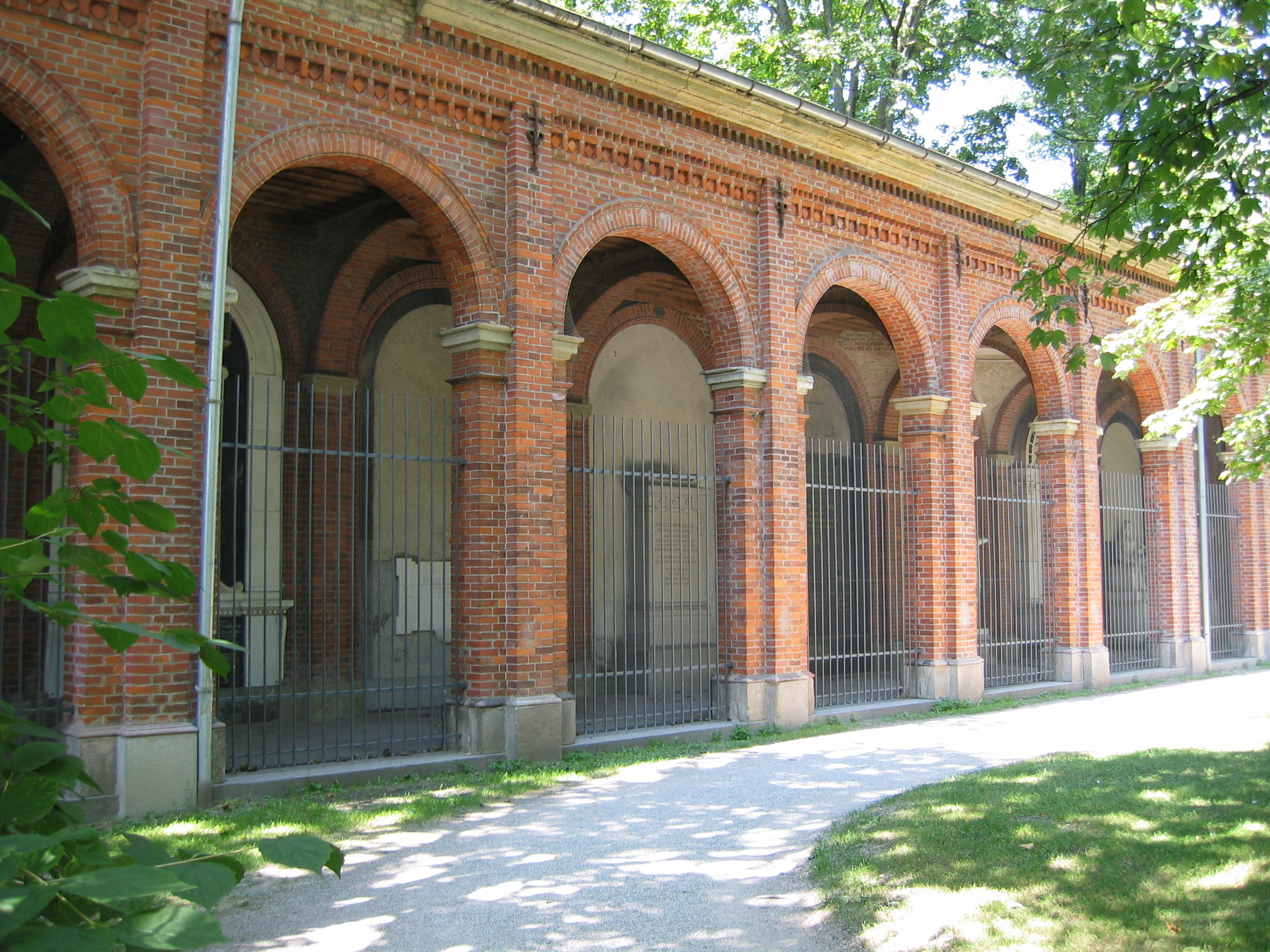
- Arcade vaults
- Interactive map of Alter Nordfriedhof

Details
- Established: 1866
- Location: Munich
- Country: Germany
- Type: Public (closed)

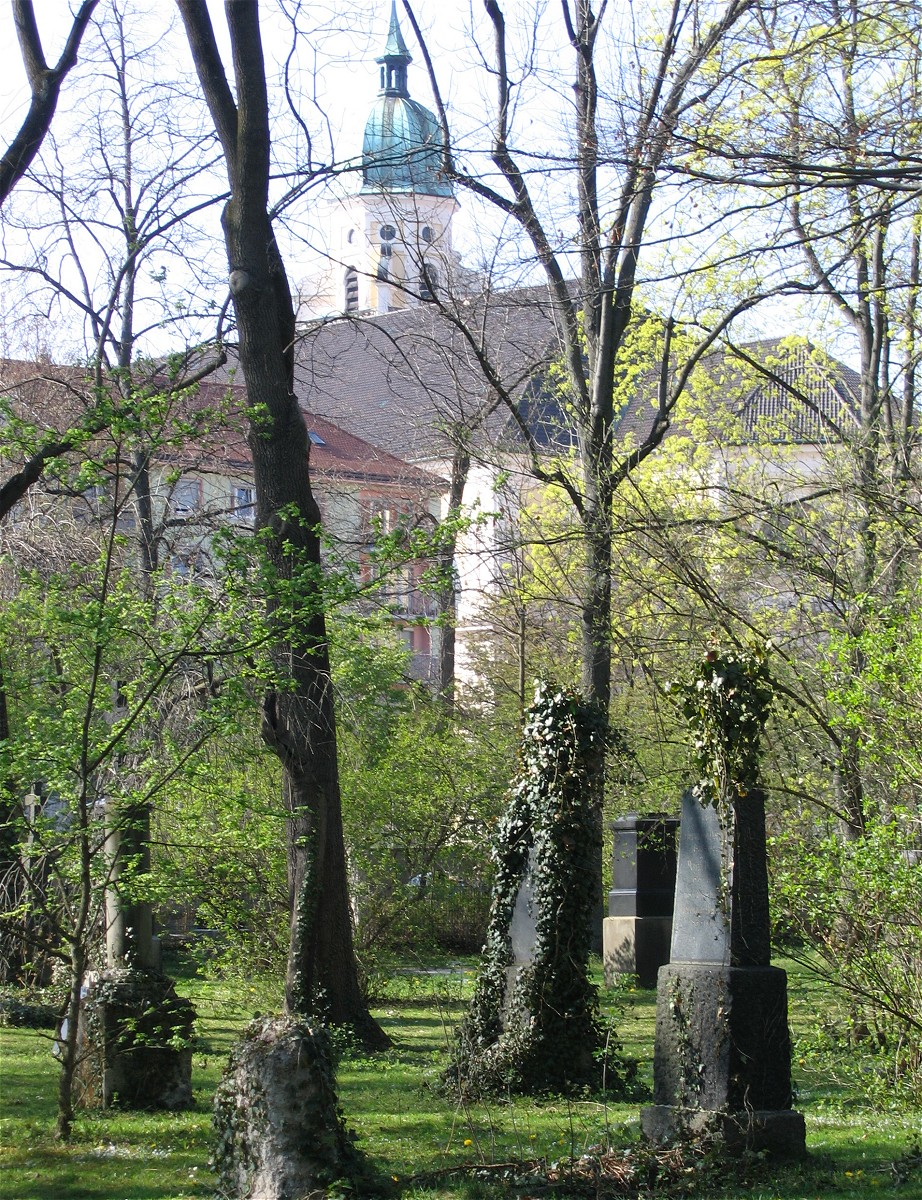
In the background, St. Joseph's Church

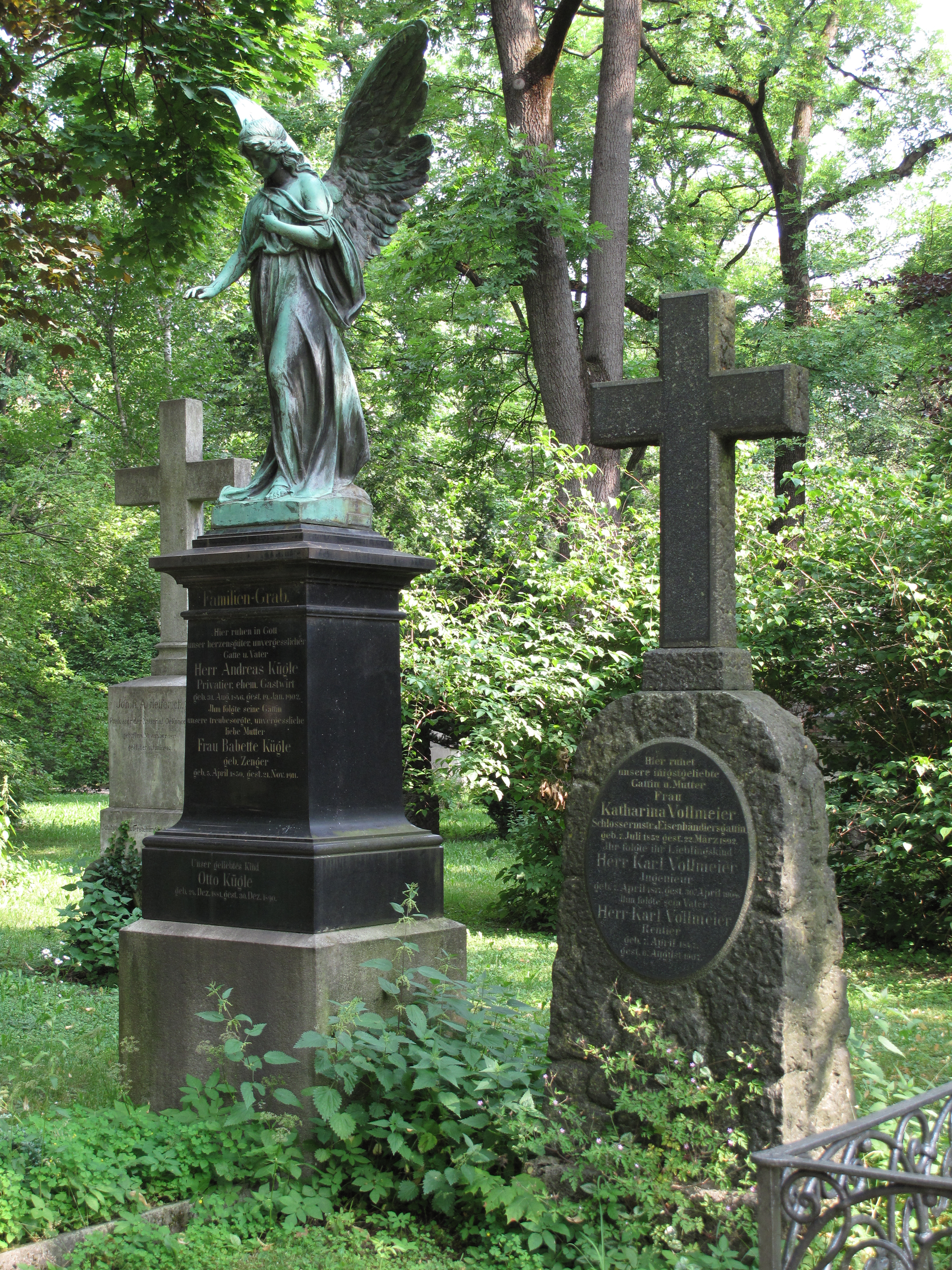
Gravestones

The Alter Nordfriedhof ("Old North Cemetery") is a former cemetery located in the Arcisstrasse in Maxvorstadt, Munich, Bavaria, Germany. It is not to be confused with the Nordfriedhof in Munich, which was set up only a short time later in Schwabing. Construction began in 1866 to designs by the city architect Arnold Zenetti.

== History ==
Until the middle of the 19th century the city of Munich had only a single public burial ground, the present Alter Südfriedhof. This was growing too small however for the rapidly growing city, and planning therefore began for a new burial ground in the north of the city.

Between June 1866 and the summer of 1869 the Northern Cemetery ("Nördlicher Friedhof") was built in Maxvorstadt.

The planning process itself reflected the split in society regarding cemeteries and public buildings generally: on the one hand there was a general wish to have the most prominent grave site possible, but on the other hand an equally general feeling that the cemetery should not be at one's own front door. Despite all controversies the Alter Nördlicher Friedhof opened on 5 October 1868, and the first burial took place the same day, when the remains of the former minister of St. Ludwig's, Munich, were transferred to the new burial ground.

The cemetery itself, rectangular in shape, with the chapel and various service buildings annexed, was originally divided into 16 fields of equal size. Along the west wall 30 arcaded vaults were built; a large cross stands in the middle. In its geometrical ground-plan and to some extent the arcades along the wall it resembled the idea of the Campo Santo, at the time a popular style of burial ground in Germany.

With the rise to power of the National Socialists in 1933 the entire existence of the cemetery was thrown into doubt: the new regime, in the context of the re-building of Munich as the capital of the movement, wanted to connect Isabellastraße with Luisenstraße in order to construct a spectacular boulevard, which was obstructed by the Alter Nördlicher Friedhof. For this reason burials ceased in 1939. Up to 1944 there were still single burials in existing family graves. After that time the cemetery was badly affected by air raids and was closed altogether. Many of the arcade vaults and most of the other cemetery buildings were destroyed.

After the war it was decided not to reopen the cemetery. For one thing, most of the graves were full. For another, there was enough capacity in the large cemeteries opened at the beginning of the 20th century under Hans Grässel to be able to do without this rather small one. Many graves were subsequently cleared: of the total capacity of 7,272 burial places only about 700 were kept. From 1868 to 1944/45 about 62,000 people were buried there. Half the arcades were not rebuilt after the war. On the site of the chapel a playground now stands, separated from the rest of the cemetery. The present appearance is due to the architect Hans Döllgast.

== Present day ==
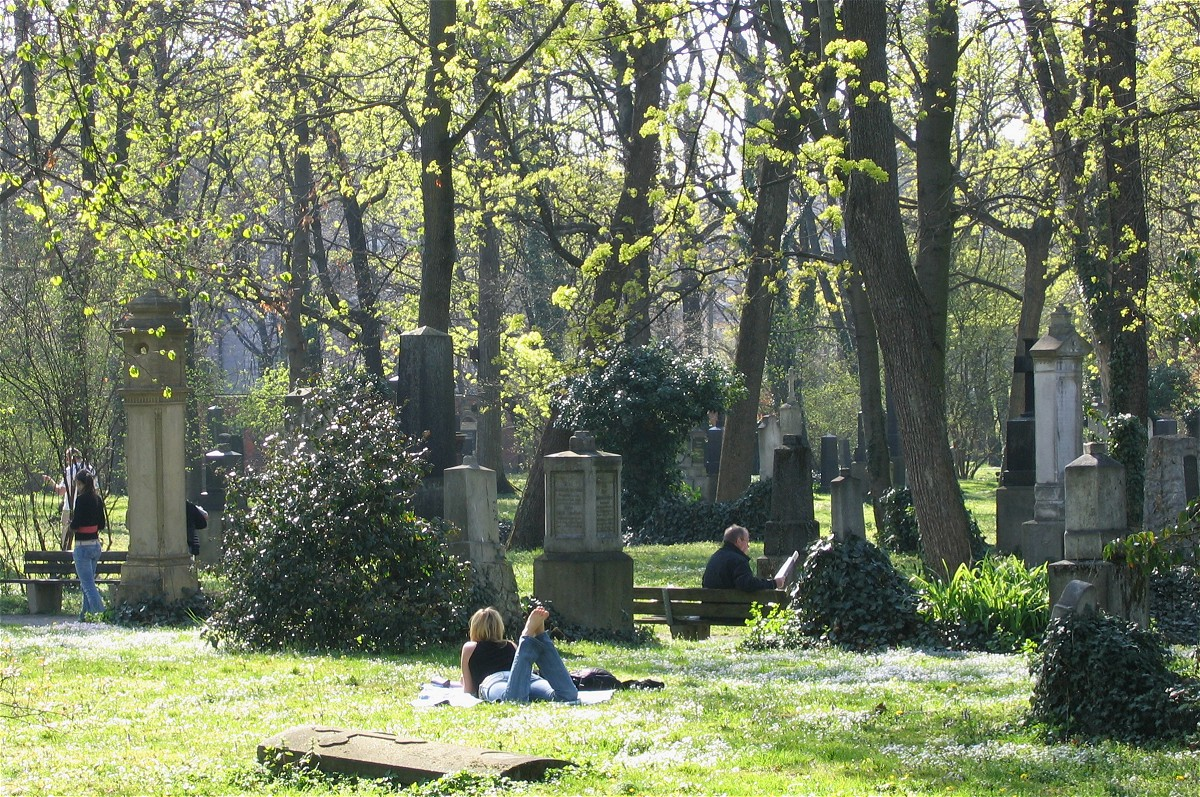
Recreational use

The Alter Nördlicher Friedhof, with its light planting of trees, today represents a significant green space in the Maxvorstadt district and is used as a small park, with due respect for those long since buried here. Many benches have been installed. On fine days the grass between the ivy-covered gravestones is popular for sun-bathing. The path round the inside of the wall and the arcades is much used by joggers: a single circuit round the four hectare space is about 750 metres.

The playground that adjoins to the west is used among other things for ball games, and also for ground chess.

== Notable burials ==
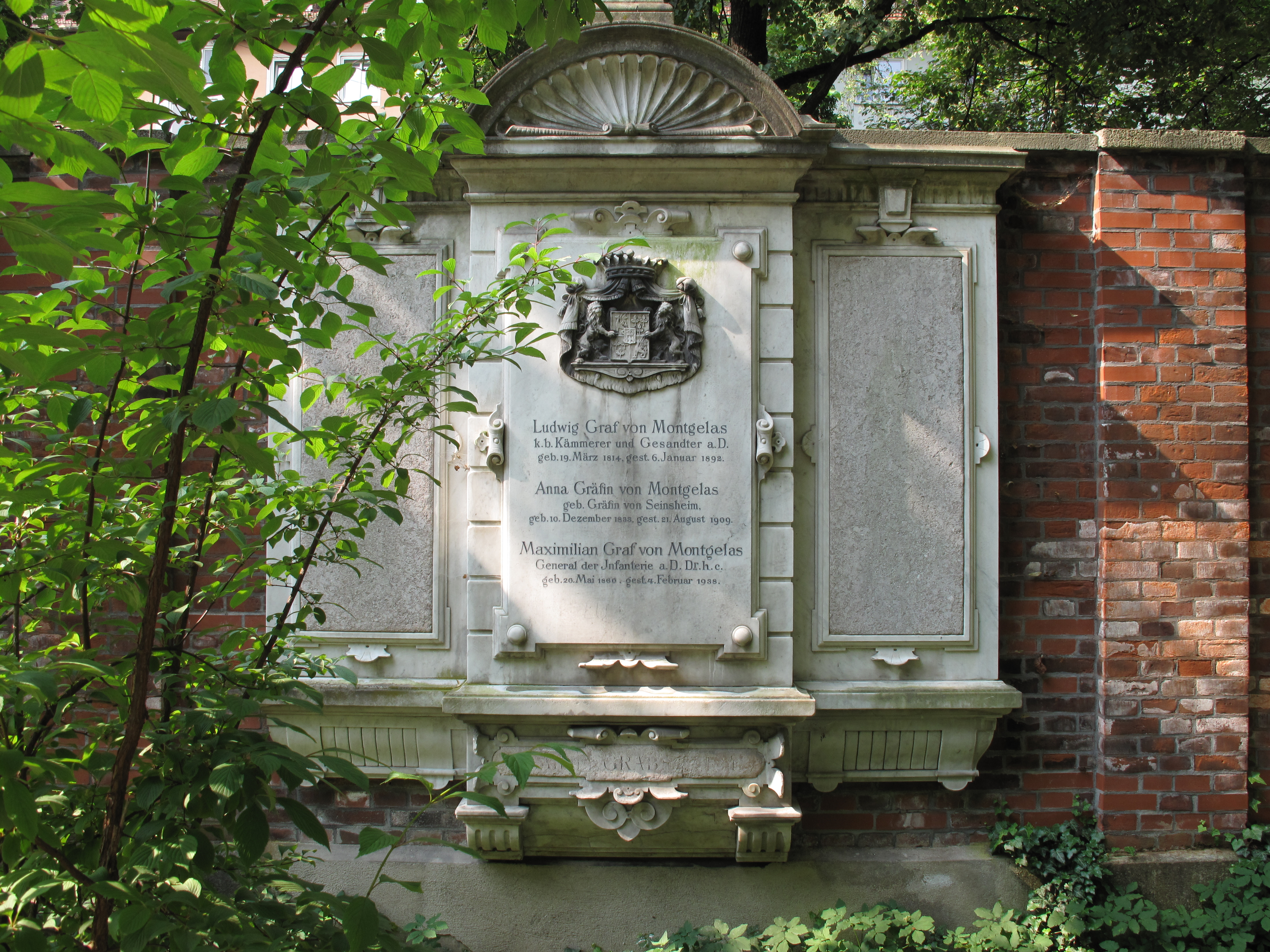
Grave of Max von Montgelas

- Wilhelm Bauer (1822–1875), engineer
- Karl Maximilian von Bauernfeind (1818–1894), engineer and geologist
- Wilhelm Dürr the Elder (1815–1890), court painter of Baden
- Carl Wilhelm von Gümbel (1823–1898), geologist and Citizen of Honour (Ehrenbürger) of Munich
- Carl August Lebschée (1800–1877), painter and drawer of the Munich cityscape
- Hermann Lingg (1820–1905), writer, founder of the Die Krokodile
- Joseph Molitor von Mühlfeld (1855–1890), artist
- Max von Montgelas (1860–1938), politician, diplomat (military attaché) and historian
- Sigmund Riefler (1847–1912), builder of scientific chronometers
- Wilhelm Heinrich Riehl (1823–1897), journalist, novelist and cultural historian
- Emil Rohde (1839–1913), actor at the Bavarian Hoftheater
- Benignus von Safferling (1825–1895), general and Bavarian Minister of War
- Ludwig von der Tann-Rathsamhausen (1815–1881), infantry general and commanding general of the I Königlich Bayerisches Armee-Korps
- Carl von Thieme (1844–1924), founder of the Münchener Rückversicherung und Allianzversicherung insurance company
- Moritz Wagner (1813–1887), traveller, ethnologist, geographer, naturalist and first curator of the Royal ethnological collections (the later Völkerkundemuseum)

== Literature ==
- Isolde Ohlbaum, Axel Winterstein: Der Alte Nördliche Friedhof. MünchenVerlag, 2012, ISBN 978-3-937090-59-7.
- Davide von Retberg: Friedhof-Notizen. In: Monatsblatt des Heraldisch-Genealogischen Vereines „Adler“. Band 3, 1895, pp. 413–419
- Günther Baumann: Der alte Nördliche Friedhof an der Arcisstraße. In: Neuhauser Werkstatt-Nachrichten. Heft 7. München 2001, pp. 53–56
- Elfi Zuber: Der Alte Nördliche Friedhof: ein Kapitel Münchner Kulturgeschichte. 2nd revised edition. Zeke, München 1984, ISBN 3-924078-01-7.
- Hans-Peter Burchardt (ed.), Marianne Lengfelder: Im Alten Nördlichen Friedhof München. Schneekluth, München 1985, ISBN 3-7951-0961-2.
- Erich Scheibmayr: Letzte Heimat. Self-published, München 1985
- Erich Scheibmayr: Wer? Wann? Wo? 3 parts (1989, 1997, 2002). Self-published, München
