= Wolfgang A. Herrmann =

German chemist and academic administrator

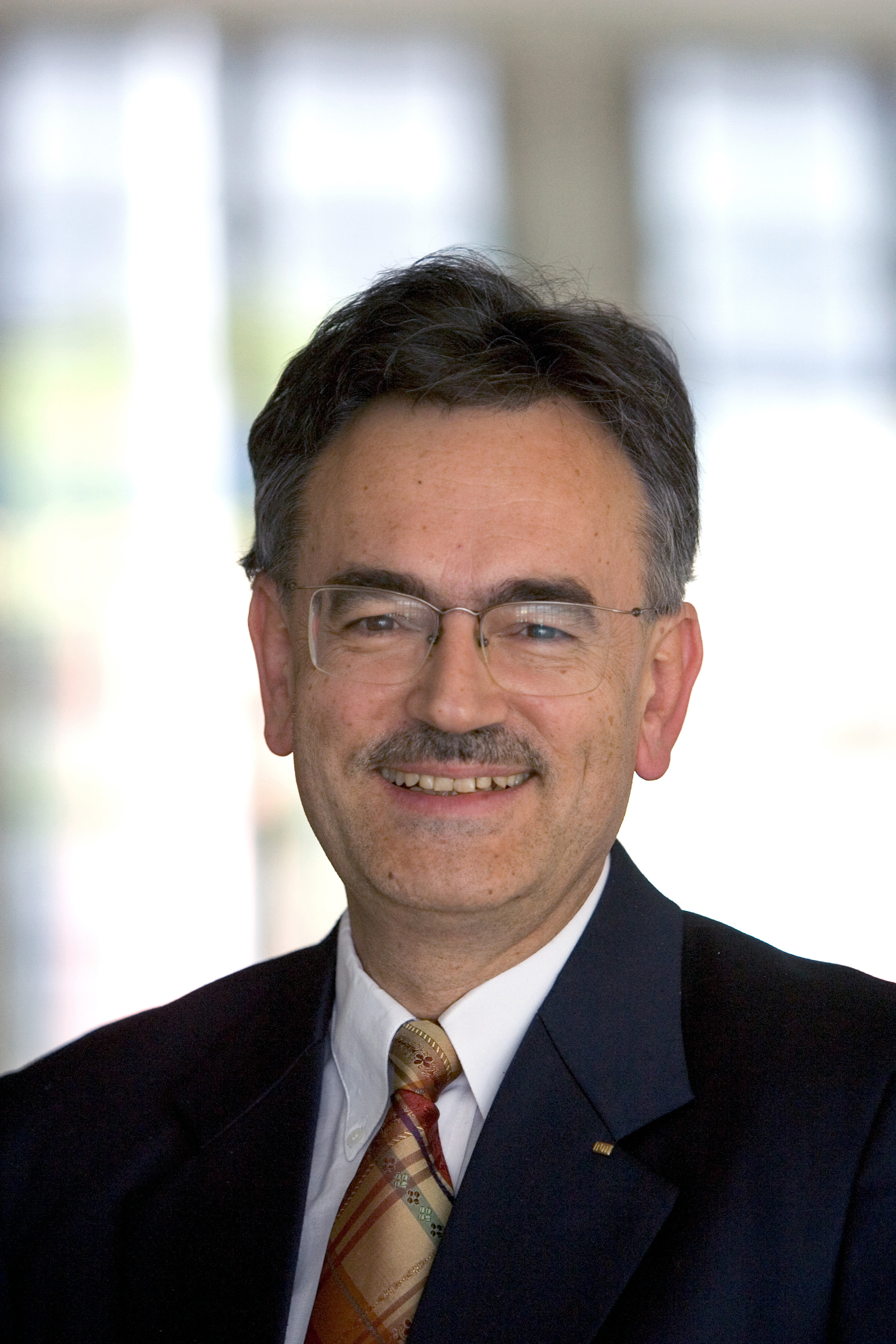
- Herrmann in 2007

President of the Technical University of Munich
- In office 1995–2019
- Preceded by: Otto Meitinger
- Succeeded by: Thomas Hofmann

Personal details
- Born: 18 April 1948 (age 77); Kelheim, Germany
- Education: Technical University of Munich; University of Regensburg
- Known for: Inorganic and organometallic chemistry
- Scientific career
- Thesis: Optically Active Transition Metal Complexes with Square‐Pyramidal Geometry (1973)
- Doctoral advisor: Henri Brunner

Wolfgang Anton Herrmann (born 18 April 1948) is a German chemist and academic administrator. From 1995 to 2019, he was President of the Technical University of Munich.

== Education ==
Herrmann attended the Donau-Gymnasium Kelheim, where he passed the Abitur in 1967. He then studied chemistry at the Technical University of Munich on a scholarship from Cusanuswerk, where he wrote his diploma thesis in 1971 under the supervision of Ernst Otto Fischer, a later Nobel Prize laureate. He received his doctorate in 1973 at the University of Regensburg. After a research fellowship of the Deutsche Forschungsgemeinschaft with Philip Skell at the Pennsylvania State University from 1975 to 1976, he habilitated at the University of Regensburg in 1978.

== Career ==
Herrmann was appointed professor at the University of Regensburg in 1979. In 1982, he transferred to the Goethe University Frankfurt. In 1985, he succeeded Ernst Otto Fischer at the Department of Chemistry of the Technical University of Munich. From 1988 to 1990, he was dean of the department.

In 1995, Herrmann was elected President of the Technical University of Munich. He was reelected in 1999, 2005, 2007 and 2013.

== Research ==
With an h-index of 106 (According to Scopus; As of 2021), Herrmann is one of the most highly cited German chemists, with more than 800 scientific publications and around 80 patents.

== Awards ==
- Honorary President of New Uzbekistan University (2021)
- Commander of the French Legion of Honour (2019)
- Bavarian Maximilian Order for Science and Art (2012)
- Bavarian Order of Merit (2007)
- Wilhelm Klemm Prize of the German Chemical Society (1995)
- Member of the German Academy of Sciences Leopoldina (1995)
- Max Planck Research Award of the Humboldt Foundation (1991)
- Gottfried Wilhelm Leibniz Prize of the German Research Foundation (1987)
- Klung Wilhelmy Science Award (1982)
