= Thomas Hofmann =

German food chemist and academic administrator

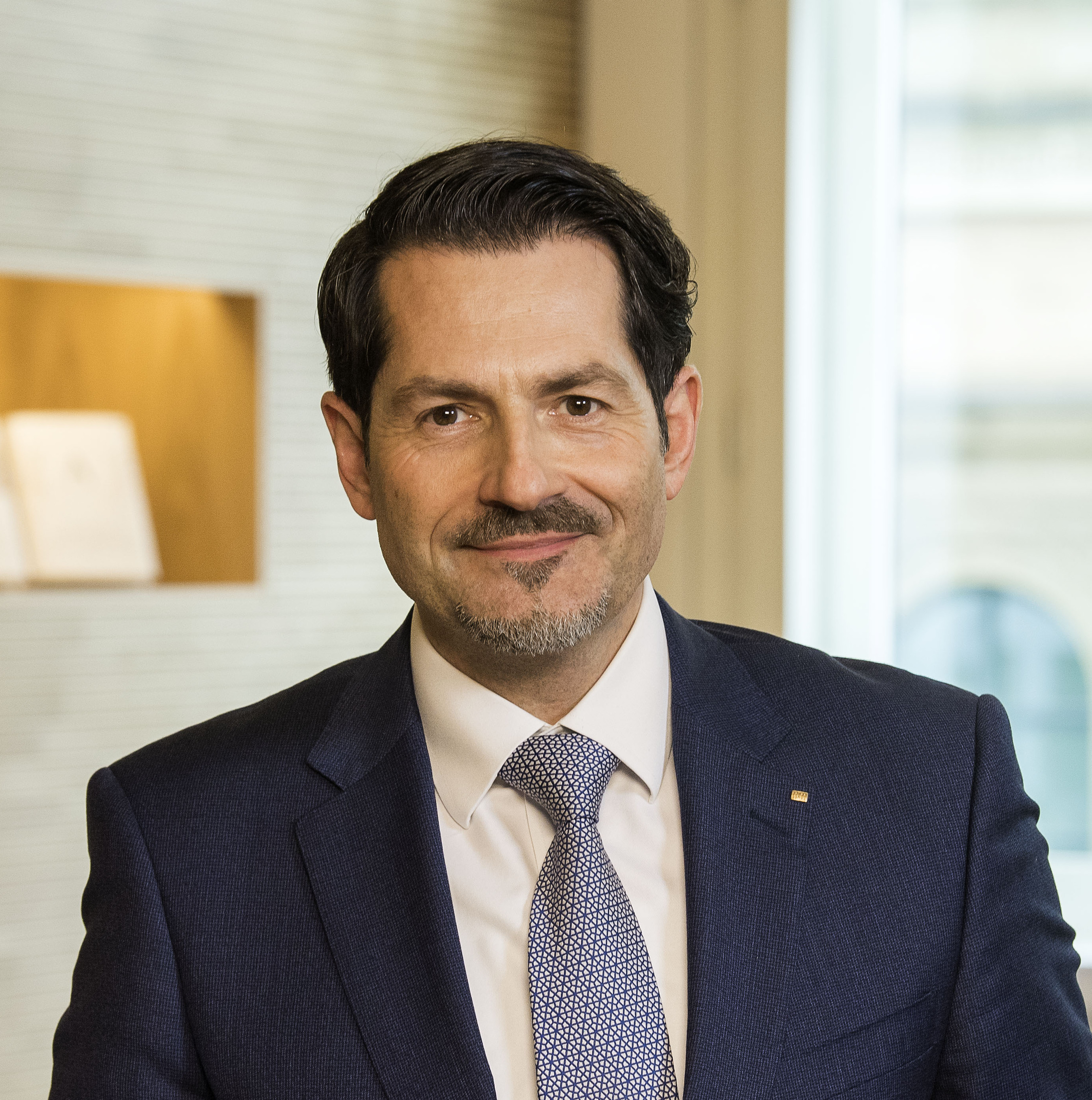

President of the Technical University of Munich
- Incumbent
- Assumed office 1 October 2019
- Preceded by: Wolfgang A. Herrmann

Personal details
- Born: 1968 (age 57–58) Coburg, West Germany
- Education: University of Erlangen–Nuremberg; Technical University of Munich
- Scientific career
- Thesis: Charakterisierung intensiver Geruchsstoffe in Kohlenhydrat/Cystein-Modellreaktionen und Klärung von Bildungswegen: ein Beitrag zur Maillard-Reaktion (1995)

Thomas Frank Hofmann (born 1968) is a German food chemist and academic administrator. Since 2019, he has been President of the Technical University of Munich.

== Education ==
Hofmann passed the Abitur in 1987 at the Meranier-Gymnasium Lichtenfels and studied food chemistry at the University of Erlangen–Nuremberg from 1988 to 1992. In 1995, he received his PhD from the Technical University of Munich and habilitated in 1998.

== Career ==
Until 2002, Hofmann taught as a Privatdozent for Food Chemistry at the Technical University of Munich. From 2002 to 2006, he was Professor (C4) and managing director of the Institute of Food Chemistry at the University of Münster. From 2007, he held the Chair of Food Chemistry and Molecular Sensory Science at the Weihenstephan Science Center of the Technical University of Munich.

From 2009 to 2019, Hofmann was TUM's Executive Vice President for Research and Innovation. In October 2018, he was elected by the University Council to succeed Wolfgang A. Herrmann as President of TUM, effective 1 October 2019. On May 6, 2025, he was re-elected to serve another six years in office.

== Other activities ==
- Max Planck Institute for Biological Intelligence, Member of the Board of Trustees
- Max Planck Institute of Psychiatry, Member of the Board of Trustees
