= Heinz Schmidtke =

German ergonomist

Rector of the Technical University of Munich
- In office 1970–1972
- Preceded by: Horst von Engerth
- Succeeded by: Ulrich Grigull

Personal details
- Born: 6 August 1925 Goslar, Weimar Republic
- Died: 11 December 2013 (aged 88)
- Education: Technical University of Braunschweig

Heinz Schmidtke (6 August 1925 – 11 December 2013) was a German ergonomist. Between 1970 and 1972, he was rector of the Technical University of Munich.

== Life ==
Schmidtke studied psychology and physics at the Technical University of Braunschweig until 1949. He completed his habilitation in 1960.

After working for a year as head of a physical laboratory in the chemical industry, he was granted a visiting professorship at the University of California, Berkeley. In 1957, he became head of the "Psychological Working Group" at the then Max Planck Institute for Occupational Physiology in Dortmund.

In 1962, he was appointed to the newly founded Institute for Occupational Psychology and Occupational Pedagogy at the Technical University of Munich, which later became the Chair of Ergonomics.
