= Wolfgang Wild (physicist) =

German physicist and politician (1930–2023)

1st Bavarian Minister of Science
- In office 1986–1989
- Preceded by: Office established
- Succeeded by: Hans Zehetmair

2nd President of the Technical University of Munich
- In office 1980–1986
- Preceded by: Ulrich Grigull
- Succeeded by: Herbert Kupfer

Personal details
- Born: 20 September 1930 Bayreuth, Bavaria, Germany
- Died: 7 April 2023 (aged 92) Zorneding, Bavaria, Germany
- Education: Ludwig-Maximilians-Universität München
- Scientific career
- Thesis: Tröpfchenmodell des Atomkerns und Zweikörperkräfte (1955)

Wolfgang Wild (20 September 1930 – 7 April 2023) was a German nuclear physicist, academic administrator and politician. He was President of the Technical University of Munich between 1980 and 1986 and Bavarian Minister of Science between 1986 and 1989.

== Early life and career ==
Wild was born on 20 September 1930. He studied physics at the Ludwig-Maximilians-Universität München. After receiving his doctorate in 1955, he first worked as an assistant to Heinz Maier-Leibnitz at the Technical University of Munich. In 1957, he moved to Heidelberg University, where he investigated atomic nuclei with J. Hans D. Jensen, who later won the Nobel Prize.

His habilitation in 1960 was followed the following year by an associate professorship at the Free University of Berlin. In November of the same year, he took over the Chair of Theoretical Physics at the Department of Physics of the Technical University of Munich.

== Political career ==
After the 1986 Bavarian state election, Franz Josef Strauss appointed Wild the first Bavarian Minister of Science.

== Death ==
Wild died on 7 April 2023, at the age of 92.

== Awards ==
- Bavarian Order of Merit
- Order of Merit of the Federal Republic of Germany, 1st class
