= Ulrich Grigull =

German engineer (1912–2003)

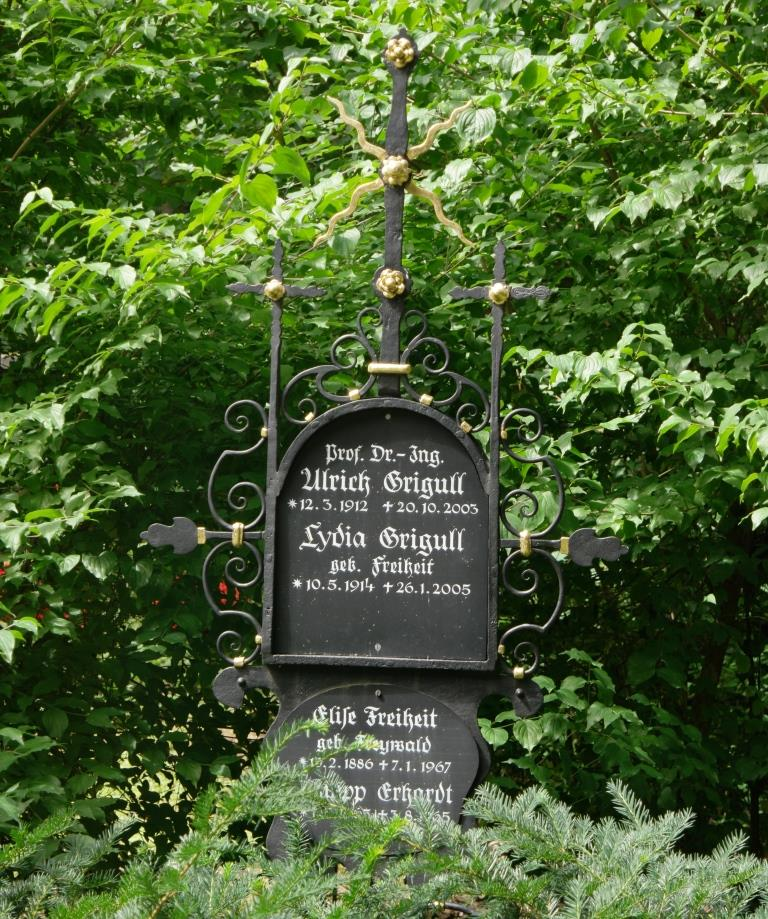
- Resting place of Ulrich Grigull on the Waldfriedhof Solln in Munich

President of the Technical University of Munich
- In office 1976–1980
- Preceded by: Position renamed
- Succeeded by: Wolfgang Wild

Rector of the Technical University of Munich
- In office 1972–1976
- Preceded by: Heinz Schmidtke
- Succeeded by: Position renamed

Personal details
- Born: 12 March 1912 Gallingen, East Prussia, German Empire
- Died: 20 October 2003 (aged 91) Munich, Germany
- Resting place: Waldfriedhof Solln
- Education: Technische Hochschule Danzig; Technical University of Braunschweig

Ulrich Grigull (12 March 1912 – 20 October 2003) was a German engineer. Between 1972 and 1980, he was rector and later president of the Technical University of Munich.

== Early life ==
After graduating from the Stadtgymnasium in Königsberg, Grigull studied mechanical engineering at the Technische Hochschule Danzig from 1930. In 1937, he received his doctorate from the Technical University of Braunschweig.

== Career ==
From 1937 to 1942, Grigull worked at the Luftfahrtforschungsanstalt in Braunschweig. In 1942, he was drafted into the Kriegsmarine and served on U-boats and destroyers.

After the war, Grigull first worked as an engineer and consultant for various companies in the chemical and textile industries. From 1953 to 1960, he worked at Bayer, while also lecturing at the Technical University of Braunschweig.

In 1961, Grigull was appointed to succeed Ernst Schmidt at the Institute of Thermodynamics at the Technical University of Munich. From 1972 to 1976, he was rector of the university and then its president until 1980.

He was co-founder and, until his death, co-editor of the International Journal of Heat and Mass Transfer and co-founder of the journal Heat and Mass Transfer.

== Awards ==
- Max Jakob Memorial Award (1973)
- Carl Friedrich Gauß Medal (1978)
- Arnold Eucken Medal (1979)
- Bavarian Order of Merit (1977)
- Bavarian Maximilian Order for Science and Art (1984)
